= List of ship launches in 2005 =

The list of ship launches in 2005 includes a chronological list of ships launched in 2005.

Date	Ship	Class / type	Builder	Location	Country	Notes
3 January	Flottbek	Eilbek-class container ship	Meyer Werft	Papenburg	Germany	For Hansa Hamburg Shipping
7 January	Hammerodde	RoPax-ferry	B.V. Schps & Mfbk De Merwede v/h van Vliet & Co	Hardinxveld	Netherlands	For Bornholmstrafikken
8 January	Monte Rosa	Monte-class container ship	Daewoo Shipbuilding & Marine Engineering	Okpo	South Korea	For Hamburg Süd
14 January	Colombo Express	Colombo-Express-class container ship	Hyundai Heavy Industries	Ulsan	South Korea	For Hapag Lloyd
22 January	Kidd	Arleigh Burke-class destroyer	Ingalls Shipbuilding	Pascagoula, Mississippi	United States	
28 January	Steadfast	Formidable-class frigate	ST Engineering	Benoi	Singapore	
9 February	Bute	Ferry	Remontowa Group	Gdańsk	Poland	For Caledonian MacBrayne
11 February	CSAV Tianjin	VW 2500-type container ship	Volkswerft Stralsund	Stralsund	Germany	
18 February	FESCO Sakhalin	Platform supply vessel	Aker Finnyards	Helsinki	Finland	For Far East Shipping Company
10 March	Forbin	Horizon-class frigate	DCN	Lorient	France	
27 March	Elite	Sietas type 178 container ship	Daewoo Mangalia	Mangalia	Romania	For JR Ship Management
30 March	Gudrun Mærsk	Mærsk D-class container ship	Odense Staalskibsvaerft	Lindø	Denmark	For Maersk Line
31 March	Elan	Sietas type 178 container ship	Schiffswerft J.J. Sietas	Hamburg-Neuenfelde	Germany	For JR Ship Management
2 April	Mackinaw	Great Lakes icebreaker	Marinette Marine	Marinette, Wisconsin	United States	
2 April	Monte Sartimiento	Monte-class container ship	Daewoo Shipbuilding & Marine Engineering	Okpo	South Korea	For Hamburg Süd
9 April	Texas	Virginia-class submarine	Newport News Shipbuilding	Newport News, Virginia	United States	
9 April	Cardigan Bay	Bay-class landing ship dock	BAE Systems	Glasgow, Scotland	United Kingdom	
18 April	Esbern Snare	Absalon-class support ship	Odense Steel Shipyard	Odense	Denmark	
29 April	Aquila	Sietas type 178 container ship	Schiffswerft J.J. Sietas	Hamburg-Neuenfelde	Germany	For Peter Döhle Schiffahrts KG
4 May	SAS Charlotte Maxeke	Type 209 submarine	ThyssenKrupp Marine Systems	Emden	Germany	For South African Navy
9 May	Barmbek	Eilbek-class container ship	Meyer Werft	Papenburg	Germany	For Hansa Hamburg Shipping
21 May	Lewis and Clark	Lewis and Clark-class dry cargo ship	National Steel & Shipbuilding	San Diego, California	United States	
25 May	Roald Amundsen	Fridtjof Nansen-class frigate	Navantia	Ferrol	Spain	For Royal Norwegian Navy
27 May	Sahyadri	Shivalik-class frigate	Mazagon Dock Limited	Mumbai	India	
27 May	Smaland	Damen Container Feeder 800 container ship	Santierul Naval Damen Galati SA	Galați	Romania	
May	U34	Type 212 submarine	Nordseewerke	Emden	Germany	For German Navy
10 June	Norwegian Jewel	Jewel-class cruise ship	Meyer Werft	Papenburg	Germany	
10 June	John Lukas Dede	Sietas type 168 container ship	Schiffswerft J.J. Sietas	Hamburg-Neuenfelde	Germany	For Reederei Friedhelm Dede
12 June	Grete Mærsk	Mærsk D-class container ship	Odense Staalskibsvaerft	Lindø	Denmark	For Maersk Line
18 June	Aliança Mauá	Monte-class container ship	Daewoo Shipbuilding & Marine Engineering	Okpo	South Korea	
23 June	Majesty of the Seas	Riverboat		Sarreguemines	France	
11 July	Andrea Ehler	Sietas type 178 container ship	Schiffswerft J.J. Sietas	Hamburg-Neuenfelde	Germany	For Reederei Ehler
15 July	Tenacious	Formidable-class frigate	ST Engineering	Benoi	Singapore	
23 July	Farragut	Arleigh Burke-class destroyer	Bath Iron Works	Bath, Maine	United States	
26 July	Tonnerre	Mistral-class amphibious assault ship	Brest Arsenal	Brest	France	
5 August	CSAV Morumbi	Type Stocznia Gdynia 8184-container ship	Stocznia Gdynia	Gdynia	Poland	
12 August	Partnership	Sietas type 178 container ship	Schiffswerft J.J. Sietas	Hamburg-Neuenfelde	Germany	For Reederei Heinz-Georg Vöge
19 August	Kyoto Express	Colombo-Express-class container ship	Hyundai Heavy Industries	Ulsan	South Korea	For Hapag Lloyd
20 August	Seaconger	Tanker	Lindenau GmbH	Kiel	Germany	
24 August	Atago	Atago-class destroyer	Mitsubishi Heavy Industries	Nagasaki	Japan	
26 August	Lyme Bay	Bay-class landing ship dock	Swan Hunter	Wallsend, England	United Kingdom	
1 September	Gunvor Mærsk	Mærsk D-class container ship	Odense Staalskibsvaerft	Lindø	Denmark	For Maersk Line
2 September	Costa Concordia	Concordia-class cruise ship	Fincantieri	Sestri Ponente	Italy	For Costa Cruises
3 September	Nordwelle	Type Hyundai 2530 TEU container ship	STX Offshore & Shipbuilding	Jinhae	South Korea	
8 September	Passat	Sietas type 178 container ship	Schiffswerft J.J. Sietas	Hamburg-Neuenfelde	Germany	For Reederei Heinz Moje
5 October	Setoshio	Oyashio-class submarine			Japan	
5 October	Samskip Pioneer	Damen Container Feeder 800 container ship	Santierul Naval Damen Galati SA	Galați	Romania	
7 October	Hasselwerder	Sietas type 178 container ship	Schiffswerft J.J. Sietas	Hamburg-Neuenfelde	Germany	For Peter Döhle Schiffahrts KG
15 October	Andrea Doria	Horizon-class frigate	Fincantieri	Riva Trigoso	Italy	
29 October	Gjertrud Mærsk	Mærsk D-class container ship	Odense Staalskibsvaerft	Lindø	Denmark	For Maersk Line
14 November	Umiak I	Bulk carrier	Universal Shipbuilding Corporation	Maizuru, Kyoto	Japan	For Fednav
1 December	Galaxy	Cruiseferry	Aker Finnyards	Rauma, Finland	Finland	For Tallink
2 December	Volcan de Taburiente	Ferry	De Hijos de J. Barreras	Vigo	Spain	For Naviera Armas
9 December	Stalwart	Formidable-class frigate	ST Engineering	Benoi	Singapore	
9 December	COSCO Guangzhou	container ship	Hyundai Heavy Industries	Usan	South Korea	For COSCO
9 December	Chicago Express	Colombo-Express-class container ship	Hyundai Heavy Industries	Ulsan	South Korea	For Hapag Lloyd
12 December	Daniel	Sietas type 178 container ship	Schiffswerft J.J. Sietas	Hamburg-Neuenfelde	Germany	For Peter Döhle Schiffahrts KG
16 December	Samskip Explorer	Damen Container Feeder 800 container ship	Santierul Naval Damen Galati SA	Galați	Romania	
16 December	CMA CGM Melbourne	Type Stocznia Gdynia 8184-container ship	Stocznia Gdynia	Gdynia	Poland	
22 December	MSC Davos	Type Stocznia Gdynia 8184-container ship	Stocznia Gdynia	Gdynia	Poland	
22 December	Gerd Mærsk	Mærsk D-class container ship	Odense Staalskibsvaerft	Lindø	Denmark	For Maersk Line
24 December	OOCL Asia	OOCL SX-class container ship	Geoje	Samsung Heavy Industries	South Korea	For Orient Overseas Container Line
28 December	Gridley	Arleigh Burke-class destroyer	Bath Iron Works	Bath, Maine	United States	
Unknown date	Clay Barge No. 8	Motor barge	David Abels Boatbuilders Ltd.	Bristol	United Kingdom	For Waterways Ireland.
Unknown date	Leanne McLoughlin	Tug	David Abels Boatbuilders Ltd.	Bristol	United Kingdom	For John McLoughlin & Son (Shipping) Ltd.
Unknown date	Noleen McLoughlin	Tug	David Abels Boatbuilders Ltd.	Bristol	United Kingdom	For John McLoughlin & Son (Shipping) Ltd.
