= Italian destroyer Caio Duilio =

Destroyer of the Italian Navy

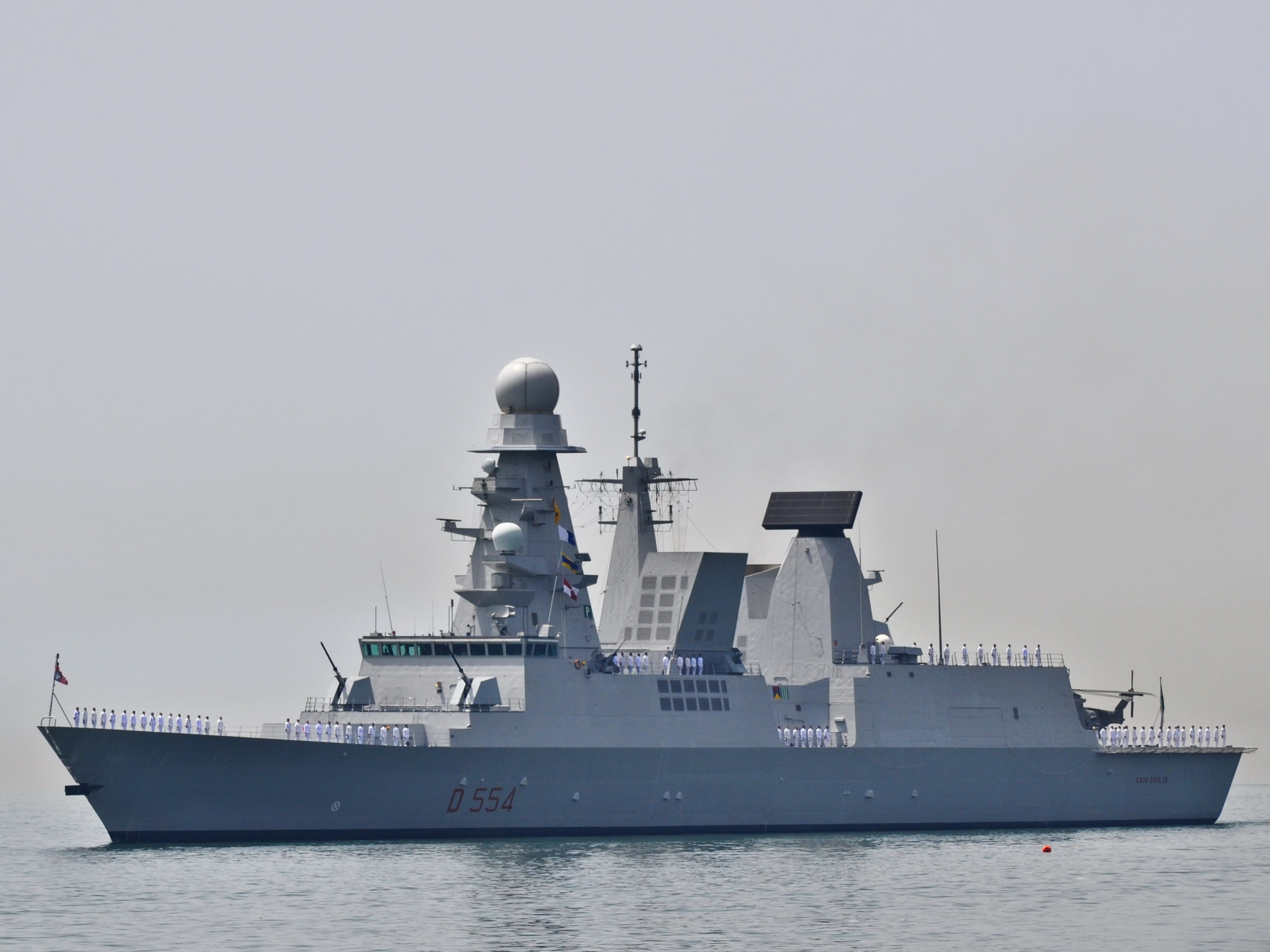
- Caio Duilio on 10 June 2010

History

Italy
- Name: Caio Duilio
- Namesake: Gaius Duilius
- Ordered: 27 October 2000
- Builder: Horizon Sas and Fincantieri. Riva Trigoso and Muggiano shipyards.
- Laid down: 19 September 2003
- Launched: 23 October 2007
- Commissioned: 3 April 2009
- In service: 22 September 2011
- Home port: La Spezia
- Identification: MMSI number: 247039999; Hull number: D 554; ITU:
- Motto: Nomen Numen
- Status: Active

General characteristics
- Class & type: Orizzonte-class destroyer
- Displacement: 7,050 t (6,940 long tons); 7,770 t (7,650 long tons) full load
- Length: 152.9 m (501 ft 8 in)
- Beam: 20.3 m (66 ft 7 in)
- Draft: 7.6 m (24 ft 11 in)
- Installed power: 4 diesel generators Isotta Fraschini VL1716T2ME (1,680 kW each); 2 power stations
- Propulsion: CODOG: 2 GE/Avio LM2500 gas turbine engines 20.5 MW each; 2 SEMT Pielstick 12 PA6 STC diesel engines 4.32 MW each; 2 Variable pitch propellers; 1 Bow thruster
- Speed: 29 knots (54 km/h; 33 mph) (gas turbine engines); 18 knots (33 km/h; 21 mph) (diesel engines)
- Range: 7,000 nmi (13,000 km; 8,100 mi) at 18 knots; 3,500 nmi (6,500 km; 4,000 mi) at 24 kn
- Endurance: 45 days
- Capacity: Accommodations for 255
- Complement: 24 officers; 87 petty officers; 82 sailors
- Crew: 193 + 37 Staff including Boarding/Security and Flight teams
- Sensors & processing systems: Surface search radar in E/F band Selex RAN 30X/I (RASS); Multi-functional 3D phased array radar in G band Selex SPY-790 (EMPAR) (Principal sensor of PAAMS); Long Range 3D Radar in D band Thales/Selex S1850M; Secondary Surveillance Radar Selex SIR R/S; Navigation and Helo decking radar in I band Selex SPN 753(V)4 (NAVR); 2 Multi-Sensor target indiction system NA 25X (Radar and electro-optical sensor RTN-30X); Bispectral IR detection and tracking system Sagem Vampir MB (IRAS); ESM System SLQ-750 made-up by a WB (Wideband) receiver and 2 HSFA (Superheterodyne) receivers; Medium frequency hull sonar Thales UMS 4110CL; Electronic Warfare (Nettuno 4100): 2 Radar Jammers; 2 Oto Melara SCLAR-H decoys launcher system for chaff and flares; Anti-torpedo system SLAT: Low frequency towed array sonar; 2 acoustic decoy launchers
- Armament: Artillery: 3 Oto Melara 76/62 mm Davide/Strales Super-Rapid guns (ILDS, updated to Strales version since 2017); 2 Oto Melara 25/80 with Oerlikon KBA 25mm guns; 2 SITEP LRAD MASS CS-424 acoustic guns (since 2017); Torpedoes: 2 EuroTorp torpedo tubes B515/1 with semi-automatic handling system for MU 90 lightweight torpedoes; Missiles: PAAMS; (Principal Anti-Air Missile System) 6 DCNS Vertical Launch System Sylver A50 modules with 48 cells for MBDA short range Aster 15 or medium range Aster 30 missiles + fitted for 16 cells additional; 8 S/S Teseo Mk2/A missile launchers
- Aircraft carried: 1 AgustaWestland AW101; or; 1 NHIndustries NH90; armed with MU90 torpedoes or Marte Mk2/S A/S missiles

Caio Duilio is a destroyer of the Italian Navy. She and her sister Italian destroyer Andrea Doria form the Andrea Doria class; in turn these two ships, and the French vessels Forbin and Chevalier Paul, belong to the Horizon class. Caio Duilio is marked by hull number D 554 according to NATO classification.

== History ==
=== Background ===
The ship takes her name from the 3rd century BC Roman leader and admiral Gaius Duilius (Caio Duilio in Italian). Duilius ordered the construction of 120 ships that were armed with hooked bridges called corvus, Latin for “crow”. This innovation allowed the Romans to defeat the powerful enemy fleet of Carthage transforming the naval battle into a melee combat.

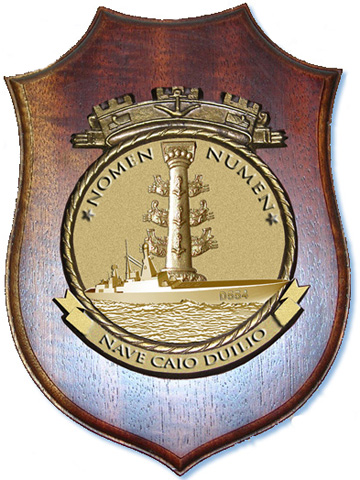
The Coat of Arms of Caio Duilio

After the victory over the Carthaginians at the Battle of Mylae in 260 BC, Duilius was honored with a triumphal parade and the erection in the Roman Forum of a column adorned with the beaks of captured Carthaginian warships; the column both became his symbol and appears today in the coat of arms of the ship.

The destroyer Caio Duilio is the fourth Italian warship with this historical name. The first, the ironclad Duilio, was commissioned in 1886 and served until 1909. Fitted with the largest guns available, 100-ton 450 mm calibre muzzle-loading guns, she was regarded as the most powerful warship afloat in her day. The second unit, the Andrea Doria-class battleship Duilio, was commissioned on 24 April 1913 and was subsequently refitted in 1937, serving in the Regia Marina during World War I and World War II; while the third, the Andrea Doria-class missile cruiser Italian cruiser Caio Duilio, was commissioned in 1960 and served until 1990 during the Cold War. Caio Duilio was launched on October 23, 2007, and transported to Muggiano shipyard on October 29 for the mounting of the combat system.

Caio Duilio's motto refers to the ancient Roman tradition, in which the name acquires religious connotations. Some ancient fragments point up this intimate meaning. "Nomen Numen" can be translated as "the name means power".

== Description ==
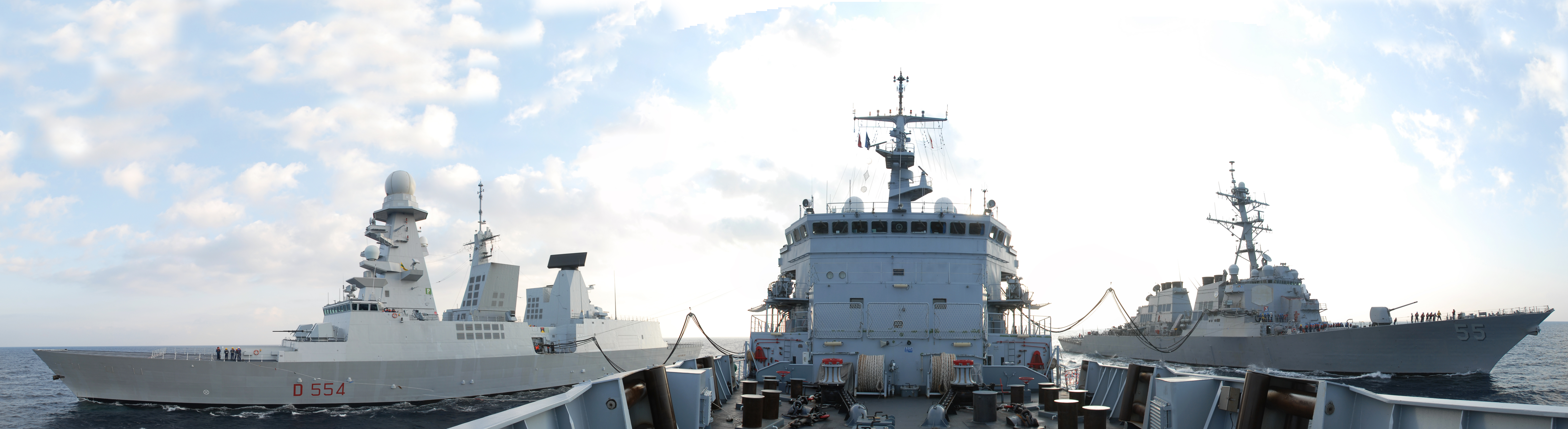
Caio Duilio (left) with USS Stout (right) seen from the bow of Etna

Caio Duilio is a multirole ship, with a bias towards anti-aircraft warfare (the ship is much more capable in this role than the older destroyers) and short and medium-range defence capabilities. She is also highly capable in anti-submarine and anti-surface warfare.

The ship has been designed to take and operate with Rotary wing aircraft (AW101 and NH-90) of much higher performance and more autonomy than previous generation helicopters. The handling of wheeled helicopters on the flight deck is guaranteed up to sea state 6 by the semi-automatic Canadian system TC-ASIST of Indal Technologies committing to these operations a single operator.

By type of ship and technology aboard Caio Duilio is able to cover a broad spectrum of maritime activities, ranging from high-intensity military operations to Maritime Security operations. The missions that the unit can perform are:

- Escort role in an aircraft carrier battle group or naval convoy;
- Command and control of joint and combined maritime operations in all forms of aeronaval warfare;
- Naval Command in support or integrated in the National Air Defense organization;
- Relief operations in case of natural disasters, crisis response and humanitarian operations;
- Counter-piracy operations.

The ship was designed to be as little detectable by radar as possible, by using stealth technology for the hull and superstructure. Sea-keeping in unfavorable weather conditions is granted by two pairs of stabilizers.

The acoustic signature was also reduced with an appropriate choice of machinery and engineering solutions and verifying the intensity of the radiated noise, since the design phase. Equal attention has been directed in the infrared (IR) signature branch, by lowering the temperature of engine gases through coaxial exhausts.

=== Combat system ===
After the abandonment of the old system of command and control SADOC, which is used in the latest modernized version in the Durand de la Penne and Maestrale classes, an integrated type CMS (Command Management System) based on Linux OS was installed by EuroSysNav. This is provided with 10 redundant servers and 24 consoles named MFC (Multi Function Console), of which 19 are located in the Primary CIC (Combat Information Centre), 3 in the secondary CIC in a remote area from the primary CIC, 1 in the Admiral CIC (for staff at the level of CTF/CTG, equipped with special command support systems) and 1 in the bridge for the officer of the watch.

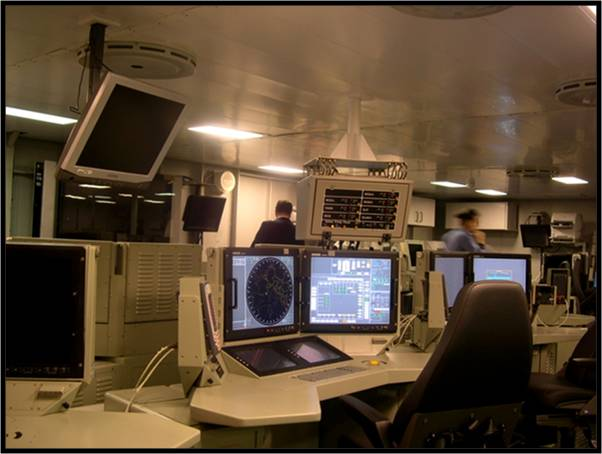
The Combat Information Centre

With a MFC each operator, once logged in with own user name and password, can access to all relevant tactical data to his role and has also the possibility to use some common features such as watching the video of cameras or of the IR system, the weapons engagement plan, the situation of the hardware and software subsystems, the flight orders or the weather situation. Web-browsing allows a range of information going from messaging, data exchange with the Command Support System, the weather state and information pages of various kinds.

Once put the ships to escort and the relative priority in the CMS, the system automatically performs the control and the evaluation of dangerous of each air target, and suggests the possible engagement with missiles, artillery or jammers. The system can control up to 24 Aster missiles simultaneously in flight, providing to operators the kill assessment.

There is also a training module that, under the supervision of an "Exercise Director", simulates of complex tactical situations by faithfully reproducing the capabilities of weapons and sensors on board. This allows conducting exercises which were previously possible only with the ship actually at sea.

For the first time in the history of the Italian Navy a ship is provided with an autonomous meteorological and oceanographic system (Metoc), capable of launching atmospheric balloons to make sonar, optical sensors and radar range prediction.

All subsystems, in integrated mode, operate directly managed by the CMS, but in case of battle damage can be managed locally, thus providing a combat Unity survival.

The DCNS Multi-link system, to be replaced in next future with Elsag Datamat M-DLP (Multi Data Link Processor), allows the simultaneous handling of multiple network links (with gateway and forwarding functions) of Link 11, Link 16 type, on radio or on satellite vector. These vectors, also for the voice comms, are fully integrated and managed by the CMS through the subsystem FICS (Fully Integrated Communications System) by Thales Communications.

=== Platform ===
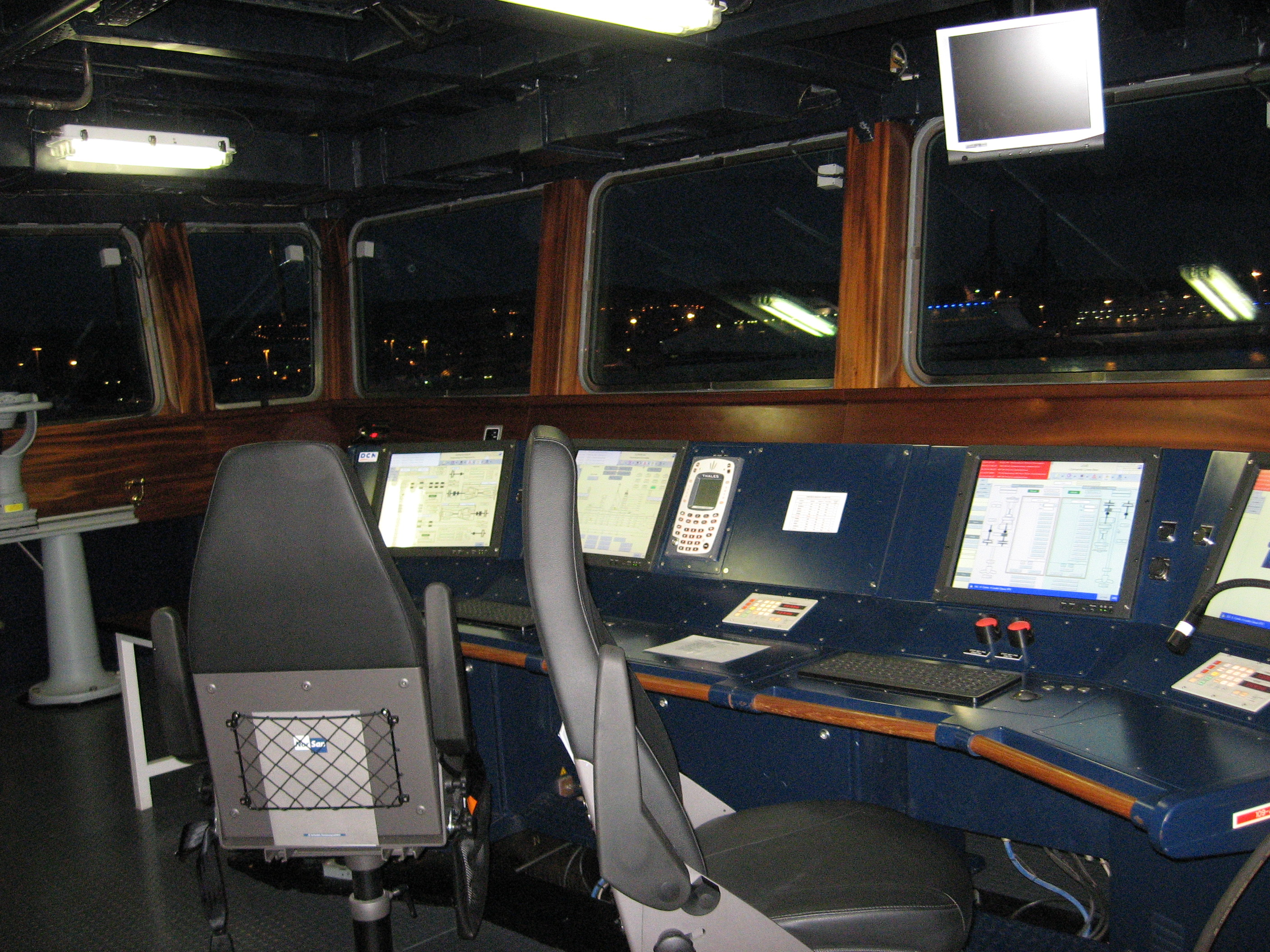
The PMS console on the bridge

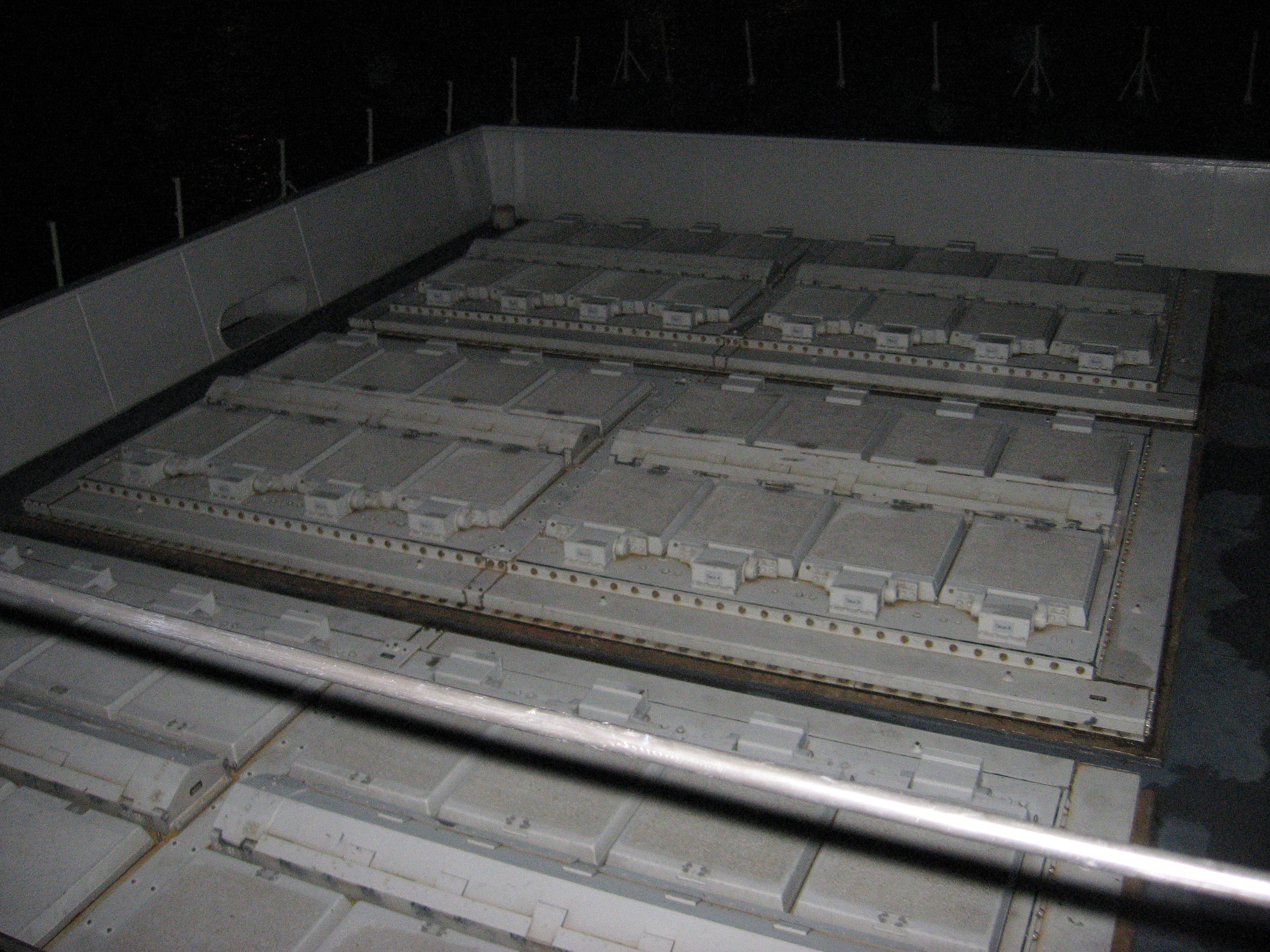
The VLS Sylver A50

The Platform Management System (PMS), designed by DCNS, allows to command and monitor machinery, electrical equipment, auxiliary services and security services. The entire system can be managed by a simple laptop but it has its own dedicated consoles in the Operative Platform Office, in the two Security Control Posts (fore and aft), on the bridge and in every technical areas.

The unit's hull is divided into two vulnerability areas by a double bulkhead and a cofferdam to improve anti-fire and anti-flooding characteristics. Each vulnerability area is in turn formed by two security zones divided into watertight compartments that provide buoyancy with three adjacent compartments flooded. Many systems, both of the platform than of the combat system, are duplicated so that each vulnerability area is independent by the other.

Most of the rooms are equipped with automatic fire and smoke detection systems. Moreover, every room is equipped with sprinklers for water, for the additive F-500 (higher performance compared to the foam) or CO_{2} extinguisher systems. These, unlike the previous generation units, are activated remotely from Security Post by the PMS.

For what concerns CBRN (Chemical, biological, radiological, and nuclear) warfare, there are a specially dedicated decontamination station, a series of new generation sensors for such hazards detection disseminated throughout the ship and an external prewashing facility.

The propulsion system consists of two controllable pitch propellers, which can be coupled independently of each other, via gear couplings, with a diesel engine or a gas turbine in a typical CODOG configuration. The manoeuvrability is provided by a pair of rudders and an electric powered bow thruster.

The daily production of drinking water is 50 m^{3} because of two installed reverse osmosis desalinators.

== Career ==
On February 12, 2008 Caio Duilio performed her first sea trial and was accepted into the Italian Navy on April 3, 2009. Caio Duilio is the only destroyer based at La Spezia, flagship of the Commander of First Naval Group (COMGRUPNAV 1). She took part, together with Andrea Doria and French ships Forbin and Chevalier Paul, in a joint exercise which brought together the whole Horizon class on May 5, 2009, in the Gulf of La Spezia. Caio Duilio was, along with the aircraft carrier Cavour and the training ship Amerigo Vespucci, one of the ships visitable in Civitavecchia harbour on the Day of the Unification of Italy and the Armed Forces on November 4, 2009.

She participated in the naval parades for the celebrations of the Italian Navy Day at Naples on June 10, 2010 and at La Spezia on June 10, 2011, in the presence of President Giorgio Napolitano.

During the development of many complex systems on board, and during the trials that led her many times in the Naval Station of Taranto, she made her debut in the international arena during NATO exercise Proud Manta 2011 from February 4 to February 17, 2011, in the waters of the Ionian Sea, even before the delivery of the Battle Ensign (that took place in Gaeta on September 22, 2011), working together with ships, submarines and aircraft of nine allied nations.

On March 2, 2024 Caio Duilio, in her role of flagship of Operation Aspides, the vessel shot down a drone launched by Houthi rebels in the Red Sea using her 76 mm main gun. The ship intentionally used low-cost unguided rounds instead of missiles. The drone, with characteristics similar to those used in previous attacks, was located about six kilometres (3.7 mi) from the Italian ship, flying towards it.

On 12 March 2024 Caio Duilio shot down another two enemy drones while protecting civilian ships.

On 7 September 2025, Caio Duilio participated in a Passage Exercise (PASSEX) with INS Surat (D69) of the Indian Navy.
