= Italian destroyer Andrea Doria =

Destroyer of the Italian Navy

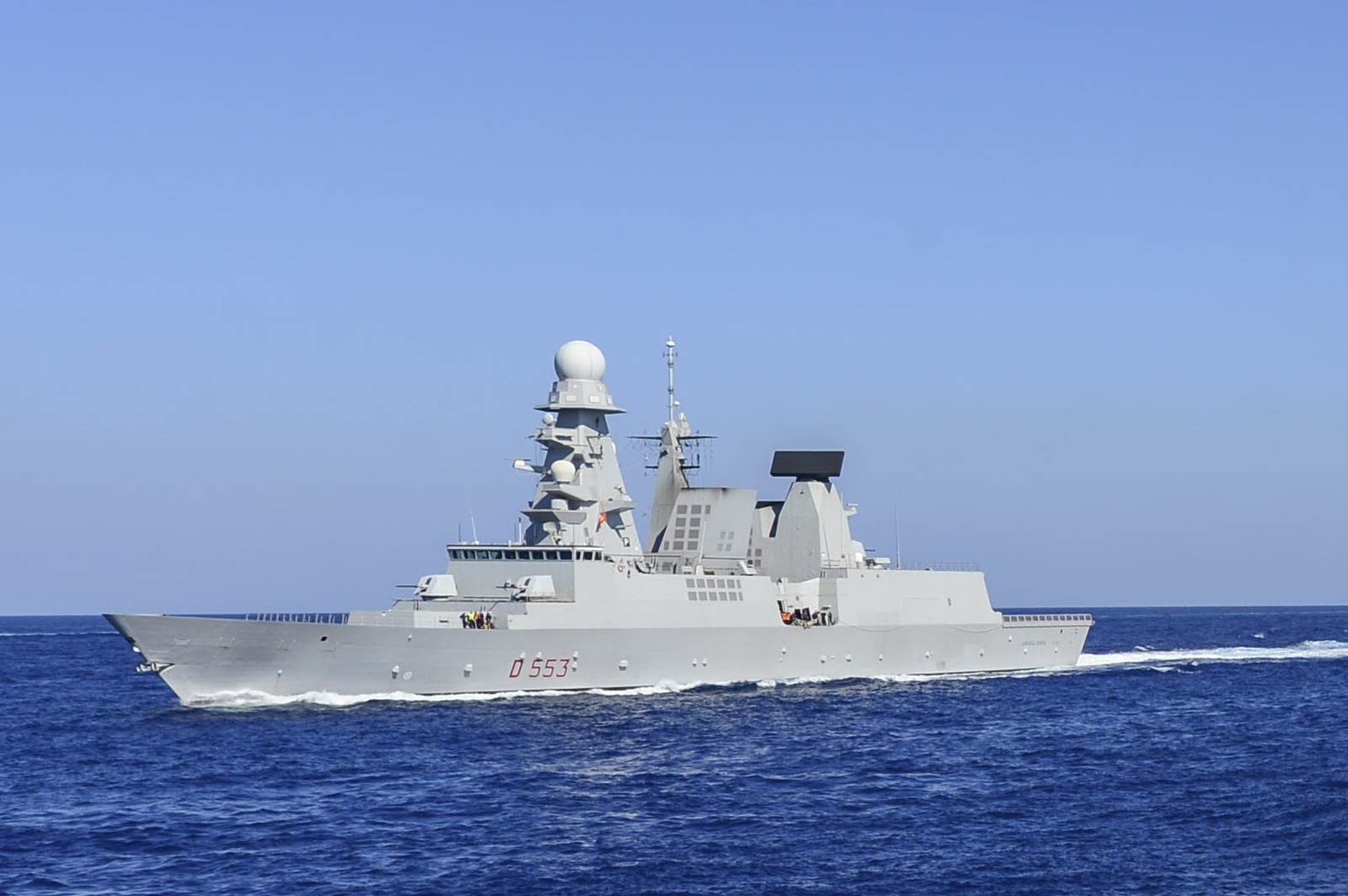
- Andrea Doria on 26 October 2013

History

Italy
- Name: Andrea Doria
- Namesake: Andrea Doria
- Ordered: 27 October 2000
- Builder: Fincantieri, Riva Trigoso shipyards
- Laid down: 19 July 2002
- Launched: 14 October 2005
- Commissioned: 22 December 2007
- Identification: MMSI number: 247150600; Callsign: IADO; Pennant number: D 553
- Motto: Altius Tendam
- Status: Active

General characteristics
- Class & type: Orizzonte-class destroyer
- Displacement: 7,050 t (7.770 t) Full load
- Length: 152.9 m (501.6 ft)
- Beam: 20.3 m (66.6 ft)
- Draft: 7.6 m (24.9 ft)
- Installed power: 4 diesel generators Isotta Fraschini VL1716T2ME (1,680 KW each); 2 power stations
- Propulsion: CODOG: 2 GE/Avio LM2500 Gas Turbine Engines 20.5 MW each; 2 SEMT Pielstick 12 PA6 STC Diesel Engines 4.32 MW each; 2 Variable pitch propellers; 1 Bow thruster
- Speed: 29 kn (Gas Turbines Engines); 18 kn (Diesel Engines)
- Range: 7,000 NM at 18 kn; 3,500 NM at 24 kn
- Endurance: 45 days
- Capacity: Accommodations for 255
- Complement: 24 officers; 87 petty officers; 82 sailors
- Crew: 193 + 37 Staff including Boarding/Security and Flight teams
- Sensors & processing systems: Surface search radar in E/F band Selex RAN 30X/I (RASS); Multi-functional 3D phased array radar in G band Selex SPY-790 (EMPAR) (Principal sensor of PAAMS); Long Range 3D Radar in D band Thales/Selex S1850M; Secondary Surveillance Radar Selex SIR R/S; Navigation and Helo decking radar in I band Selex SPN 753(V)4 (NAVR); 2 Multi-Sensor target indiction system NA 25X (Radar and electro-optical sensor RTN-30X); Bispectral IR detection and tracking system Sagem Vampir MB (IRAS); ESM System SLQ-750 made-up by a WB (Wideband) receiver and 2 HSFA (Superheterodyne) receivers; Medium frequency hull sonar Thales UMS 4110CL; Electronic Warfare (Nettuno 4100): 2 Radar Jammers; 2 Oto Melara SCLAR-H decoys launcher system for chaff and flares; Anti-torpedo system SLAT: Low frequency towed array sonar; 2 acoustic decoy launchers, WASS (Leonardo)
- Armament: Artillery: 3 Oto Melara 76/62 mm Super-Rapid guns (ILDS, updated to Strales version since 2018); 2 Oto Melara Oerlikon KBA 25/80 mm guns; 2 SITEP LRAD MASS CS-424 acoustic guns (since 2018); Torpedoes: 2 EuroTorp torpedo tubes B515/1 with semi-automatic handling system for MU 90 lightweight torpedoes; Missiles: PAAMS; (Principal Anti-Air Missile System) 6 DCNS Vertical Launch System Sylver A50 modules with 48 cells for MBDA short range Aster 15 or medium range Aster 30 missiles + fitted for 16 cells additional; 8 S/S Teseo Mk2/A missile launchers
- Aircraft carried: hangar 15mx12m 1 or 2 AgustaWestland AW101; or; 1 or 2 NHIndustries NH90; armed with MU90 torpedoes or Marte Mk2/S A/S missiles

Andrea Doria is a destroyer of the Italian Navy. She and her sister Caio Duilio form the Andrea Doria class; in turn these two ships, and the French vessels Forbin and Chevalier Paul, belong to the Horizon class. Andrea Doria has the hull number D 553 according to NATO classification.

== History ==
The destroyer is the fifth ship in the Italian Navy to bear this name, referring to the Renaissance Genoese admiral and general Andrea Doria. Andrea Doria was officially commissioned at Riva Trigoso on 22 December 2007. The motto is Altius Tendam ("To tend higher"). The current commander is Fabrizio Cerrai. Deployed to the Indian Ocean for anti-piracy operation Atalanta, Andrea Doria fought a brief action with a pirate vessel on 22 November 2011. Neither vessel was damaged and no injuries on either side resulted from the engagement.

== Description ==
Andrea Doria is a multirole ship, with a bias towards anti-aircraft warfare (the ship has an increased capacity in this type of warfare over older destroyers) and short and medium defence range capabilities. She is also highly capable in anti-submarine and anti-surface warfare.

The ship has been designed to take and operate with rotorcraft (AW101 and NH-90) of much higher performance and more autonomy than previous generation helicopters. The handling of wheeled helicopters on the flight deck is guaranteed up to sea state 6 by the semi-automatic Canadian system TC-ASIST of Indal Technologies committing to these operations a single operator.

Andrea Doria is able to cover a broad spectrum of maritime activities, ranging from high-intensity military operations to maritime security operations. The missions that the unit can perform are:

- Escort role in an aircraft carrier battle group or naval convoy;
- Command and control of joint and combined maritime operations in all forms of aeronaval warfare;
- Naval Command in support or integrated in the National Air Defense organization;
- Relief operations in case of natural disasters, crisis response and humanitarian operations;
- Counter-piracy operations.

The ship was designed to be as little detectable by radar as possible, by using stealth technology for the hull and superstructure. Sea-keeping in unfavorable weather conditions is granted by two pairs of stabilizers.

The acoustic signature was also reduced with an appropriate choice of machinery and engineering solutions and verifying the intensity of the radiated noise, since the design phase. Equal attention has been directed in the infrared (IR) signature branch, by lowering the temperature of engine gases through coaxial exhausts.

=== Combat system ===
After the abandonment of the old system of command and control SADOC, which is used in the latest modernized versions of the Durand de la Penne-class destroyers and Maestrale-class frigates, an integrated type CMS (Command Management System) based on Linux OS was installed by EuroSysNav. This is provided with 10 redundant servers and 24 consoles named MFC (Multi Function Console), of which 19 are located in the Primary CIC (Combat Information Center), 3 in the secondary CIC in a remote area from the primary CIC, 1 in the Admiral CIC (for staff at the level of CTF/CTG, equipped with special command support systems) and 1 in the bridge for the officer of the watch.

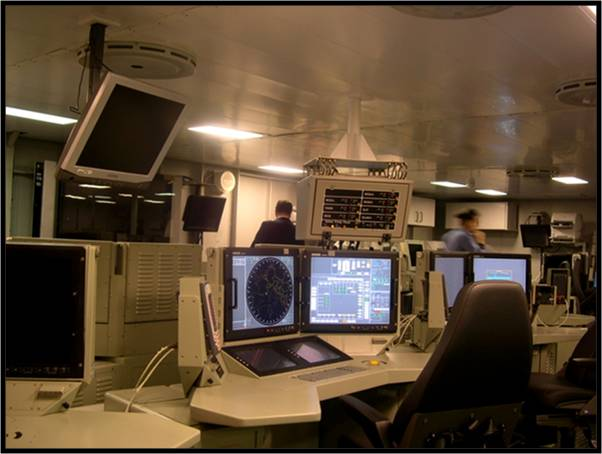
The Combat Information Centre.

With an MFC, each operator, once logged in with own user name and password, can access to all relevant tactical data to his role and has also the possibility to use some common features such as watching the video of cameras or of the IR system, the weapons engagement plan, the situation of the hardware and software subsystems, the flight orders or the weather situation. Web-browsing allows a range of information going from messaging, data exchange with the Command Support System, the weather state and information pages of various kinds.

Once put the ships to escort and the relative priority in the CMS, the system automatically performs the control and the evaluation of dangerous of each air target, and suggests the possible engagement with missiles, artillery or jammers. The system can control up to 24 Aster missiles simultaneously in flight, providing to operators the kill assessment.

There is also a training module that, under the supervision of an "Exercise Director", allows the simulation of complex tactical situations faithfully reproducing the capabilities of weapons and sensors on board and allowing you to place exercises were previously possible only with the ship actually at sea.

For the first time in the history of the Italian Navy a ship is provided with an autonomous meteorological and oceanographic system (Metoc), capable of launching atmospheric balloons to make sonar, optical sensors and radar range prediction.

All subsystems, in integrated mode, operate directly managed by the CMS, but in case of battle damage can be managed locally, thus providing a combat Unity survival.

The DCNS Multi-link system, to be replaced in next future with Elsag Datamat M-DLP (Multi Data Link Processor), allows the simultaneous handling of multiple network links (with gateway and forwarding functions) of Link 11, Link 16 type, on radio or on satellite vector. These vectors, also for the voice comms, are fully integrated and managed by the CMS through the subsystem FICS (Fully Integrated Communications System) by Thales Communications.

=== Platform ===
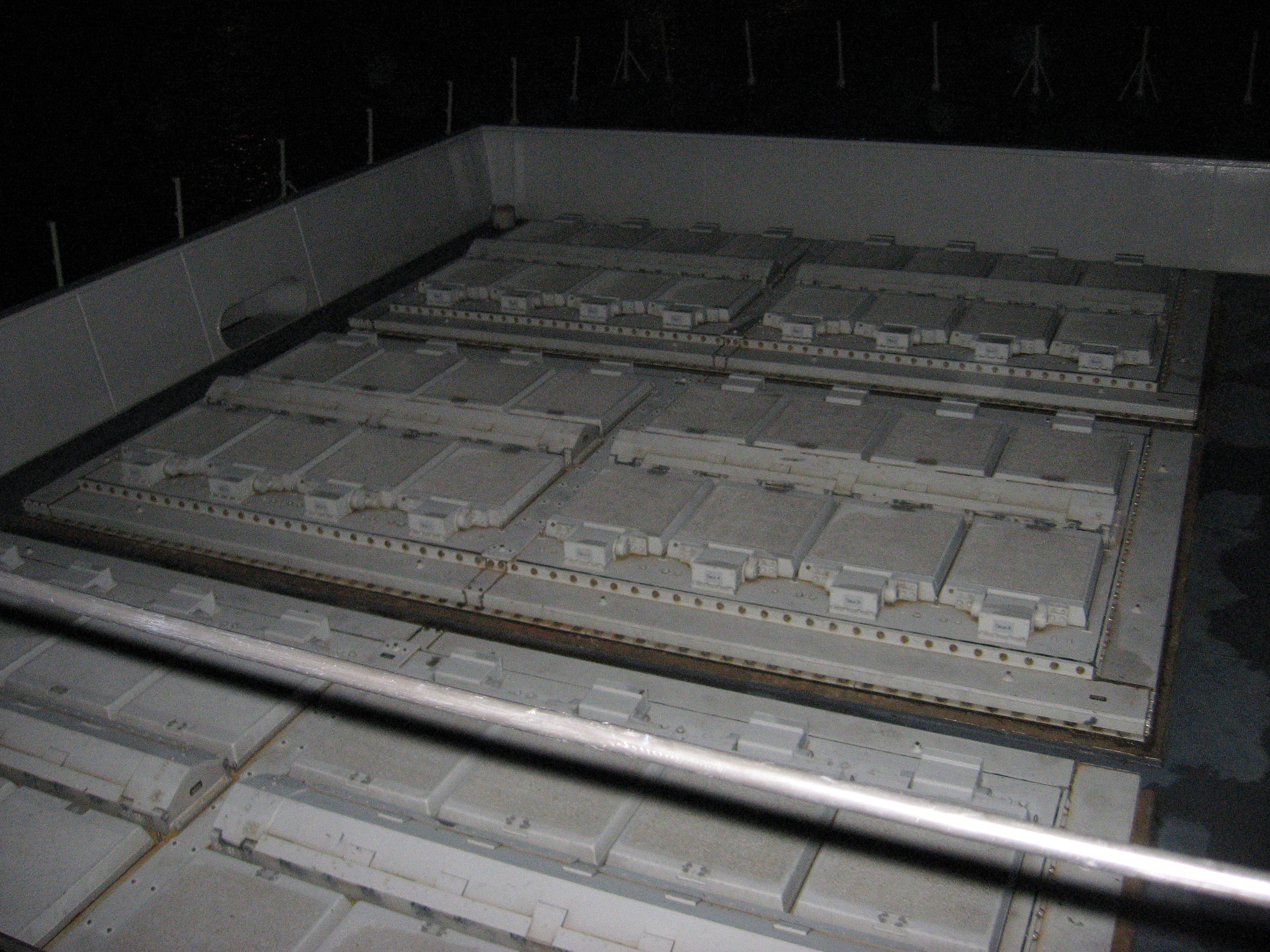
The VLS Sylver A50.

The Platform Management System (PMS), designed by DCNS, allows officers to command and monitor machinery, electrical equipment, auxiliary services and security services. The entire system can be managed by a simple laptop but it has its own dedicated consoles in the Operative Platform Office, in the two Security Control Posts (fore and aft), on the bridge and in every technical areas.

The unit's hull is divided into two vulnerability areas by a double bulkhead and a cofferdam to improve anti-fire and anti-flooding characteristics. Each vulnerability area is in turn formed by two security zones divided into watertight compartments that provide buoyancy with three adjacent compartments flooded. Many systems, both of the platform than of the combat system, are duplicated so that each vulnerability area is independent by the other.

Most of the rooms are equipped with automatic fire and smoke detection systems. Moreover every room is equipped with sprinklers for water, for the additive F-500 (higher performance compared to the foam) or CO_{2} extinguisher systems. These, unlike the previous generation units, are activated remotely from Security Post by the PMS.

For what concerns CBRN (Chemical, biological, radiological, and nuclear) warfare, there are a specially dedicated decontamination station, a series of new generation sensors for such hazards detection disseminated throughout the ship and an external prewashing facility.

The propulsion system consists of two controllable pitch propellers, which can be coupled independently of each other, via gear couplings, with a diesel engine or a gas turbine in a typical CODOG configuration. The manoeuvrability is provided by a pair of rudders and an electric powered bow thruster.

The daily production of drinking water is 50 m³ because of two installed reverse osmosis desalinators.
