= PAAMS =

Joint programme for an integrated anti-air warfare system

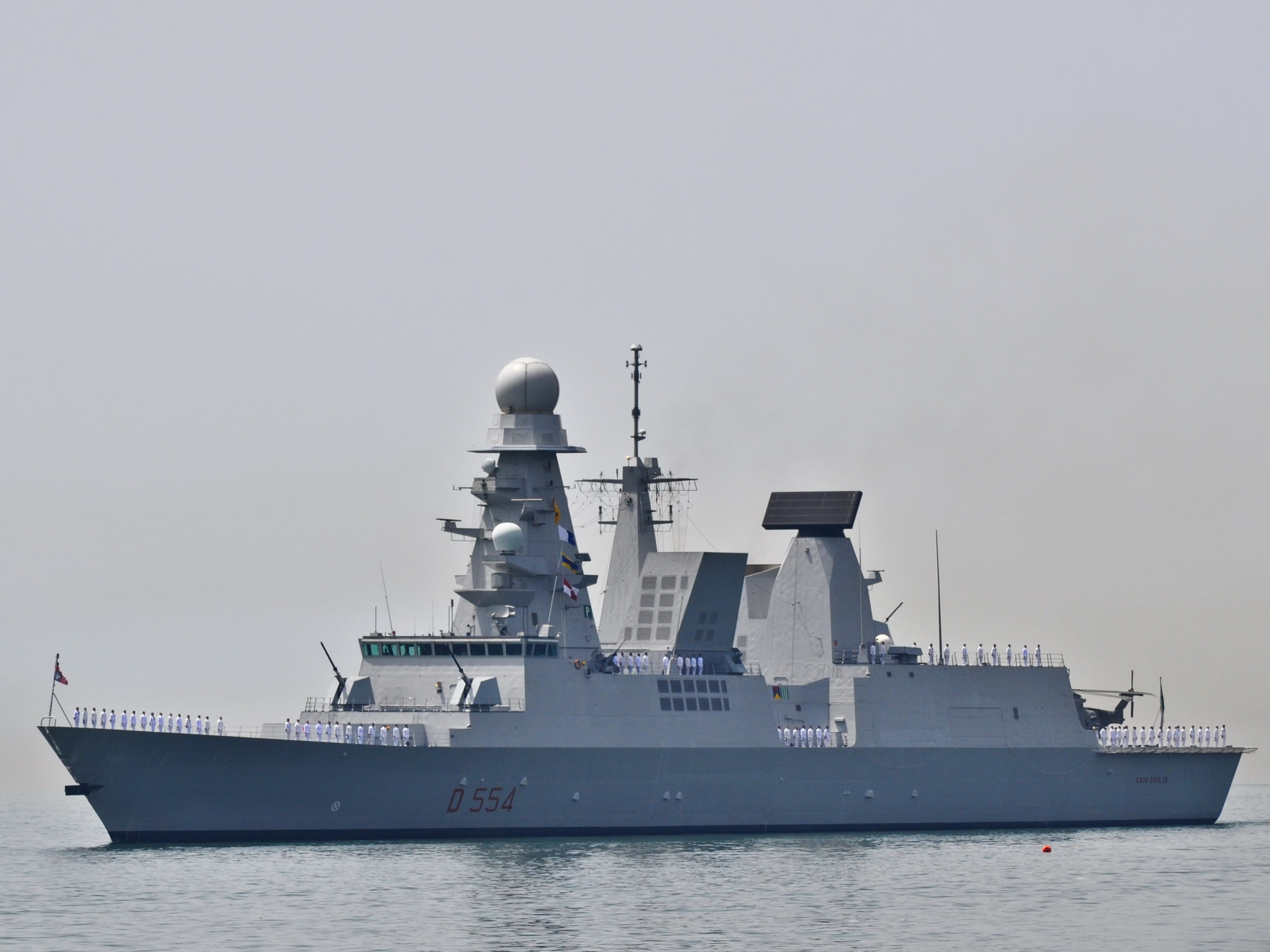
Italian Horizon-class destroyer Caio Duilio equipped with the PAAMS(E) integrated anti-aircraft warfare system

The Principal Anti-Air Missile System (PAAMS) is a joint programme developed by France, Italy, and the United Kingdom for an integrated anti-aircraft warfare system. The prime contractor is EUROPAAMS, a joint venture between Eurosam (66%) and UKAMS (33%). In the United Kingdom, PAAMS has been given the designation Sea Viper.

The system equips the Horizon-class destroyers in French and Italian service as well as the British Type 45 destroyers.

== Background ==
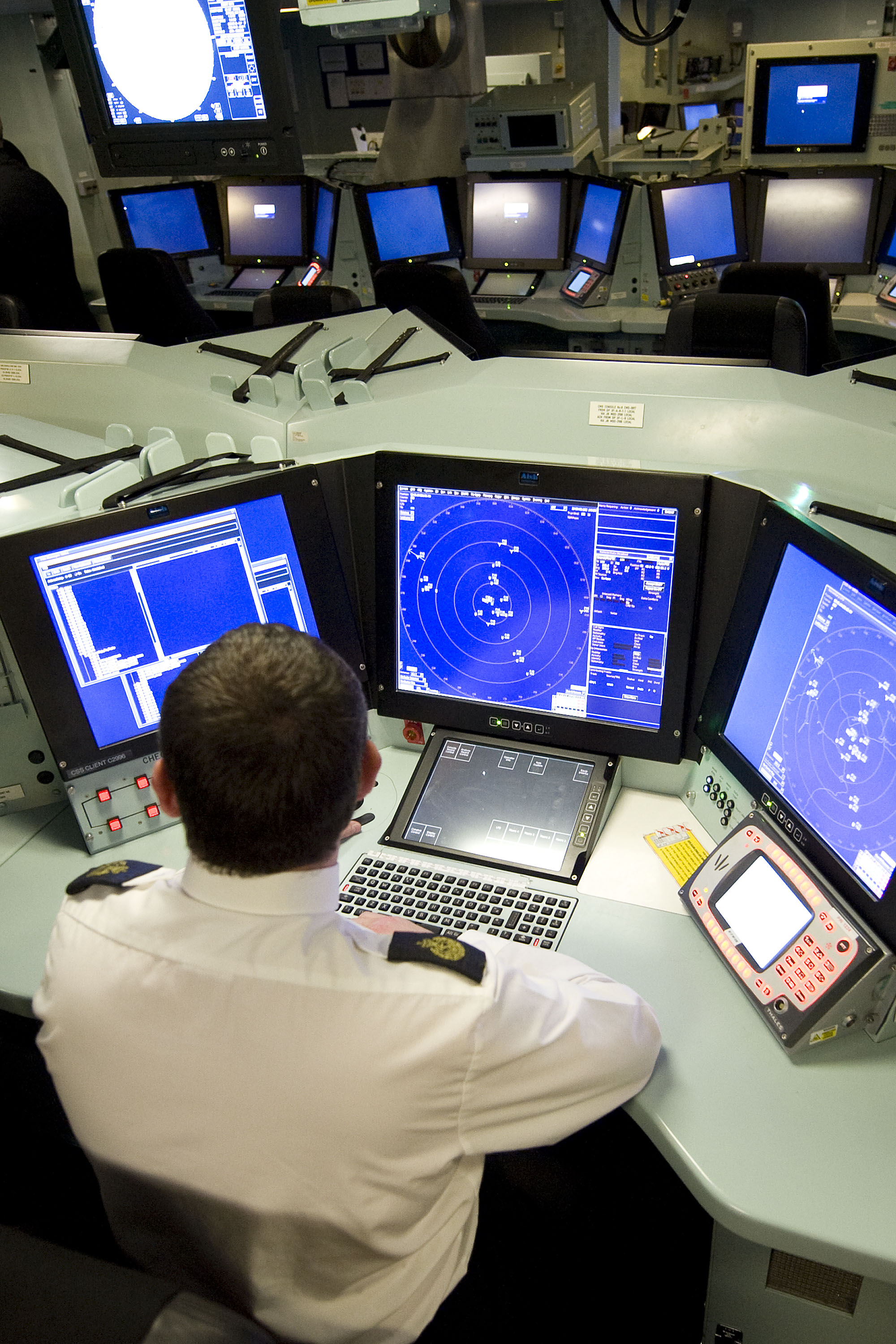
The Operations Room aboard HMS Daring, 2009

PAAMS was originally intended to be deployed in the Common New Frigate 90 (also known as the Horizon-class frigate) for the navies of the United Kingdom, France, and Italy. The French DGA placed a contract with EUROPAAMS on 11 August 1999 for the development and initial production of the PAAMS warfare system along with the associated Long Range Radar (LRR) system. The contract included one PAAMS system and one LRR for each of the first British, French, and Italian new class of warships. Irreconcilable differences in the design requirements and workshare disagreements led to the United Kingdom leaving the 'Common New Generation Frigate' project in October 1999. After withdrawing, Britain instead decided to pursue a national warship design, designated the Type 45 destroyer. The United Kingdom remained committed to the PAAMS project. As a result of efforts to achieve economies of scale, the PAAMS command and control system shares common architecture between the Horizon class and Type 45 destroyers. In 2009, PAAMS(S) was given the service name 'Sea Viper' by the Royal Navy.

=== PAAMS components ===
- PAAMS(S) — British variant with SAMPSON Multi-Function Radar (MFR)
- PAAMS(E) — French/Italian variant with EMPAR Multi-Function Radar
- Automatic command and control system
- Consoles running Windows 2000 operating system
- Sylver Vertical Launching System
- Aster missiles:
  - Aster 15, range; 1.7–30 km (1.1–18.6 mi)
  - Aster 30, range; 3–120 km (1.9–74.6 mi)

Both variants of the PAAMS operate in conjunction with the S1850M Long Range Early Warning Radar.

== Capabilities ==
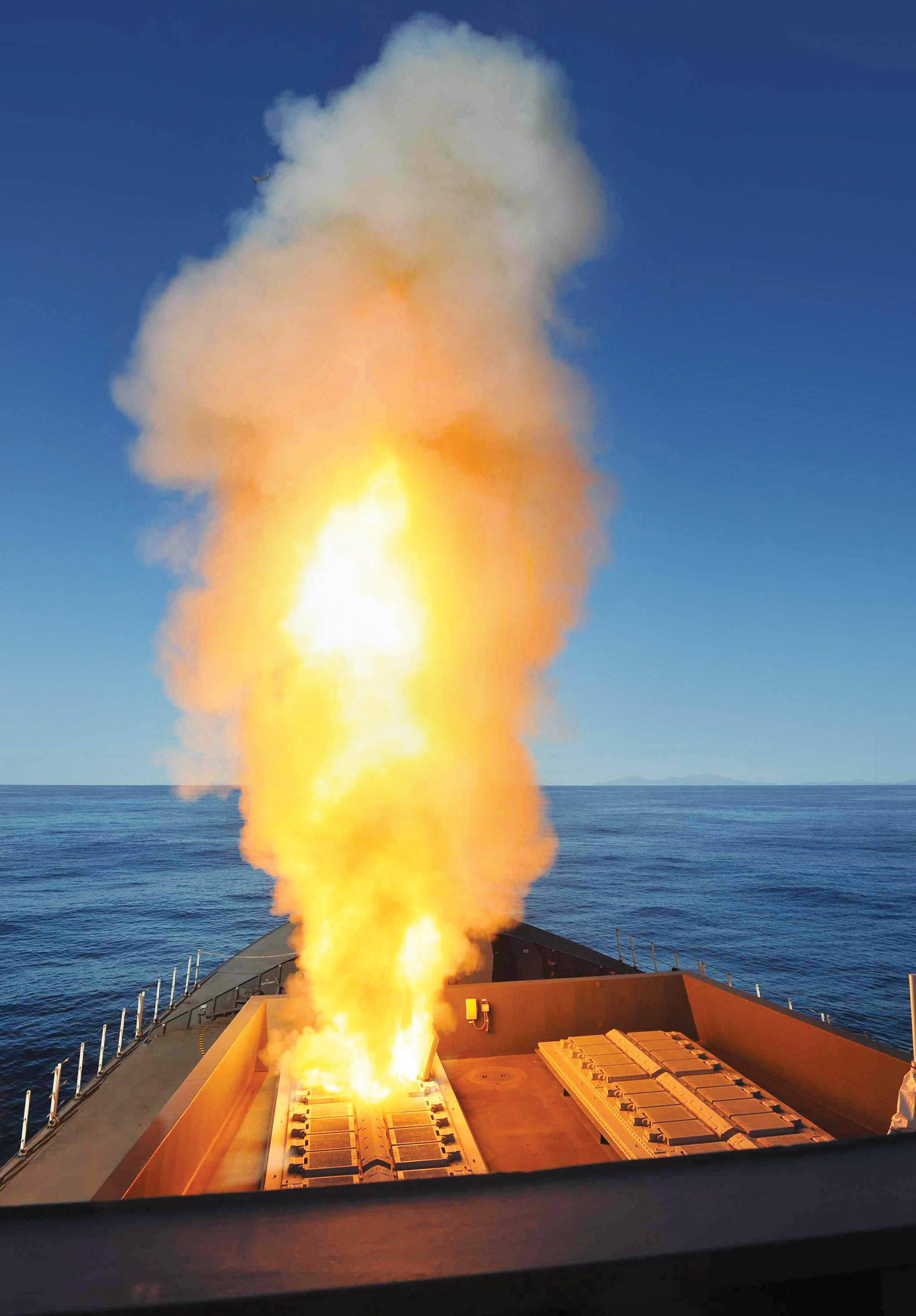
HMS Diamond firing Sea Viper surface-to-air missile for the first time

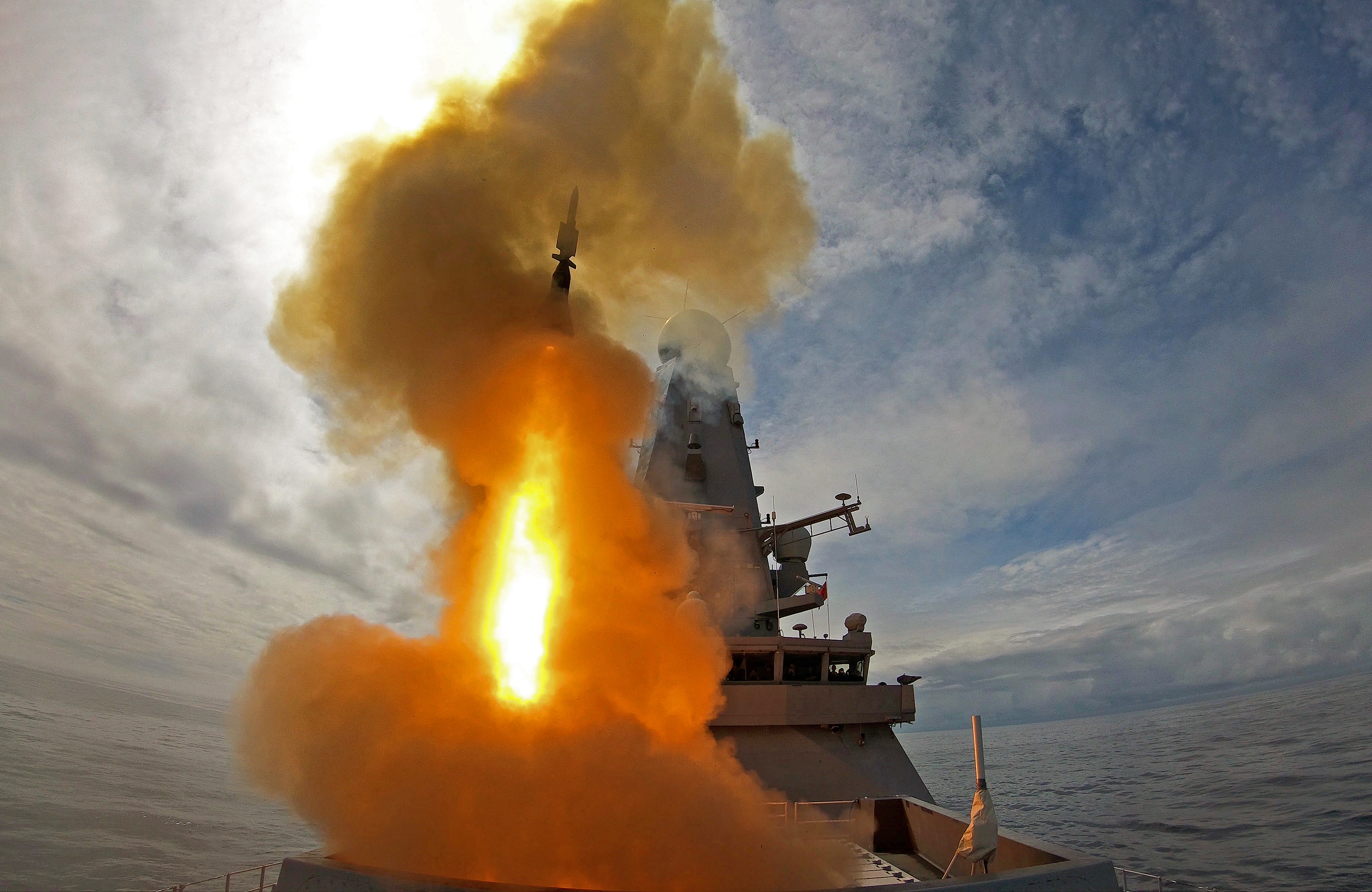
HMS Defender firing an Aster missile.

PAAMS is designed to track, target and destroy a variety of high-performance air threats, including saturation attacks of very low altitude, supersonic cruise missiles, fighter aircraft, and UAVs. PAAMS can launch eight missiles in under ten seconds with its Sylver Vertical Launching System, and simultaneously guide up to 16 missiles. The PAAMS(S) variant consists of both the SAMPSON and S1850M long-range radars and is capable of tracking in excess of 1,000 targets at ranges of up to 400 km. BAE Systems also claims that its SAMPSON radar has "excellent detection of stealth aircraft and missiles". Like the later baselines of the US Aegis Combat System, the PAAMS can engage multiple targets simultaneously.

=== Testing ===
- During its first major warfare sea exercise aboard HMS Daring, the ship's Combat Management System crashed while under simulated air attack due to a power failure, and the ship lost use of its combat management system; the ship's crew reverted to use of binoculars to spot incoming airborne threats until the CMS had been restarted.
- In 2009, two test firings of PAAMS in the British configuration from the Longbow trials barge failed due to "failures in the terminal phase of the engagement." It was believed that "production weaknesses" in a batch of Aster 30 missiles imported from France were to blame.
- Beginning with HMS Dauntless in September 2010, all of the Royal Navy's Type 45 destroyers have successfully intercepted Mirach drones with Aster missiles at the Benbecula ranges off the Outer Hebrides, Scotland. Mirach is a 13 ft (4.0 m) jet that flies at speeds of up to 600 mph (970 km/h) at altitudes as low as 10 ft (3.0 m) or as high as 14,000 ft (4.3 km).
- In April 2012, the Horizon-class frigate Forbin of the French Navy downed an American GQM-163 Coyote target simulating a sea-skimming supersonic anti-ship cruise missile travelling at Mach 2.5 (3,000 km/h, 1,900 mph) with an altitude of fewer than 5 metres (16 ft). It was the first time a European missile defence system destroyed a supersonic sea-skimming "missile". The trial was described as a "complex operational scenario".
- In September 2013, HMS Daring of the Royal Navy demonstrated the ability of her Sea Viper system to detect and track at considerable range two medium-range ballistic missiles at the Ronald Reagan Ballistic Missile Defense Test Site in the Marshall Islands, US.
- In May 2019, HMS Defender successfully used her Sea Viper system to destroy an incoming drone target as part of Exercise Formidable Shield.
- In May 2019, the French frigate Bretagne destroyed a supersonic missile flying at more than Mach 2 (2,400 km/h, 1,500 mph) with one of her Aster 15s during exercise Formidable Shield.

== Operational history ==
- France
  - On 9 December 2023, the French Navy Ship FREMM Type Frigate Languedoc shot down two UAVs heading towards the vessel in the Red Sea with Aster 15 missiles. A further drone, threatening a Norwegian tanker, was shot down on 11 December.
- United Kingdom
  - On the night of 15 December 2023, the Royal Navy Type 45 Destroyer HMS Diamond shot down a UAV targeting commercial shipping in the Red Sea with a single Sea Viper (Aster). The UAV is believed to have been launched by Houthi rebels in Yemen and marks the first time a Royal Navy ship has fired at an aerial target in anger since the Gulf War in 1991.
  - On the night of 9 January 2024, the Royal Navy Type 45 Destroyer HMS Diamond engaged numerous UAVs targeting her and commercial shipping in the Red Sea with Sea Viper (Aster) missiles. The UAVs were reported to have been launched by Houthi rebels in Yemen. The action was taken as part of a wider international operation to defend commercial shipping in the region.
  - On Wednesday 24 April 2024, HMS Diamond used a single Sea Viper (Aster) missile to shoot down a ballistic missile which had been launched from Houthi-controlled areas of Yemen and which according to American sources was likely targeting a container ship. It was the first time since the Gulf War of 1991 that the Royal Navy had intercepted any kind of missile in combat, when HMS Gloucester shot down an Iraqi Silkworm cruise missile. It is also the first time that the Royal Navy's Sea Viper system has shot down a ballistic missile in combat.

== Operators ==
=== Current operators ===
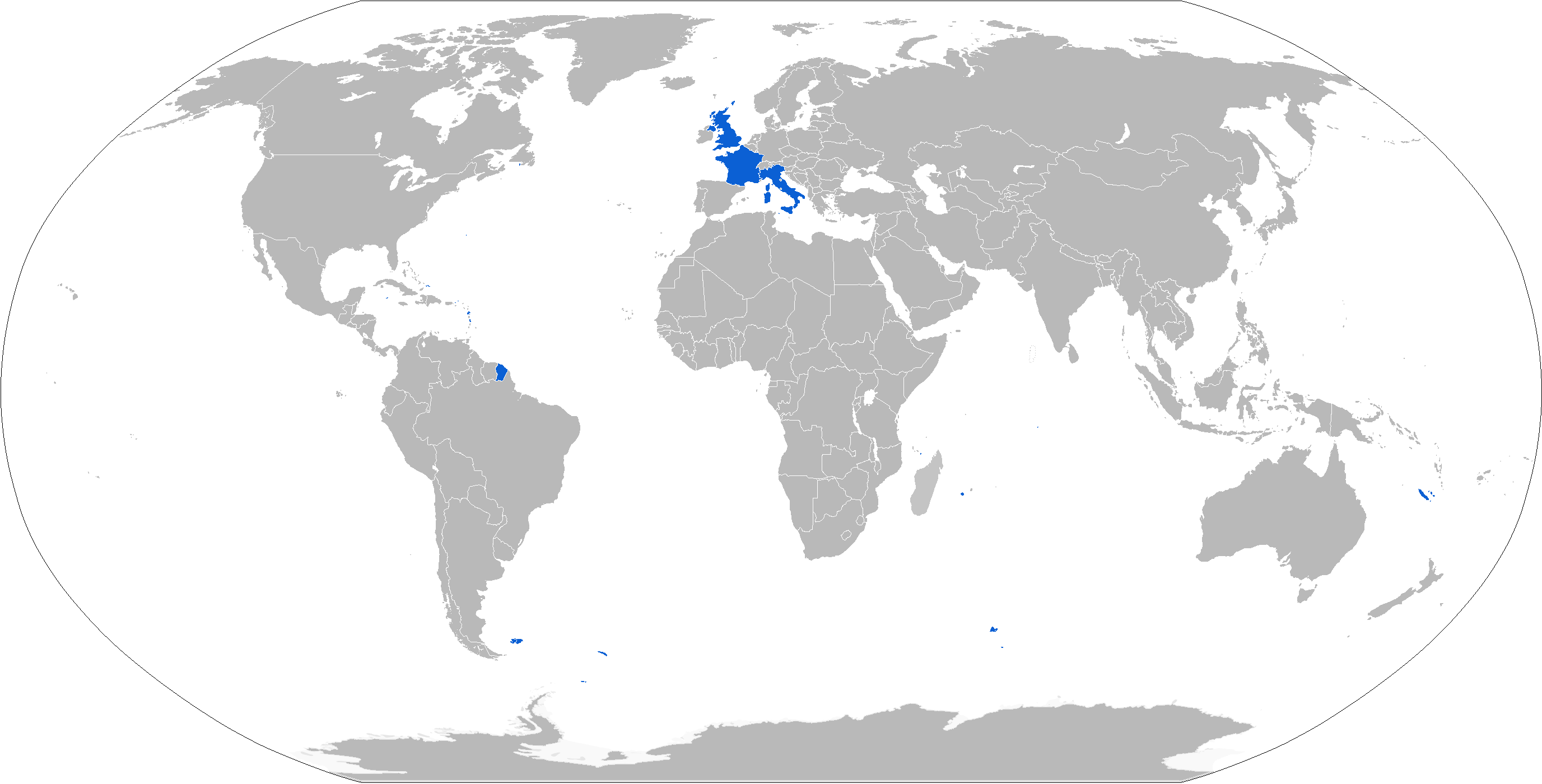
Map with PAAMS operators in blue

Algeria

- Algerian National Navy
  - Kalaat Béni Abbès class amphibious transport dock – one ship

Egypt

- Egyptian Navy
  - Aquitaine-class frigates (FREMM) – one ship
  - Bergamini-class firgates (FREMM) – two ships

France

- French Navy
  - Charles de Gaulle-class aircraft carriers – one ship
  - Horizon-class frigates – two ships
  - Aquitaine-class frigates (FREMM) – eight ships

Italy

- Italian Navy
  - Cavour-class aircraft carriers – one ship
  - Orizzonte-class frigates – two ships
  - Bergamini-class frigates (FREMM) – eight ships
  - Thaon di Revel-class offshore patrol vessels – three ships

Saudi Arabia

- Royal Saudi Navy
  - Al Riyadh-class frigates – 3 ships

United Kingdom

- Royal Navy
  - Type 45 destroyers – six ships

=== Future operators ===
France

- French Navy
  - FDI HN frigates – five ships

Greece

- Hellenic Navy
  - Kimon-class frigates – three ships (+ 1 in option)

Italy

- Italian Navy future fleet
  - Trieste-class landing helicopter docks – one ship
  - Bergamini-class frigates (FREMM multiruolo +) – two ships
  - Bergamini-class frigates (FREMM EVO) - two ships
  - Thaon di Revel class – four ships

=== Potential operators ===
Greece

- Hellenic Navy
  - Kimon-class frigates – one ship in option

== See also ==
- Aegis
- SAMP/T
- Anti-aircraft warfare
- ForceShield, French all-weather fully integrated system of Air Defence
