= DDX-class destroyer =

Italian class of guided-missile destroyers

Class overview
- Name: Guided missile destroyer
- Builders: OSN; Fincantieri; Leonardo S.p.A
- Operators: Italian Navy (future)
- Preceded by: Durand de la Penne class; Orizzonte-class guided missile destroyer
- Cost: €3.7 billion for 2 ships (as of September 2026), €1.3 billion of which in options (development, production, logistic, service support)
- Built: 2027 - 2035 (estimate)
- In service: from 2033
- Planned: 2

General characteristics
- Type: Guided missile destroyer (air and missile defence / multi-mission destroyer)
- Displacement: 13,500 tonnes
- Length: 180 m (590 ft 7 in)
- Propulsion: CODOGOL: 2 × Avio Aero LM2500+G4 turbines 32 MW (43,000 hp); 2 × propulsion diesel engines 8 MW (11,000 hp); 2 × reversible electric motors 3 MW (4,000 hp); 2 × shafts with controllable-pitch propellers and conventional rudders
- Range: 4,000 nmi (7,400 km)
- Complement: 251
- Sensors & processing systems: Systems; Fincantieri SADOC 5 C5I; Fincantieri Navis Sapiens (system of systems); Sonars: Towed sonar variable depth: N/A; Bow sonar: N/A; Mine and obstacle avoidance: N/A; Radars: 4 × AESA, S-band, fixed plates radar; Other radars: N/A; Electro-optical sensors: 4 × Leonardo NA-30S Mk2 E/O-IR-radar FCS; Communications: N/A; Navigation: N/A
- Electronic warfare & decoys: N/A
- Armament: Torpedoes: 2 × WASS B-515/3 launchers with 3 × MU90 each; VLS: 10 × 8-cell Italian vertical launch system; Missiles: Air defence: Aster 30 B1NT; Aster 15 missiles; possible integration of Albatross-NG (CAMM-ER) missiles (doubling the number of missiles within the same space as the Aster missiles); Anti-ship / land-attack missiles: Teseo Mk2/E (dedicated launchers with 4 missiles each, anti-ship); Stratus LO (Italian VLS); Stratus RS (Italian VLS); Guns: 3 × 76mm Sovraponte naval gun with DART Munition (2 × at the bow, 1 × on top of the hangar); 4 × Leonardo Lionfish RWS (Leonardo X-Gun 30)
- Aircraft carried: Up to 2 × EH-101A / SH-101A / MH-101A helicopter; Up to 2 × SH-90A / MH90A helicopter; UAV
- Aviation facilities: Rear helicopter deck; Hangar for up to 2 naval helicopters
- Notes: Boat launch: 2 × 7.33-meter SOLAS; 1 × 9.33-meter tender (for 11-meter special forces RHIB and 9-meter Fincantieri USV); Unmanned underwater vehicle

The DDX class is an Italian class of guided-missile destroyers, designed to replace the Durand de la Penne class.

The class is being built under the supervision of OCCAR, on behalf of Italy. A contract was signed the 24 September 2026 with OSN (Orizzonte Sistemi Navali S.p.A.), a joint-venture of Fincantieri and Leonardo.

== Development ==
The DPP 2020 of the Italian Ministry of Defence identified the need for a new class of destroyers to replace the Durand de la Penne class. A de-risking study was launched in 2020 for the DDX programme.

The construction was planned to start in 2023, after the final definition of the requirements would be set in 2022. The complexity of the programme and the geopolitical situation brought delays to the programme, and modifications were made to include a more powerful radar suite, and a larger number of VLS (48-cell planned in 2020, 80-cell in 2026).

The contract was signed in September 2026 instead of 2023, and the delivery expected in 2028 has been shifted to 2033.

== Ships ==
No.	Name	Builder	Status	Contract	Steel cutting	Laid down	Launched	Comm.	Notes
Italian Navy - 2 planned
TBA	TBA	Fincantieri, Italy	Under contract, in development	24 Sep 2026	-	-	-	2033	
TBA	TBA	Fincantieri, Italy	Under contract, in development	24 Sep 2026	-	-	-	2035	

Planned dates
