= ForceShield =

French integrated air defense system

ForceShield is a French all-weather fully integrated system of Air Defence.

== System ==
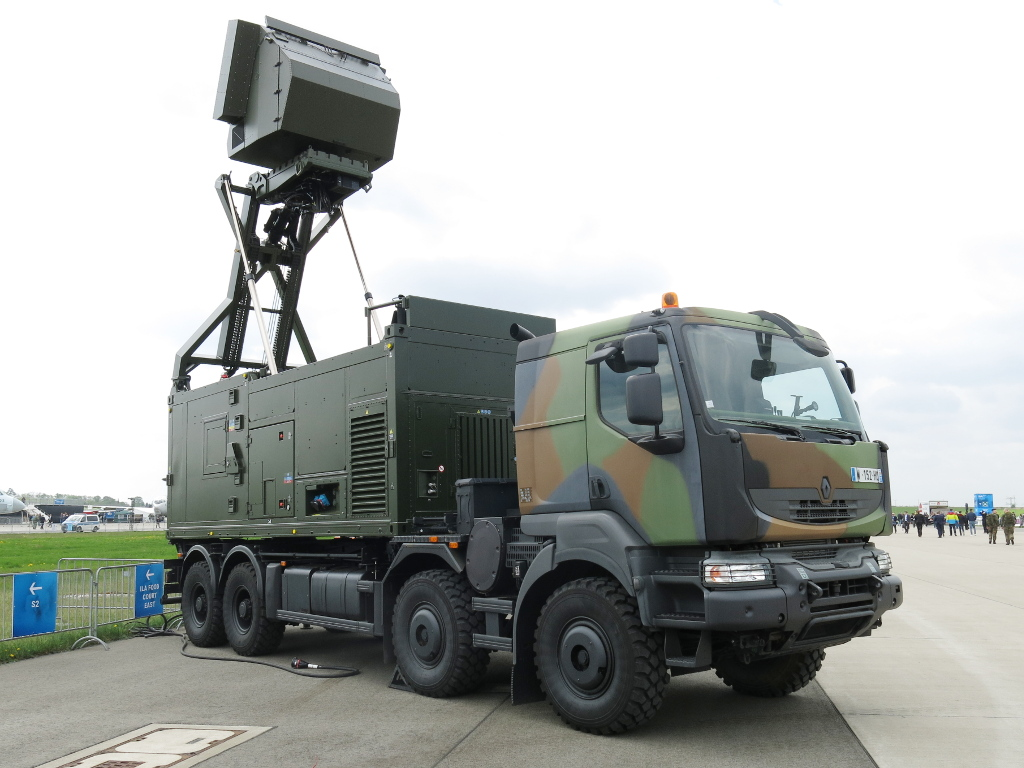
Ground Master 200

System:

- Ground Master 200, medium range AESA 3D radar
- Ground Master 200 MM/A
- ControlView
- ControlMaster 200
- RapidRanger, vehicle based, highly automated system capable of delivering a rapid reaction to threats from the air or the ground
- Lightweight Multiple Launcher – Next Generation (LML NG)
- RapidFire
- Lightweight Multirole Missile (LMM), lightweight, precision strike, multirole missile. LMM is designed to be fired from a variety of tactical platforms on land, air, and sea against a wide range of conventional and asymmetric threats, including armoured personnel carriers (APC). At Mach 1.5 with a range in excess of 6 km.
- STARStreak, High Velocity Missile (HVM) is a best in class, battle winning capability. The lightweight missile designed for short-range air defence (SHORAD) is soldier portable and capable of engaging with a wide range of diverse threats including attack helicopters, unmanned aerial systems and light skinned armoured vehicles at a range of 6km. A speed greater than Mach 3.0.

== Operators ==
=== Future operators ===
France

- French Navy
- French Air and Space Force

Portugal

- Portuguese Armed Forces

== See also ==
- PAAMS, joint programme developed by France, Italy, and the United Kingdom for an integrated anti-aircraft warfare system
