= NFR-90 =

Proposed frigate

NFR-90 (NATO Frigate Replacement for 90s) was a multi-national programme designed to produce a common frigate for several NATO nations. However, the varying requirements of the different countries led to the project being abandoned in the early 1990s.

== Project ==
The project sought to achieve economies of scale in the production of the next generation warship. Feasibility studies began in 1985 and reported that with a modularity in design, collaboration should be possible.

Arguments erupted in the design definition stage over such issues as the choice of a primary anti-ship weapon. France pushed its Exocet missile while the majority of the nations preferred the Boeing AGM-84 Harpoon. The United Kingdom in particular was uneasy about the absence of a close-in weapon system due to its experiences of being on the receiving end of Exocets during the Falklands War.

The collapse of the project was guaranteed by the withdrawal of the two largest participants, the US and UK. The US Navy was not happy with the final single mission design - the multi-mission Arleigh Burke-class destroyers demonstrate what the US had in mind. The UK considered withdrawing from the project in 1988, but committed to it to guarantee work for its shipyards and defence equipment suppliers. However, the UK finally withdrew in 1989 fearing that the requirement for a replacement for its Type 42 destroyers would not be met by the new frigate.

== Successors ==
France, Italy and the UK set up the Horizon CNGF project in 1992. This was a further attempt at collaboration that was only moderately more successful, with the UK eventually withdrawing and starting its own national project, the Type 45 destroyer. France and Italy are continued with the Horizon project, although only 4 of the 8 panned were built. Spain, Germany and the Netherlands agreed to develop a trilateral basic design, which have been built and finally developed by each nation by itself. Within the framework of the so-called Trilateral Frigate Cooperation Germany built the Sachsen-class frigate (F124), Spain the Álvaro de Bazán-class frigate (F100) and the Netherlands the De Zeven Provinciën-class frigate.

Australia's AWD Hobart-class destroyer would be evolved from the Spanish F100 class.

== Participating nations ==
- Canada
- France
- Germany
- Italy
- Netherlands
- Spain
- United Kingdom
- United States
