= French frigate Forbin =

Horizon-class frigate of the French Navy

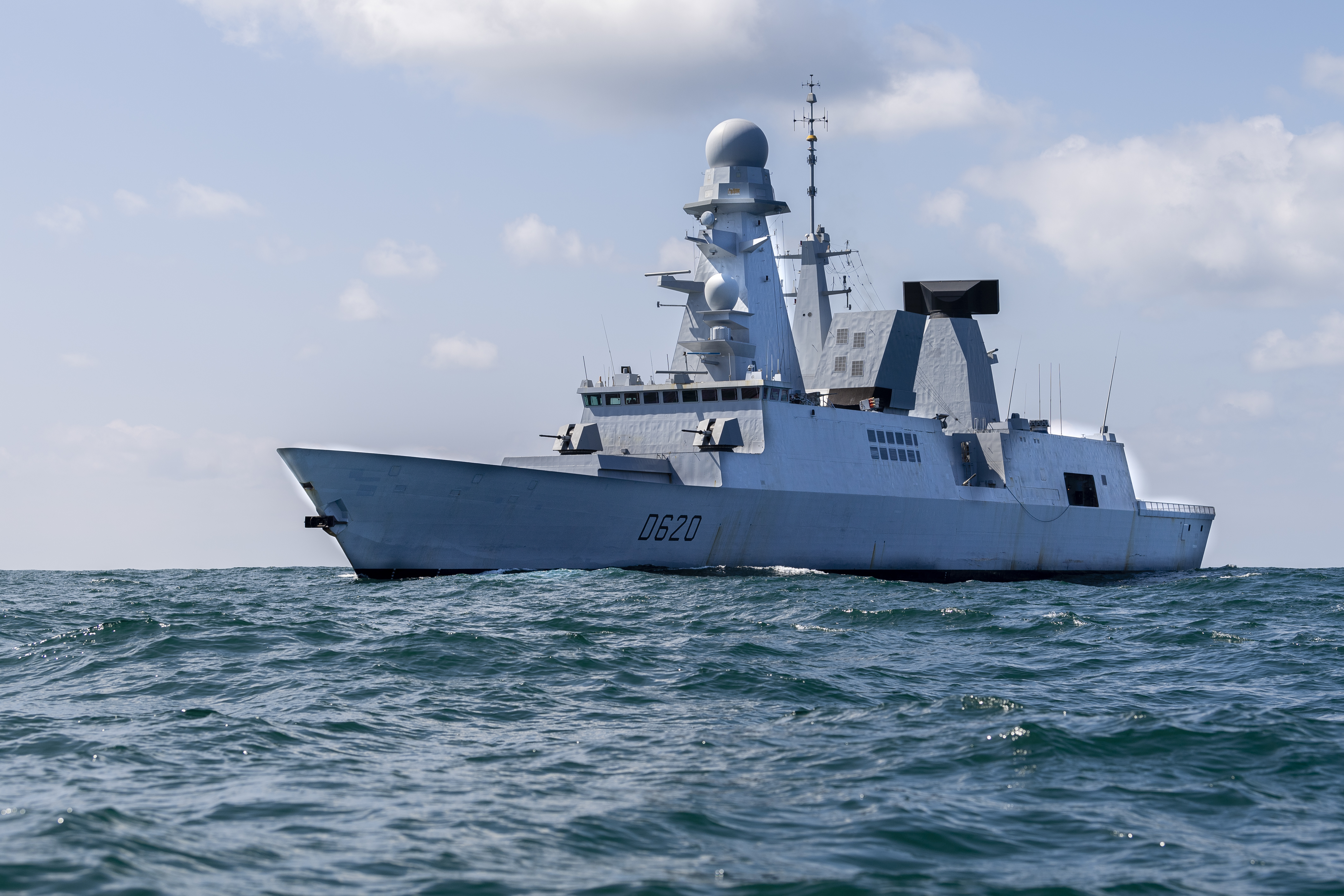
- Forbin on 21 May 2021

History

France
- Name: Forbin
- Namesake: Claude Forbin-Gardanne
- Ordered: 27 October 2000
- Builder: DCNS and Thales Group, Lorient shipyard
- Cost: USD$770 million
- Laid down: 16 January 2004
- Launched: 10 March 2005
- Christened: 2008
- Commissioned: 14 October 2010
- Home port: Toulon
- Identification: Deck code: FB; Pennant number: D620
- Status: Active

General characteristics
- Class & type: Horizon-class frigate
- Displacement: 7,050 tonnes
- Length: 152.87 m (501 ft 7 in)
- Beam: 20.3 m (66 ft 7 in)
- Draught: 5.4 m (17 ft 9 in)
- Propulsion: 2 × 23,330 kW (31,280 hp) GE/Avio LM2500 gas turbines; 2 × 4,381 kW (5,875 hp) SEMT Pielstick 12 PA6 STC diesels; 1 × beam propeller; 2 × 4-blade propellers
- Speed: 29 knots (54 km/h; 33 mph); 18 knots (33 km/h; 21 mph) on diesels
- Range: 7,000 nmi (13,000 km; 8,100 mi) at 18 kn (33 km/h; 21 mph); 3,500 nmi (6,500 km; 4,000 mi) at 25 kn (46 km/h; 29 mph)
- Boats & landing craft carried: EDO, 20-seat EFRC, Hurricane 733
- Capacity: 32 passengers or admiral's staff
- Complement: 26 officers; 110 petty officers; 38 sailors
- Sensors & processing systems: S-1850 LRR tri-dimensional sentry radar with IFF; ABF TUS 4110 CL hull sonar; Towed linear antenna with Alto torpedo detector
- Electronic warfare & decoys: Radar jammer; Communication jammer; NGDS system (2 decoy launchers, REM, RIR, LAD); Contralto system (2 acoustic decoy launchers); PAAMS EMPAR multifunction radar on G band
- Armament: Anti-air; 1 × PAAMS (48 × Aster 15 or 30 anti-air missiles in SYLVER A50 VLS); For but not with: 1 × Sadral launcher with 6 Mistral missiles space on starboard roof of hangar; Anti-ship; 8 × Exocet MM40 Block 3 anti-ship missiles (Block 3c variant entering service with the French Navy from December 2022); Anti-submarine; 2 × MU90 torpedo tubes; Guns; 2 × Otobreda 76 mm super rapid guns; 3 × Narwhal 20 mm remote-controlled naval gun
- Aircraft carried: 1 × NH90 helicopter

Forbin (D620) is a large anti-air frigate of the French Navy, lead ship of the Horizon class. Her first task is protecting aircraft carriers, capital ships or civilian ships from supersonic missile attacks; her complement of medium-range anti-air missiles allows her to support the defences of another ship under attack and avoid their saturation. She is also capable of monitoring and controlling operations carried out from the sea by friendly aircraft. Forbin is the sixth vessel of the French Navy named after the 17th century admiral Claude Forbin-Gardanne.

== Operations ==
=== Building and fitting out ===
Construction of Forbin began in Lorient on 8 April 2002. The hull was built in 14 sections by a variety of subcontractors of DCN, including several companies from Saint-Nazaire. Each section was 7 metres (23 ft) high, and 16–20 metres (52–66 ft) long. Forbin was laid down on 16 January 2004; the hull sections were transferred from Saint-Nazaire to Lorient on a barge tugged by Alcyon and assembled there from February 2004 to January 2005, finishing with the bow. The engines were delivered by FiatAvio in September.

Forbin was launched on 10 March 2005, after part of the Scorff river was dredged to make it deep enough for her draught. She was towed out of her building dock by four tugboats at 16:15, taking advantage of the tide. On 28 October, Forbin entered dry dock and underwater equipment was installed, notably the sonar, propellers and rudders.

Trials were held throughout 2006. Engine tests started on 10 May, and she sailed for sea trials on 29 June. Tuning of the combat management systems was particularly problematic, setting the completion of the ship off-schedule enough for her commissioning to be delayed by several months. In late January 2007, Forbin underwent new extensive trials at sea, successfully testing her combat systems in exercises against Super Étendard and Atlantique 2 aircraft. The PAAMS was tested in late May at the Centre d'Essais des Landes. From 12 to 17, Forbin sailed to Toulon, her new home port, where her combat, detection and weapon systems were further finetuned. Forbin fired an Aster 30 at the test range of the DGA on 25 November.

=== First cruise ===
Forbin left Toulon on 3 March 2009 for her first long cruise, visiting Morocco, the United States and Canada. She carried a Panther from Squadron 36F of the Aéronavale to validate her air installations. Forbin sailed to Casablanca, and then to Rio de Janeiro. She left Brazil on 30 March, bound for Martinique, where she arrived on 21 April. and sailed on to Norfolk, Virginia and New York, arriving on 24 April. During the transit, she carried out exercises with USS Forrest Sherman. A visit to Halifax was cancelled. Forbin was back to France in May, where she took part in the naval parade of 8 May off Sainte-Maxime. On 25 May, she was at Abu Dhabi. In June, Forbin operated with the Dwight D. Eisenhower carrier group, supporting "Operation Enduring Freedom" and maritime security operations.

=== Second cruise ===
The frigate Forbin was part of the French naval task group led by the aircraft carrier Charles de Gaulle that departed Toulon on 30 October 2010 for a four-month deployment to the Mediterranean Sea, Red Sea, Indian Ocean. and Persian Gulf. The task group commander, Rear Admiral Jean-Louis Kerignard, defined force's mission as follows:

The force would help allied navies fight piracy off the coast of Somalia and send jets to support NATO in the skies above Afghanistan.

Once on station, the Charles de Gaulle carrier task group joined two U.S. Navy carrier strike groups led by the Nimitz-class supercarriers USS Abraham Lincoln and USS Harry S. Truman operating in the Persian Gulf. Subsequently, between 7–14 January 2011, the French carrier task group led by Charles de Gaulle participated with bilateral naval exercise, code named Varuna 10, with the Indian Navy. Indian naval units participating in Varuna 10 included the Centaur-class aircraft carrier Viraat, the Godavari-class frigates Godavari and Ganga; and the Shishumar-class diesel-electric submarine Shalki. Varuna 10 was a two-phase naval exercise, with the harbor phase taking place between 7–11 January and the sea phase between 11–14 January in the Arabian Sea.

=== POLARIS 21 ===
Forbin participated in the French-led POLARIS 21 exercise.

=== Clemenceau 22 ===
Forbin deployed as part of Clemenceau 22 led by the carrier Charles de Gaulle.

=== Clemenceau 25 ===
Forbin formed a part of the carrier strike group (CSG) centred on Charles de Gaulle during the Mission Clemenceau 25 deployment that began on 28 November 2024.

On 5 January 2025, Forbin and Alsace arrived at Kochi Port. While the rest of the components of the CSG including Charles de Gaulle docked in Mormugao Port Trust Jetty, Goa, on 4 January . The CSG remained in India until 9 January. On 9 January, Forbin conducted combat manoeuvres and cross-deck helicopter deployment with INS Mormugao while departing from India joined the French CSG and her escort ships and fleet support ship during their departure from Goa and Kochi for the next phase of Mission Clemenceau 25 in the Indian and Pacific oceans. She participated in joint navigational drills and Maritime Partnership Exercise. On 12 January, Forbin docked at Swettenham Pier in George Town, the capital city of the Malaysian state of Penang, as part of Clemenceau 25. During the stopover, the crew attended a ceremony honouring the French sailors killed in the Battle of Penang. The CSG is en route to Southeast Asia to join a multinational maritime security exercise, codenamed "La Perouse", alongside the navies of Malaysia, Singapore, Australia, Canada, India, United Kingdom and the United States.

== Gallery ==
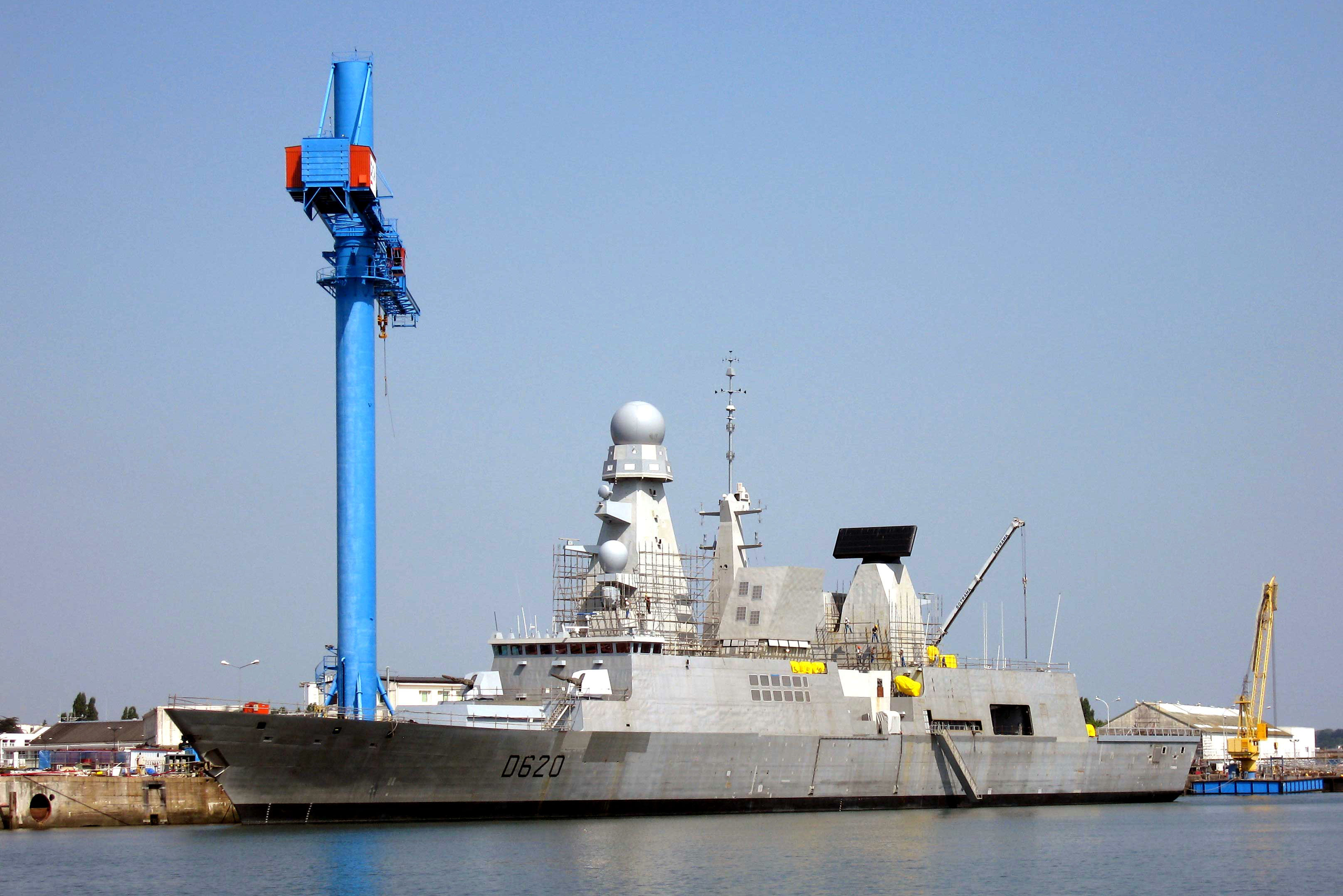
Fitting out in Lorient in July 2006

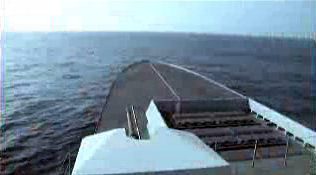
The PAAMS of Forbin

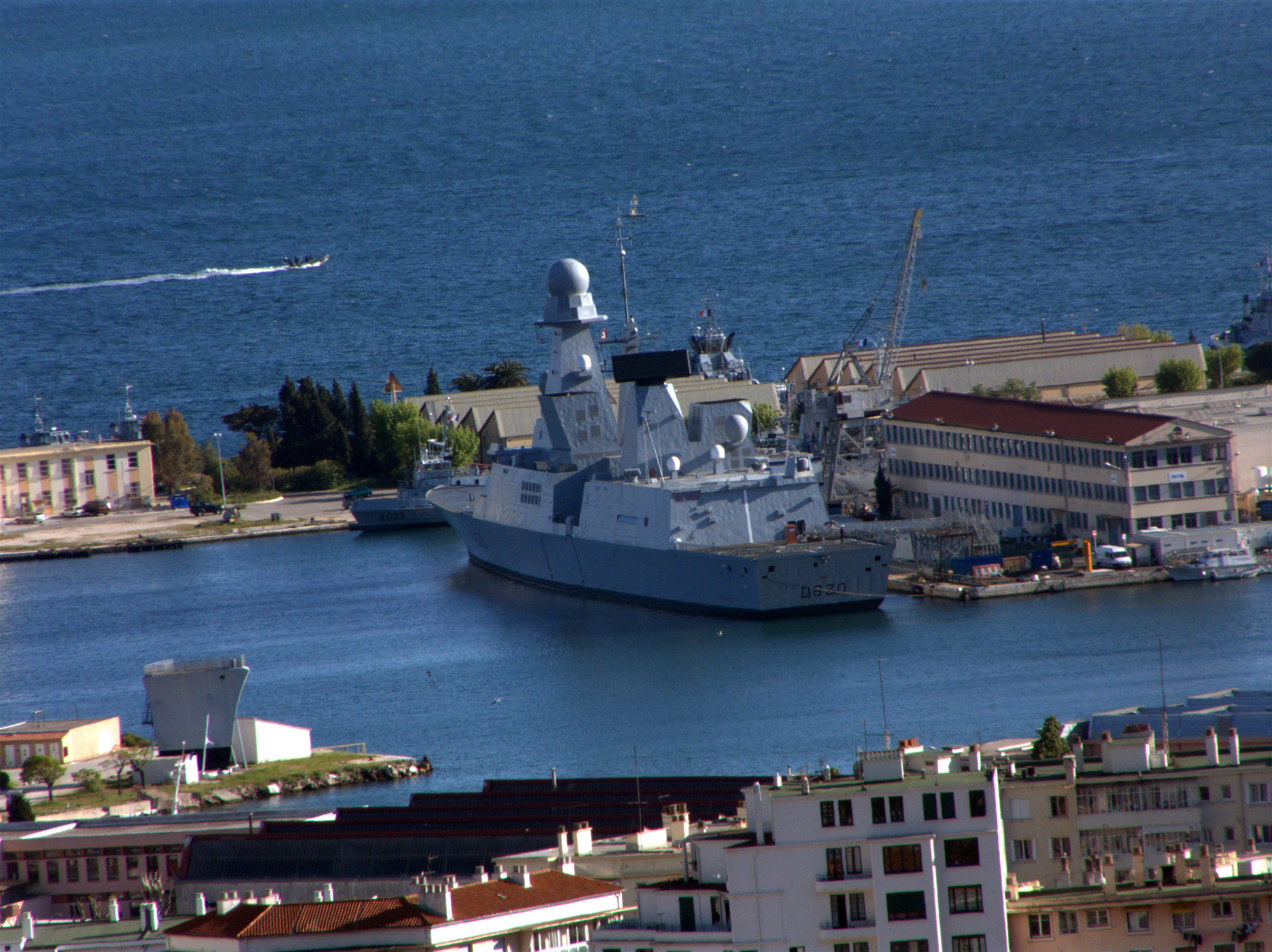
Forbin in Toulon on 29 April 2008

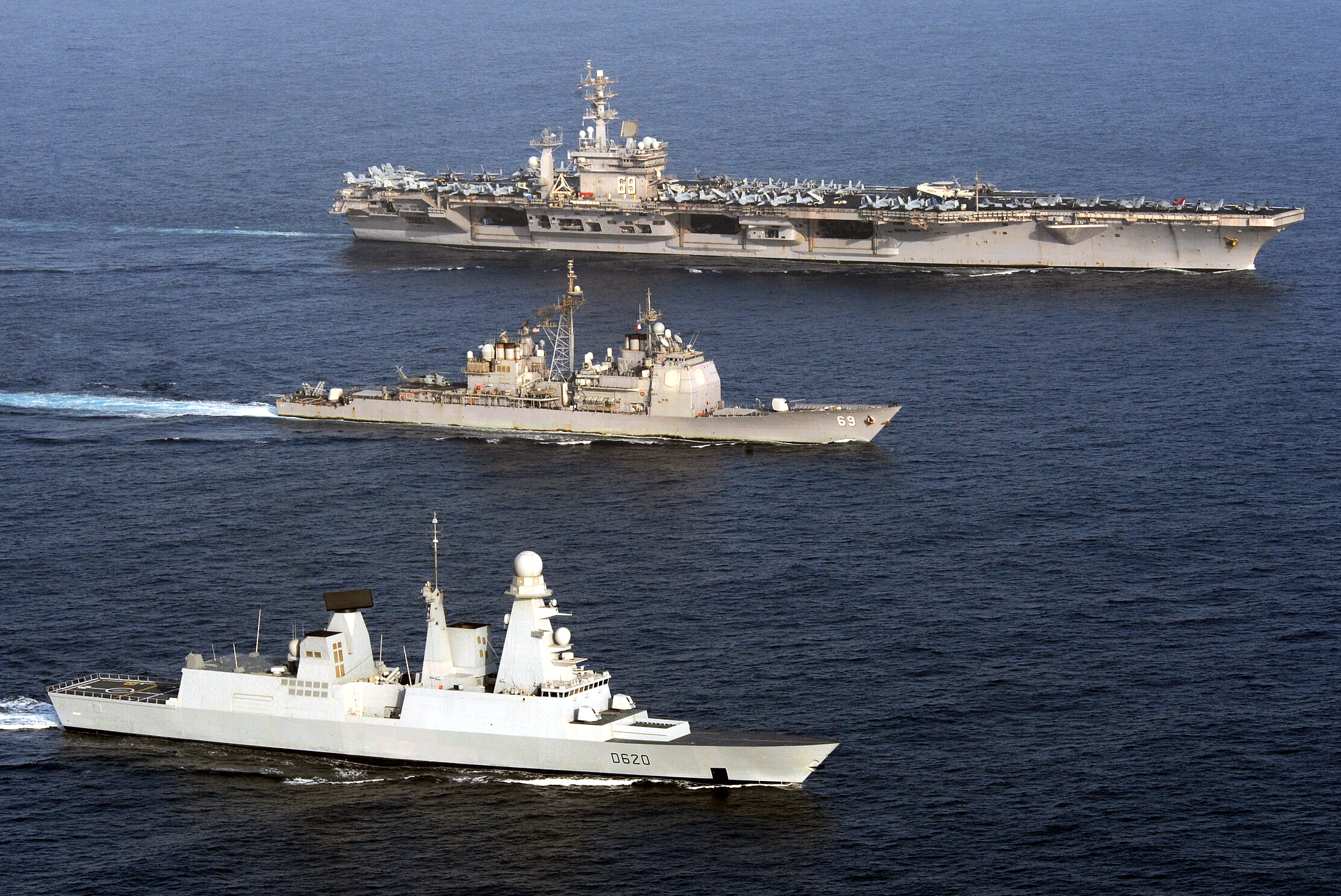
Forbin with the USS Eisenhower carrier group

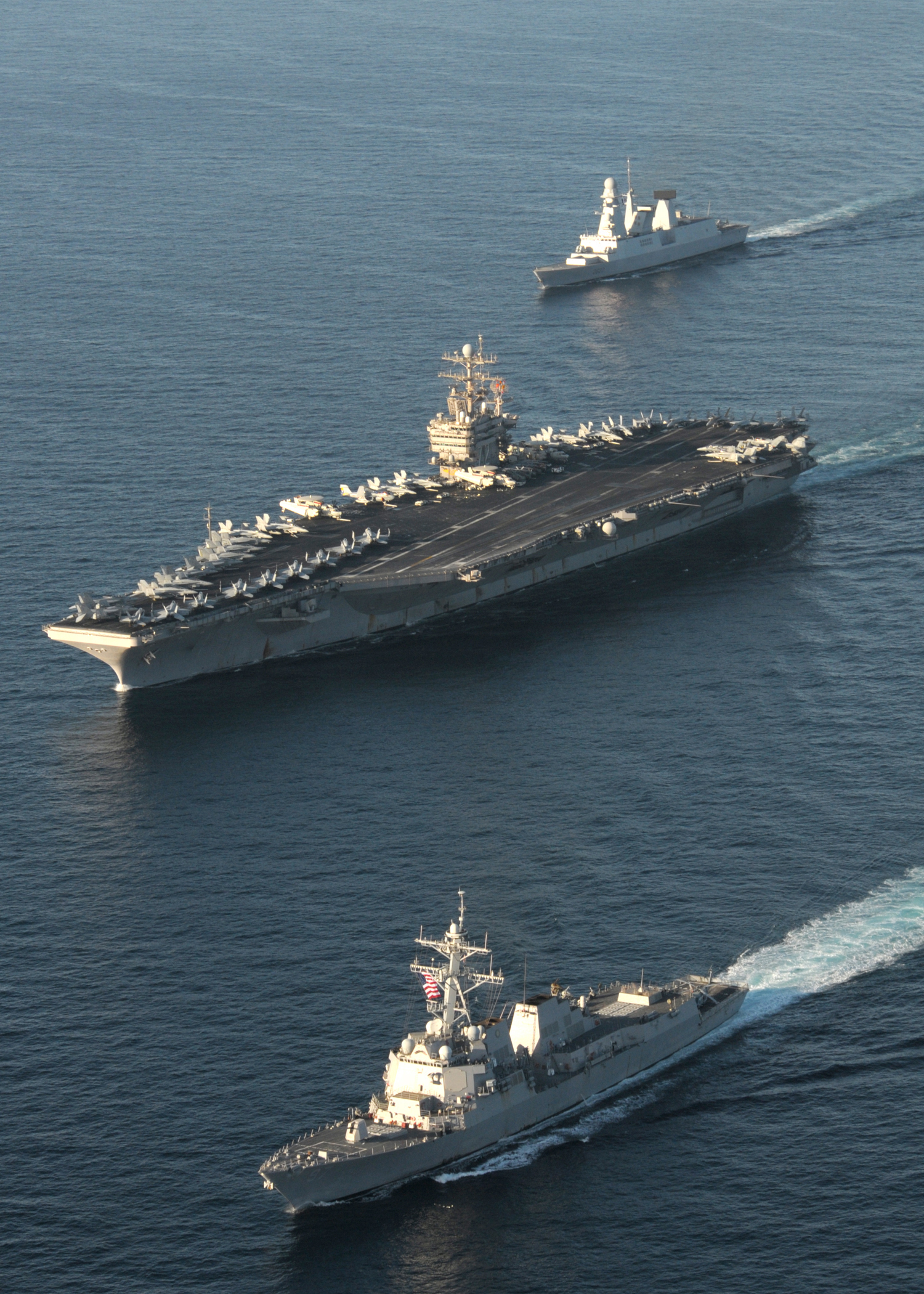
With USS Abraham Lincoln

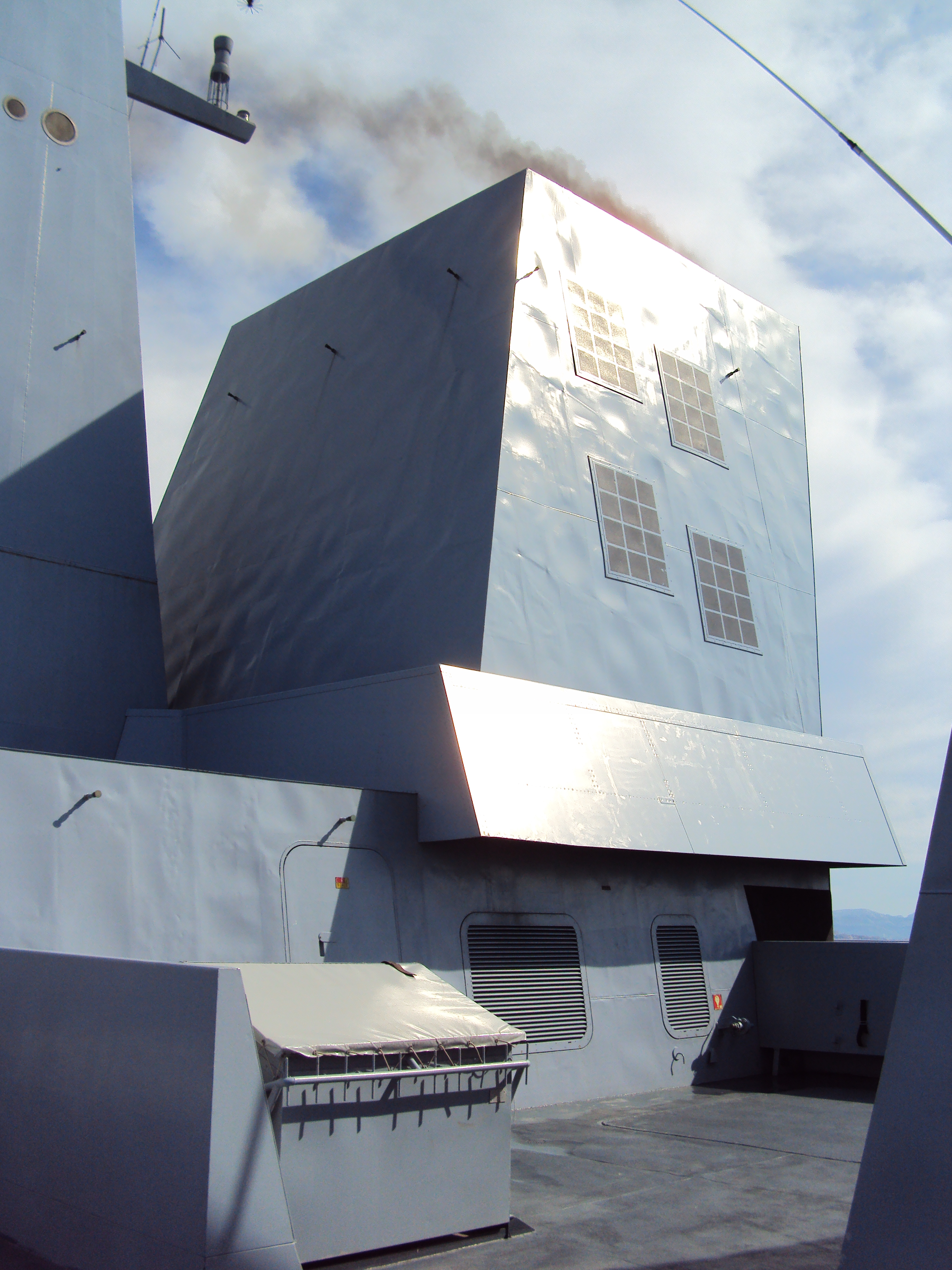
Detail of Forbin. The faceted appearance reduces radar cross-section for stealth.

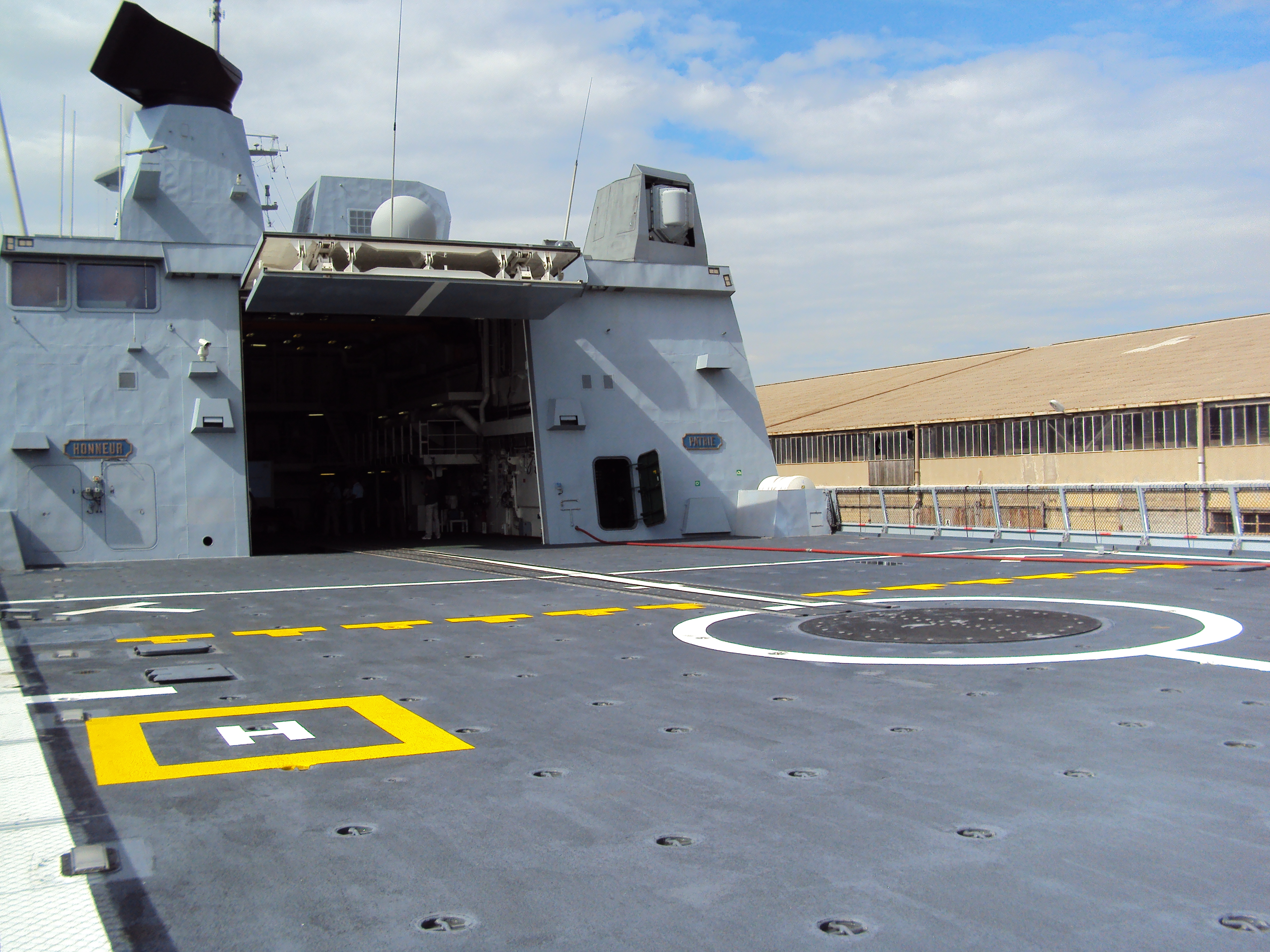
Flight deck

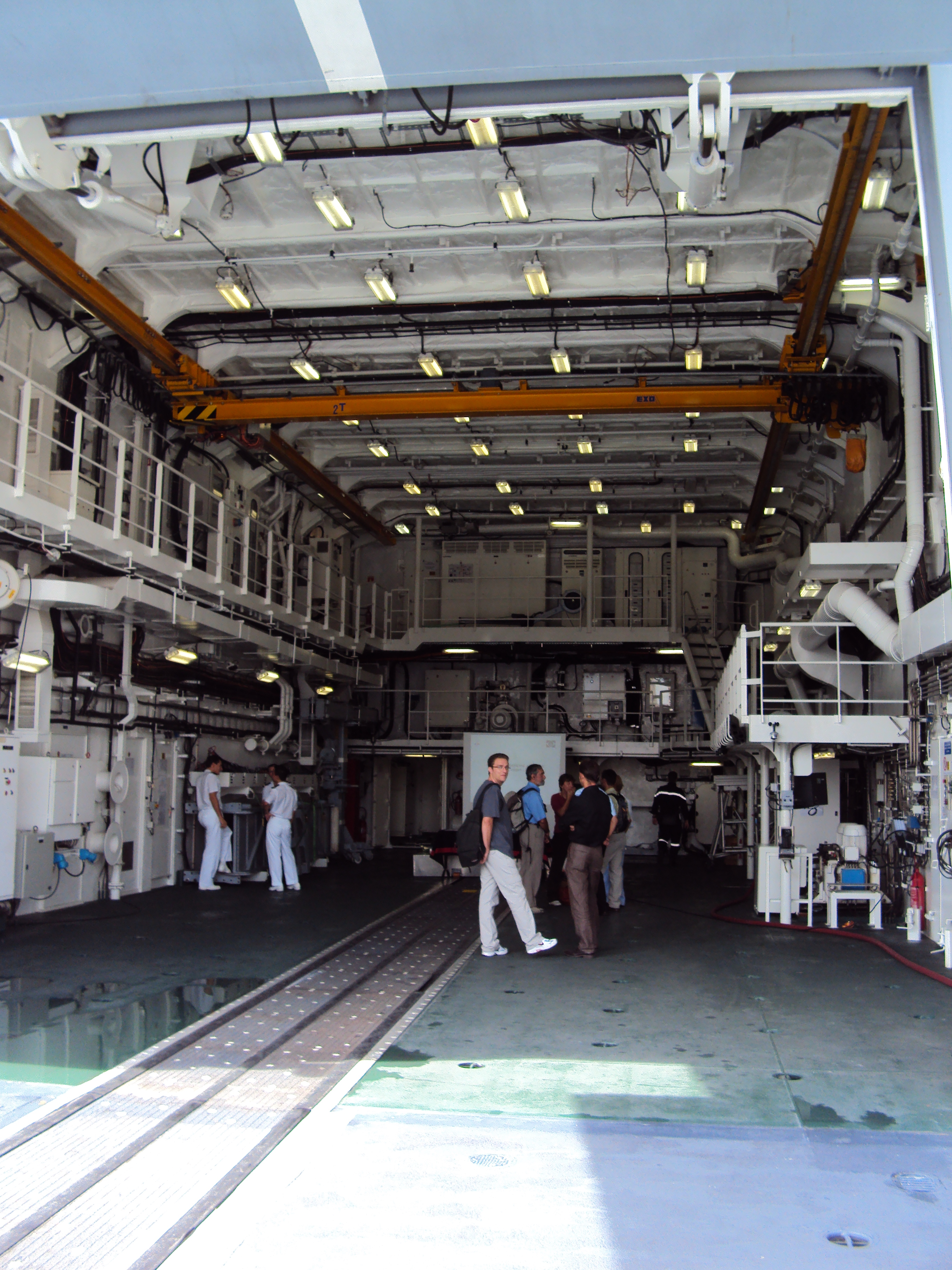
Flight hangar

== See also ==
- List of ship launches in 2005
