= Horizon-class frigate =

Class of air-defence destroyers

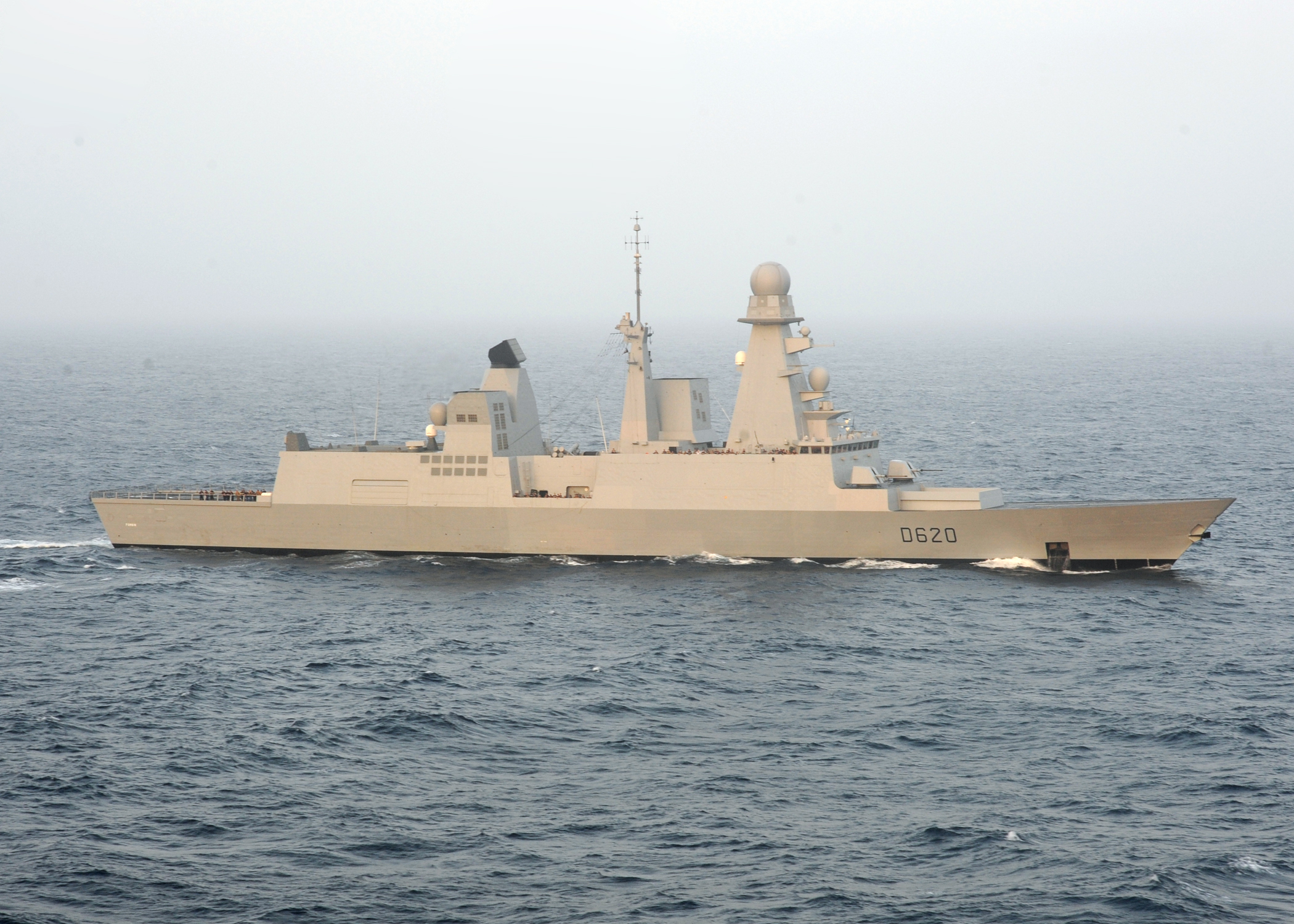
- French destroyer Forbin, lead ship of the Horizon class

Class overview
- Name: Horizon class
- Builders: Horizon Sas (DCNS, Thales, Fincantieri, Finmeccanica – Leonardo-Finmeccanica since 2016), Leonardo since 2017
- Operators: French Navy; Italian Navy
- Preceded by: Suffren class (France); Durand de la Penne class (Italy)
- Succeeded by: DDX class (Italy)
- Cost: France: €1.08 billion per unit (FY 2013); Italy: €1.5 billion per unit (FY 2016)
- Built: 2002–2009
- In service: 2008–present
- In commission: 2007–present
- Planned: 8
- Completed: 4
- Cancelled: 4
- Active: 4

General characteristics
- Type: Destroyer
- Displacement: 7,050 t (6,940 long tons; 7,770 short tons), full load; 5,290 t (5,210 long tons; 5,830 short tons), light displacement
- Length: 152.87 m (501 ft 7 in) LOA; 141.7 m (465 ft) LPP
- Beam: 20.3 m (67 ft)
- Draught: 5.4 m (18 ft); depth 11.8 m (39 ft)
- Propulsion: CODOG scheme; 2 × GE/Avio General Electric LM2500Plus TAG, 20.500 kW (27.491 hp) each; 2 × diesel engines SEMT Pielstick 12PA6 STC 4.320 kW (5.793 hp) each; 4 × diesel engine generators Isotta Fraschini V1716T2ME, 1.600 kW (2.146 hp) each; 2 × shaft; 1 × bow thruster
- Speed: In excess of 29 knots (54 km/h; 33 mph)
- Range: 6,100 nautical miles (11,000 km) at 18 kn (33 km/h); 3,500 nmi (6,480 km) at 25 knots (46 km/h)
- Complement: Italy: 255 in 1, 2 or 4 berth cabins
- Crew: Italy: 236, of which: 195 based-crew + 13 flight staff + 18 others
- Sensors & processing systems: Selex ES EMPAR Phased array G band multi-purpose radar; BAE/Thales Group S1850M long range radar; Thales Group UMS 4110 CL sonar; (Only Italian units:) surface search radar in E/F band Selex RAN 30X/I (RASS); Selex ES IFF SIR R/S; GEM Elettronica navigation radar AN/SPN753(V)4; 2 × Selex ES RTN-30X fire direction radar; Sagem IRST Vampir MB (IRAS)
- Electronic warfare & decoys: Elettronica Spa 4100 Nettuno; SIGEN EW; 2 × OTO Melara ODLS-H decoy launching system; 2 × SLAT anti torpedo system
- Armament: Anti-air missiles: PAAMS air-defence system.; A 48-cell A50 Sylver Vertical Launching System for a mix of up-to 48×: Aster 15 missiles (range 1.7–30 km); Aster 30 missiles (range 3–120 km); Anti-ship missiles: 8 × Exocet MM40 Block 3 (France); 8 × TESEO Mk-2/A (Italy); Guns & CIWS: 2 × OTO Melara 76 mm Super Rapid guns (France); 3 × OTO Melara 76 mm Super Rapid guns with Davide/Strales system (Italy); (as of 2025) 2 × 2 Sadral Mistral Simbad-RC CIWS to be fit to both French vessels in due course; 2 × OTO Melara 25/80 gun with Oerlikon KBA 25mm (Italy) or, 3 × 20 mm Narwhal remotely-operated guns (France); Italy: 2 × LRAD Sitep MS-424; Anti-submarine warfare: 2 × WASS B515/1 single torpedo tubes for MU90 Impact (with 24 torpedoes stored)
- Aircraft carried: 1 × AW101 or SH90A
- Aviation facilities: Flight deck, 24.8 m × 16.0 m (81.4 ft × 52.5 ft); Hangar for one AW101 or NH90 Caïman

The Horizon class (French: Classe Horizon; Italian: Classe Orizzonte) is a class of air-defence destroyers in service with the French and Italian navies. They are designated as destroyers by the Italians and are referred to as "frigates" by the French but nonetheless also use the NATO classification "D" intended for destroyers. The programme started as the Common New Generation Frigate (CNGF), a three-nation collaboration between France, the United Kingdom, and Italy to develop a new generation of air-defence warships. Differing national requirements, workshare disagreements and delays led to the UK withdrawing from the project in 1999 to develop the Type 45 destroyer.

The FREMM multipurpose frigate were built using the same company structure as the Horizon project.

== Development ==
France, Italy, and the UK issued a joint requirement in 1992 after the failure of the NATO Frigate Replacement for the 90s (NFR-90) project. In July 1993, the three countries signed a Memorandum of Understanding for a Common New Generation Frigate (CNGF). The ships were to be armed with the Principal Anti Air Missile System (PAAMS). The UK intended to purchase twelve ships to replace its Type 42 destroyers. France was to purchase four to replace its Suffren class, and Italy would purchase six to replace its Andrea Doria and Audace-class ships.

Problems emerged almost immediately. The primary problem was that of differing requirements: France wanted anti-aircraft warfare (AAW) escorts for its aircraft carriers, but only a limited range was necessary due to the self-defence capability of the French Charles de Gaulle. Italy too required only close-range capabilities, as in its home waters of the Mediterranean Sea the ships would operate under Italian Air Force cover or escorts for its aircraft carrier Cavour. The Royal Navy, however, required more capable ships which could throw a large defensive "bubble" over a fleet operating in hostile areas. The compromise that largely solved this problem was the adoption of a standard radar interface, which allowed France and Italy to install the EMPAR multi-function passive electronically scanned array radar and the UK to install the more capable SAMPSON active electronically scanned array radar—the SAMPSON radar has a higher data rate and an adaptive beam that allows a greater ability to track multiple targets, long-range detection of low-RCS targets, a lower false-alarm rate, and overall higher tracking accuracy.

In March 1996, it was agreed that the PAAMS office would be based in Paris, and the Project Horizon project office would be based in London. The latter was to be responsible for the design of the ship, its command and control, and secondary weapons systems. Britain also agreed to contribute £100m in recognition of the development work already completed by Italy and France on PAAMS. Construction would be carried out by DCN (France), GEC-Marconi (UK), and Orizzonte (Italy).

=== UK withdrawal ===
On 26 April 1999, the UK announced that it was withdrawing from the CNGF project to pursue its own national design. At this point, the CNGF project was five years behind schedule. The Financial Times summarised the main disagreements between the partner countries:

- Vessel size – As noted above, the UK's requirements were out of step with those of France and Italy. An agreement was reached but the Financial Times reported that the issue "never entirely [went] away."
- Capability – The UK wanted the ships with a wide-area defence capability due to its experience in the Falklands War.
- Industrial structure – The UK tried to use its larger requirement to exert influence; the UK's desire to see Marconi appointed as prime contractor was accepted by France, but only in return for DCN being given the role as prime contractor for the combat management system. The UK, which wished to see a British Aerospace-led consortium given this role, would not accept this.

The resulting Type 45 destroyer is armed with the PAAMS missile system and has benefited from investment in the Horizon project.

=== Franco-Italian project ===
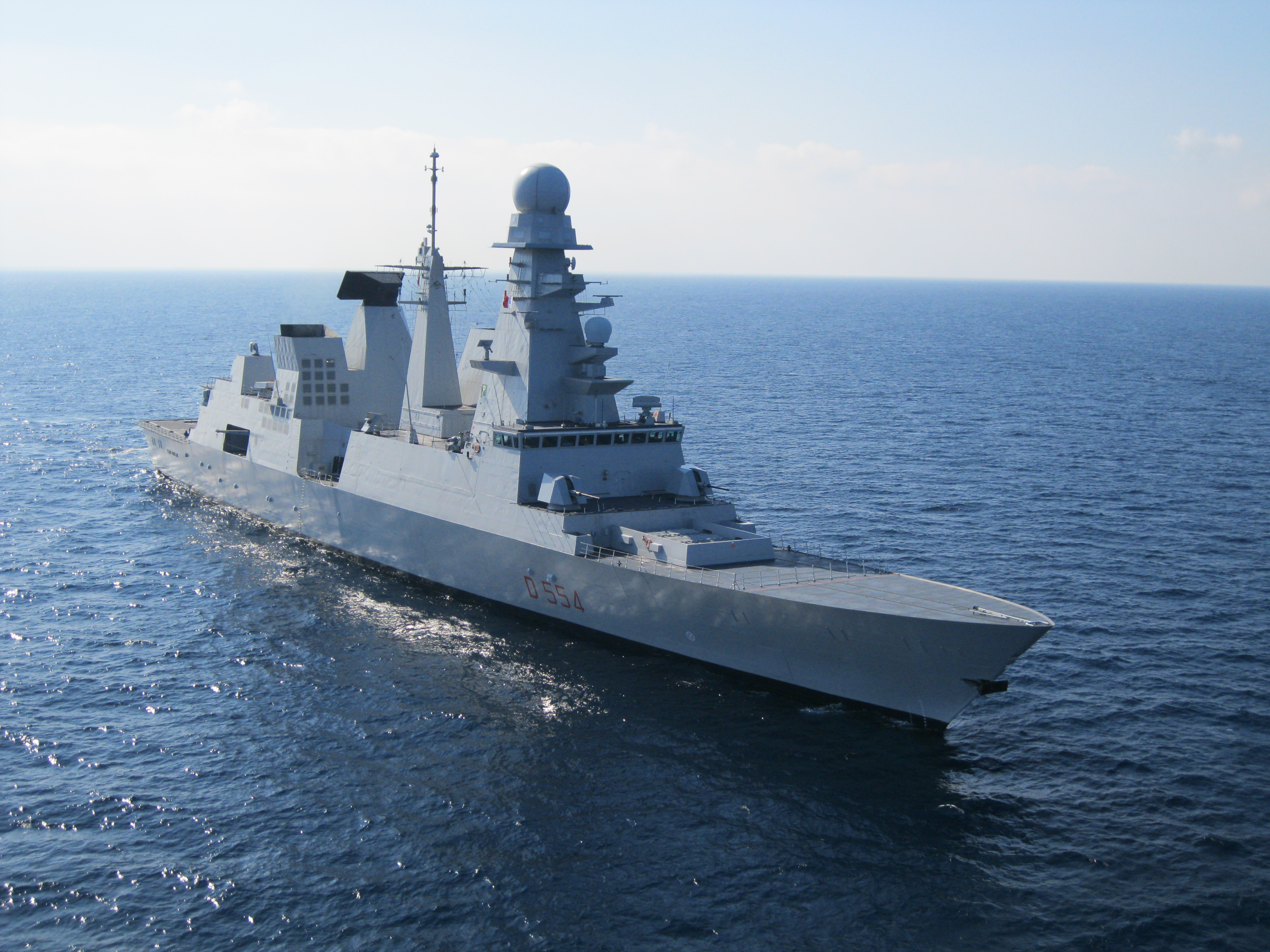
Italian Caio Duilio

France and Italy continued their collaboration under the Horizon project. In September 2000, the two countries signed a contract to jointly produce four ships, ordering two ships each which would deploy the PAAMS missile system. The Italian Navy ordered two units, Andrea Doria and Caio Duilio, to replace the Audace class. Andrea Doria was accepted on 22 December 2007 and received the flag of the Italian Navy. Full operation capability was achieved in the summer of 2008. The French Navy ordered two units, Forbin and Chevalier Paul, to replace the Suffren-class carrier escorts. The project cost France €2.16bn (~US$3bn) at 2009 prices. A further two Horizons were cancelled; instead, the two Cassard-class frigates were to be replaced by the FREDA air-defence variant of the Franco-Italian FREMM multipurpose frigate (later known as Alsace and Lorraine). France bought 40 Aster 15 and 80 Aster 30 missiles for their ships. On the Italian units, the three cannons will be upgraded to the 76 mm/62 Super Rapid Multi Feeding David/Strales version with the capacity to use the DART guided projectile in the anti-missile role.

== Ships ==
Name	Pennant number	Builder	Laid down	Launched	Commissioned	Status	Motto
French Navy
Forbin	D620	DCNS; Lorient	4 April 2002	10 March 2005	December 2008	In service	Opra Sac Di Sou Kraam
Chevalier Paul	D621	DCNS; Lorient	23 October 2003	12 July 2006	June 2009	In service	Oser et Vaincre
Italian Navy
Andrea Doria	D 553	Fincantieri; Riva Trigoso and Muggiano (La Spezia)	19 July 2002	15 October 2005	22 December 2007	In service	Altius Tendam
Caio Duilio	D 554	Fincantieri; Riva Trigoso and Muggiano (La Spezia)	19 September 2003	23 October 2007	3 April 2009	In service	Nomen numen

== See also ==
- Arleigh Burke-class destroyer
- Kolkata-class destroyer
- Atago-class destroyer
- Sejong the Great-class destroyer
- Type 052D destroyer
- Type 45 destroyer
