= EMPAR =

Shipborne multifunction PESA radar

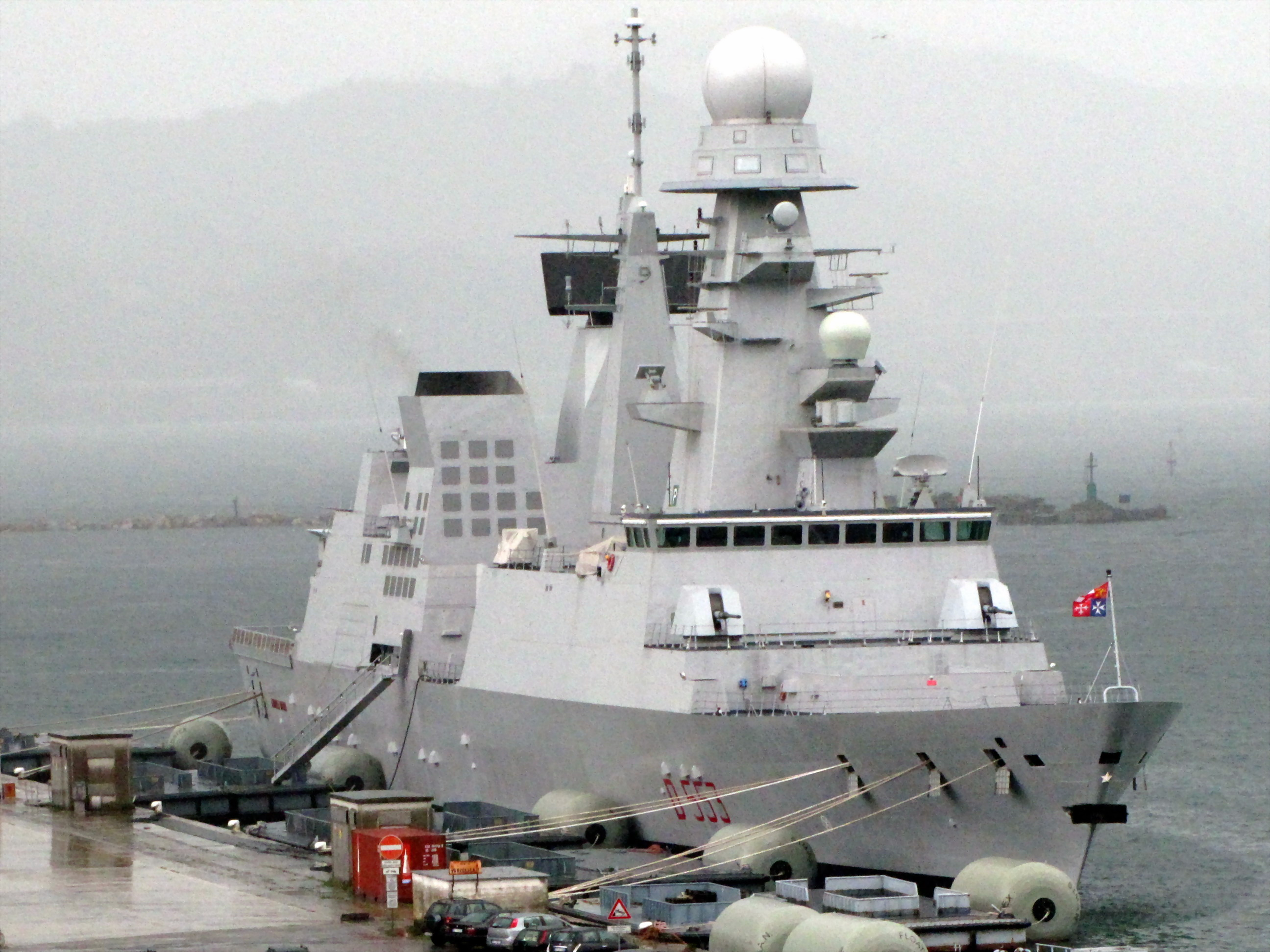
EMPAR radar on the Italian destroyer Andrea Doria

EMPAR (European Multifunction Phased Array Radar) is a rotating C band multifunction active electronically scanned array radar that reached IOC in 2006 and was initially built by Selex ES (previously SELEX Sistemi Integrati, since 2016 merged in Finmeccanica, then Leonardo S.p.A.). It is designed to be the principal radar system aboard naval vessels of medium and large sizes. The radar offers full volumetric search coverage, low altitude and surface search, the tracking of multiple targets, and the capability to uplink information for missile guidance.

== Details ==
EMPAR's principal function is 3D volumetric air search, providing a bearing, range and altitude for air traffic out to ranges of 300 miles (480 km). It is capable of tracking aircraft or smaller targets such as missiles. The system employs a single narrow beam for transmission, plus multiple beams for reception. These can be steered electronically, allowing the EMPAR to scan very rapidly across a wide angle of bearing and/or elevation. It thus provides the simultaneous monitoring of an entire hemisphere. The flat face of the radar is rotated at 60 rpm, allowing it to sweep across the whole sky very rapidly. The system therefore provides an almost continuous 360 degree view, in contrast to earlier rotating radar systems which often took ten seconds or more to sweep the sky. This capability is important to air defence systems given the great speed of modern anti ship missiles such as the P-270 Moskit or BrahMos.

EMPAR continuously analyses the data it receives and will automatically adapt the frequency and waveform it is using as necessary. As with all phased array radars it is difficult to jam or interfere with and can work in the presence of intense clutter. EMPAR is compatible with the PAAMS system, providing guidance to Aster 15 or 30 missiles for medium or long range air defence.

== Employment ==
Algeria - Algerian National Navy

- 1 x BDSL Kalaat Béni Abbès class

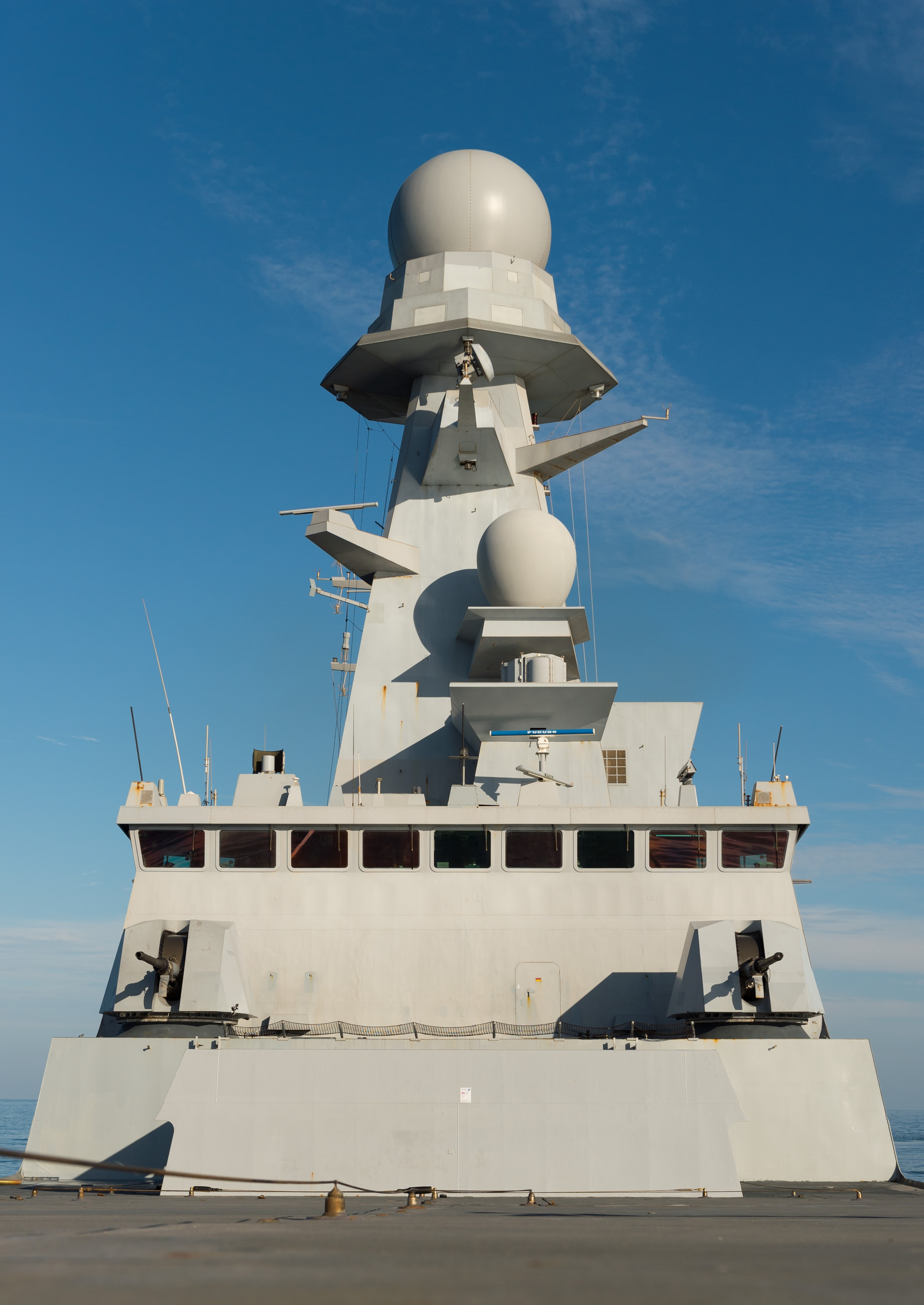
EMPAR on top of the mast of the French frigate Chevalier Paul, seen from the bow of the ship.

France - Marine Nationale

- 2 x Horizon-class destroyers

Italy - Italian Navy

- 1 x Cavour-class aircraft carrier
- 2 x Horizon-class destroyers
- 1 x Taranto training center

== Development ==
MFRA (Multi Functional Radar Active)

EMPAR (European Multifunction Phased Array Radar) is evolved to MFRA (Multi Functional Radar Active), an AESA rotating C band multifunction active electronically scanned array radar built by Selex ES.

MFRA is embarked on the Italian FREMM Frigate Bergamini class (10 units with 10 radar).
