= List of Liberty ships (D) =

This is a list of Liberty ships with names beginning with D.

== Description ==
The standard Liberty ship (EC-2-S-C1 type) was a cargo ship 441 feet 6 inches (134.57 m) long overall, with a beam of 56 feet 10 3/4 inches (17.34 m). It had a depth of 37 feet 4 inches (11.38 m) and a draft of 26 feet 10 inches (8.18 m). It was powered by a triple expansion steam engine, which had cylinders of 24 1/2 inches (62 cm), 37 inches (94 cm) and 70 inches (180 cm) diameter by 48 inches (120 cm) stroke. The engine produced 2,500ihp at 76rpm. Driving a four-blade propeller 18 feet 6 inches (5.64 m) in diameter, could propel the ship at 11 knots (20 km/h).

Cargo was carried in five holds, numbered 1–5 from bow to stern. Grain capacity was 84,183 cubic feet (2,383.8 m^{3}), 145,604 cubic feet (4,123.0 m^{3}), 96,429 cubic feet (2,730.6 m^{3}), 93,190 cubic feet (2,639 m^{3}) and 93,190 cubic feet (2,639 m^{3}), with a further 49,086 cubic feet (1,390.0 m^{3}) in the deep tanks. Bale capacity was 75,405 cubic feet (2,135.2 m^{3}), 134,638 cubic feet (3,812.5 m^{3}), 83,697 cubic feet (2,370.0 m^{3}), 82,263 cubic feet (2,329.4 m^{3}) and 82,435 cubic feet (2,334.3 m^{3}), with a further 41,135 cubic feet (1,164.8 m^{3}) in the deep tanks.

It carried a crew of 45, plus 36 United States Navy Armed Guard gunners. Later in the war, this was altered to a crew of 52, plus 29 gunners. Accommodation was in a three deck superstructure placed midships. The galley was equipped with a range, a 25 US gallons (95 L) stock kettle and other appliances. Messrooms were equipped with an electric hot plate and an electric toaster.

== Dan Beard ==
Dan Beard was built by Permanente Metals Corporation, Richmond, California. Her keel was laid on 15 January 1943. She was launched on 6 March and delivered on 17 March. Built for the War Shipping Administration (WSA), she was operated under the management of Stockard Steamship Co. Torpedoed and damaged in the Irish Sea off Strumble Head, United Kingdom by U-1202 on 10 December 1944 whilst on a voyage from Barry to Belfast, United Kingdom. She broke in two; the stern section sank, the bow section came ashore and was wrecked.

== Daniel Appleton ==
Daniel Appleton was built by Bethlehem Fairfield Shipyard, Baltimore, Maryland. Her keel was laid on 23 October 1943. She was launched as Daniel Appleton on 20 November and delivered as Samfield on 30 November. Built for the Ministry of War Transport (MoWT), she was operated under the management of Cayzer, Irvine & Co. Management transferred to W. Runciman & Co. in 1946. Sold in 1947 Moor Line and renamed Southmoor, remaining under the same management. Sold in 1950 to Marine Enterprises Ltd., London and renamed Marine Pride. Sold in 1951 to Maritima del Sur Compania Navigation, Panama and renamed St. Spero. Reflagged to Costa Rica and operated under the management of Lyras Bros. Sold in 1953 to Liciferis Compania Navigation, Panama and renamed Endeavour. Remaining under the Costa Rican flag and operated under the management of S. G. Embiricos. Sold in 1959 to Ocean Span Corp. and renamed Valiant Liberty. reflagged to Liberia and operated under the management of Ocean Carriers Corp. Sold in 1960 to Phoenix Steamship Corp and renamed Skyllas. Remaining under the Liberian flag and operated under the management of Cargo & Tankship Management Corp. Sold later that year to Taiwan Ming Sung Industrial Co., Keelung, Taiwan. Renamed Hwei Sung and reflagged to China. Ran aground at Naoyetsu, Japan on 30 October 1961. Refloated on 7 November but declared a constructive total loss. Scrapped at Osaka, Japan in February 1962.

== Daniel Boone ==
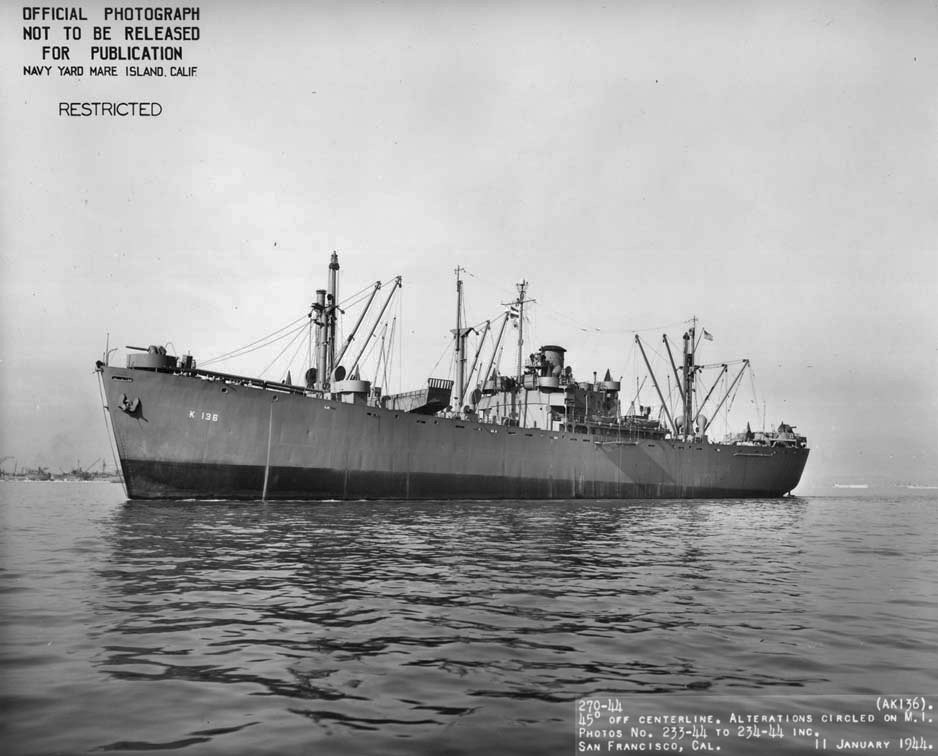
USS Ara

Daniel Boone was built by California Shipbuilding Corporation, Terminal Island, Los Angeles, California. Her keel was laid on 17 July 1941. She was launched on 14 January 1942 and delivered on 17 April. To the United States Navy in December 1943 as Ara. Returned to WSA in October 1945. Renamed Daniel Boone and laid up in the James River. Scrapped at Bilbao, Spain in April 1972.

== Daniel Carroll ==
Daniel Carroll was built by Todd Houston Shipbuilding Corporation, Houston, Texas. Her keel was laid on 24 April 1942. She was launched on 11 July and delivered on 11 August. Built for the WSA, she was operated under the management of J. H. Winchester & Co. She was scrapped at Philadelphia, Pennsylvania in March 1960.

== Daniel Chester French ==
Daniel Chester French was built by Bethlehem Fairfield Shipyard. Her keel was laid on 12 October 1942. She was launched on 12 November and delivered on 30 November. Built for the WSA, she was operated under the management of Stockland Steamship Co. Struck a mine 30 nautical miles (56 km) off Bizerta, Tunisia (37°17′N 10°22′E) on 6 March 1944 whilst on a voyage from Philadelphia to Bandar Shapur, Iran. Her cargo caught fire and exploded, sinking her.

== Daniel Drake ==
Daniel Drake was built by California Shipbuilding Corporation. Her keel was laid on 21 January 1943. She was launched on 18 February and delivered on 7 March. She was scrapped at Portland, Maine in December 1959.

== Daniel E. Garrett ==
Daniel E. Garrett was built by Todd Houston Shipbuilding Corporation. Her keel was laid on 14 February 1944. She was launched on 22 March and delivered on 5 April. To the United States Army as Major General Robert Olds, an aircraft repair ship. Returned to WSA in 1946 and renamed Daniel E. Garrett. Scrapped at Baltimore in April 1960.

== Daniel G. Reid ==
Daniel G. Reid was built by Permanente Metals Corporation. Her keel was laid on 13 January 1944. She was launched on 1 February and delivered on 9 February. Laid up at Mobile, Alabama post-war, she was scrapped at Panama City, Florida in September 1971.

== Daniel H. Hill ==
Daniel H. Hill was built by North Carolina Shipbuilding Company, Wilmington, North Carolina. Her keel was laid on 27 November 1942. She was launched on 27 December and delivered on 10 January 1943. She was scrapped at Richmond in 1964.

== Daniel Hiester ==
Daniel Hiester was built by Todd Houston Shipbuilding Corporation. Her keel was laid on 9 June 1942. She was launched on 22 August and delivered on 15 September. Laid up in the James River post-war, she was scrapped in Spain in April 1972.

== Daniel H. Lownsdale ==
Daniel H. Lownsdale was built by Oregon Shipbuilding Corporation, Portland, Oregon. Her keel was laid on 27 June 1942. She was launched on 5 August and delivered on 17 August. She was scrapped at Kearny, New Jersey in August 1970.

== Daniel Huger ==
Daniel Huger was built by Delta Shipbuilding Company, New Orleans, Louisiana. Her keel was laid on 17 May 1942. She was launched on 9 August and delivered on 12 September. Built for the WSA, she was operated under the management of Mississippi Shipping Co. Bombed at Bône, Algeria in May 1943 and set afire. Temporary repairs were made enabling her to return to the United States for permanent repairs. Laid up at Mobile post-war, she was scuttled off the coast of Alabama in 1974.

== Daniel L. Johnston ==
Daniel L. Johnston was built by Todd Houston Shipbuilding Company. Her keel was laid on 4 December 1944. She was launched on 10 January 1945 and delivered on 20 January. She was scrapped at Panama City, Florida in February 1963.

== Daniel Morgan ==
Daniel Morgan was built by North Carolina Shipbuilding Company. Her keel was laid on 3 September 1941. She was launched on 8 March 1942 and delivered on 16 April. Built for the WSA, she was operated under the management of American South African Line. Severely damaged by Luftwaffe aircraft off Novaya Zemlya, Soviet Union on 5 July 1942 whilst on a voyage from Reykjavík, Iceland to a port in the north of the Soviet Union. Abandoned by her crew, she was subsequently torpedoed and sunk (75°08′N 45°06′E) by U-88.

== Daniel S. Lamont ==
Daniel S. Lamont was built by Oregon Shipbuilding Corporation. Her keel was laid on 13 December 1942. She was launched on 7 January 1943 and delivered on 14 January. She was scrapped at Mobile in October 1966.

== Daniel Webster ==
Daniel Webster was built by New England Shipbuilding Corporation, South Portland, Maine. Her keel was laid on 1 November 1942. She was launched on 28 January 1943 and delivered on 10 February. Built for the WSA, she was operated under the management of Sprague Steamship Co. Torpedoed by aircraft and damaged off Oran, Algeria on 10 January 1944 whilst on a voyage from the Hampton Roads, Virginia to Naples, Italy. She was towed in to Oran and beached. Declared a constructive total loss, she was scrapped at Cartagena, Spain in September 1948.

== Daniel Willard ==
Daniel Willard, probably in Belgium

Daniel Willard was built by Bethlehem Fairfield Shipyard. Her keel was laid on 26 October 1942. She was launched on 25 November and delivered on 8 December. Laid up in the Hudson River post-war, she was sold to shipbreakers in Karachi, Pakistan in December 1970. Resold, she was scrapped at Valencia, Spain in July 1971.

== Darel M. Rutter ==
Darel M. Rutter was built by Delta Shipbuilding Company. Her keel as laid on 26 December 1944. She was launched on 5 February 1945 and delivered on 22 February. Built for the WSA, she was operated under the management of American Export Lines. Management transferred to Boland & Cornelius in 1946. Laid up at Astoria, Oregon in 1948. Sold in 1951 to Universal Cargo Carriers Corp. and renamed Seamanor. Operated under the management of Orion Shipping and Trading Co. Sold in 1953 to Cerrodorado Compania Navigation, Panama and renamed Pitrofos, remaining under the same management. Sold in 1954 to Incaica Compania Armamente, Panama and renamed Faralis. Operated under the management of Goulandris Ltd. Sold in 1959 to Dolores Shipping Corp. Reflagged to Liberia and operated under the management of Suwannee Steamship Co. Scrapped at Keelung in March 1968.

== Daulton Mann ==
Daulton Mann was built by Permanente Metals Corporation. Her keel was laid on 23 December 1943. She was launched on 19 January 1944 and delivered on 29 February. Built for the WSA, she was operated under the management of Grace Line. Sold in 1947 to Scindia Steam Navigation Co., Bombay, India and renamed Jalaketu. Scrapped at Bombay in August 1964.

== David A. Curry ==
David A. Curry was built by California Shipbuilding Corporation. Her keel was laid on 5 January 1944. She was launched on 31 January and delivered on 17 February. Built for the WSA, she was operated under the management of South Atlantic Steamship Line. To French Government in 1946. Sold in 1947 to Société Navigation Caennaise, Caen, France and renamed Vire. Sold in 1963 to Compagnie San Giovanni, Panama and renamed Appolonian. Operated under the management of Wigham Richardson & Co. Sold in 1967 to Limnia Shipping Co., Cyprus. Scrapped at Shanghai, China in September 1969.

== David Belasco ==
David Belasco was built by Permanente Metals Corporation. Her keel was laid on 31 July 1943. She was launched on 26 August and delivered on 5 September. She was scrapped at Portland, Oregon in April 1966.

== David B. Henderson ==
David B. Henderson was built by Oregon Shipbuilding Corporation. Her keel was laid on 5 September 1943. She was launched on 20 September and delivered on 27 September. She was scrapped at Oakland, California in 1962.

== David B. Johnson ==
David B. Johnson was built by J. A. Jones Construction Co., Brunswick, Georgia. Her keel was laid on 23 November 1943. She was launched on 13 January 1944 and delivered on 24 January. Built for the WSA, she was operated under the management of Wilmore Steamship Co. She was scrapped at Oakland in February 1968.

== David Bushnell ==
David Bushnell was built by Permanente Metals Corporation. Her keel was laid on 31 July 1942. She was launched on 15 September and delivered on 28 September. Built for the WSA, she was operated under the management of Luckenbach Steamship Co., Inc. Sold in 1951 to North American Shipping & Trading Co., New York and renamed Mojave. Sold in 1956 to Compania Ulysses, Panama and renamed Ulysses II. Reflagged to Liberia and operated under the management of Trans-Ocean Steamship Agency. Lengthened at Kobe, Japan in 1957 to 511 feet 6 inches (155.91 m). Now assessed at 8,608 GRT. Sold in 1962 to Ulysses Compania Maritima and renamed Ulysses. Reflagged to Greece. Sold in 1965 to Astra Carriers Corp., Lugano, Switzerland and renamed Narcea. Reflagged to Liberia. Scrapped at Faslane, United Kingdom in March 1971.

== David Caldwell ==
David Caldwell was built by North Carolina Shipbuilding Corporation. Her keel was laid on 22 March 1943. She was launched on 19 April and delivered on 26 April. She ran aground 5 nautical miles (9.3 km) off the La Coubre Lighthouse, France on 4 September 1946 whilst on a voyage from the Hampton Roads to Pauillac, France. She broke in three and was a total loss.

== David Davis ==
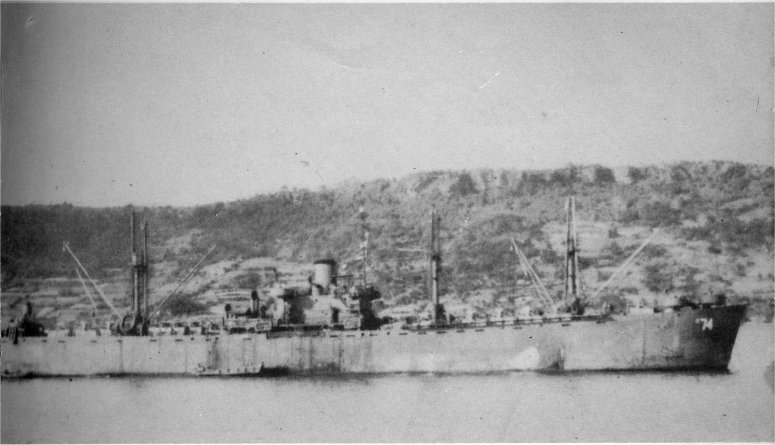
USS Carina after the suicide attack.

David Davis was built by Permanente Metals Corporation. Her keel was laid on 30 September 1942. He was launched as David Davis on 6 November and delivered to the United States Navy as Carina on 20 November. Rammed by a Japanese PT boat on a suicide mission at Okinawa, Japan on 4 May 1945 and was severely damaged. Returned to WSA post-war and laid up in Suisun Bay. Scrapped at Terminal Island in December 1952.

== David De Vries ==
David De Vries was built by Bethlehem Fairfield Shipyard. Her keel was laid on 12 July 1943. She was launched as David De Vries on 9 August and delivered as Samwater on 16 August. To MoWT under Lend-Lease, operated under the management of Glen Line Ltd. Caught fire 35 nautical miles (65 km) west of Cape Finisterre, Spain on 29 January 1942 whilst on a voyage from Sydney, Australia to Liverpool, United Kingdom. She was abandoned by her crew and sank in the Atlantic Ocean. (42°41′N 10°13′W).

== David Douglas ==
David Douglas was built by Oregon Shipbuilding Corporation. Her keel was laid on 24 June 1943. She was launched as David Douglas on 14 July and delivered as Baku on 22 July. To the Soviet Union under Lend-Lease. Scrapped at Vladivostok, Soviet Union in November 1977.

== David Dudley Field ==
David Dudley Field was built by Permanente Metals Corporation. Her keel was laid on 1 February 1943. She was launched on 24 March and delivered on 5 April. built for the WSA, she was operated under the management of Ishmian Steamship Corp. She was scrapped at Portland, Oregon in February 1970.

== David E. Hughes ==
David E. Hughes was built by California Shipbuilding Corporation. Her keel was laid on 10 May 1943. She was launched on 31 May and delivered on 15 June. Laid up in the Hudson River post-war, she was scuttled with a cargo of obsolete ammunition 120 nautical miles (220 km) south east of Sandy Hook, New Jersey (38°52′N 72°24′W) on 20 August 1970.

== David F. Barry ==
David F. Barry was built by Oregon Shipbuilding Corporation. Her keel was laid on 1 August 1943. She was launched on 21 August and delivered on 28 August. Built for the WSA, she was operated under the management of Alaska Transportation Co. Sold in 1947 to A/S Marly, Oslo, Norway and renamed Oakland. Operated under the management of Paul Bilch. Sold in 1949 to Skibs A/S Vaholm, Kristiansand, Norway. Operated under the management of Holmen & Vaboen. Sold in 1959 to Bienvenido Steamship Co. Ltd., Monrovia, Liberia and renamed Arta. Operated under the management of J. Livanos & Sons. Sold to the Polish Government in 1959. Renamed Kopalnia Bobrek. Operated under the management of Polska Żegluga Morska, Szczecin. Sold to her managers in 1971. Scrapped at Bilbao in March 1972.

== David F. Houston ==
David F. Houston was built by North Carolina Shipbuilding Company. Her keel was laid on 9 June 1943. She was launched on 8 July and delivered on 15 July. She was scrapped at Mobile in July 1969.

== David Gaillard ==
David Gaillard was built by Permanente Metals Corporation. Her keel was laid on 5 November 1942. She was launched on 14 December and delivered on 26 December. Laid up at Beaumont, Texas post-war, she was scrapped at Brownsville, Texas in October 1971.

== David G. Burnet ==
David G. Burnet was built by Todd Houston Shipbuilding Corporation. Her keel was laid on 6 March 1943. She was launched on 17 April and delivered on 8 May. She was scrapped at New Orleans in May 1964.

== David G. Farragut ==
David G. Farragut was built by Delta Shipbuilding Company. Her keel was laid on 7 November 1942. She was launched on 23 December and delivered on 11 January 1943. Laid up in the James River post-war, she was scrapped at Bilbao in June 1971.

== David Hewes ==
David Hewes was built by Permanente Metals Corporation. Her keel was laid on 8 October 1943. She was launched on 27 October and delivered on 5 November. Built for the WSA, she was operated under the management of American South African Line. Sold in 1947 to Società per Azioni Giuseppi Ravano, Genoa and renamed Punta Alice. Sold in 1964 to Oceanica Transports Co., Malta and renamed Ispahan. Reflagged to the United Kingdom and operated under the management of Union Maritime & Shipping Co. Sold in 1969 to John N. Vassilous and reflagged to Greece. Scrapped at Gandia, Spain in December 1969.

== David Holmes ==
David Holmes was a tanker built by Delta Shipbuilding Company. Her keel was laid on 17 June 1943. She was launched on 14 August and delivered on 16 October. Built for the WSA, she was operated under the management of Bernuth-Lembcke Company. Laid up post-war, she was sold in 1951 to Paco Tankers Inc. Operated under the management of Keystone Shipping Co. Sold in 1955 to San Raphael Compania Navigation, Panama and renamed Alpheus. Reflagged to Liberia. Converted to a cargo ship at Amsterdam, Netherlands. Operated under the management of Orion Shipping & Trading Co. Lengthened at Kure, Japan in 1956. Now 511 feet 6 inches (155.91 m) long and assessed at 8,588 GRT. Renamed Andros Stream, a bulk ore carrier. Sold in 1960 to Commerce Marine Corp. and renamed Patraikos. Reflagged to Greece, remaining under the same management. Sold in 1962 to Esperia Shipping Corp. and renamed Tilemachos. Operated under the management of Dracoulis Ltd. Sold in 1963 to Pacific Transport Corp. and renamed Argolikos. Operated under the management of Capeside Steamship Co. Renamed Tilemachos later that year. Renamed Argolikos in 1964 and reflagged to Liberia. Scrapped at Mukaijima, Japan in August 1967.

== David J. Brewer ==
David J. Brewer was built by Permanente Metals Corporation. Her keel was laid on 24 October 1942. She was launched on 26 November and delivered on 5 December. She was scrapped at Oakland in August 1962.

== David L. Swain ==
David L. Swain was built by North Carolina Shipbuilding Company. Her keel was laid on 6 February 1943. She was launched on 9 March and delivered on 16 March. Built for the WSA, she was operated under the management of Moore-McCormack Lines. Sold in 1946 to Lauro & Montella, Naples and renamed Sibilla. Sold in 1960 to Compania Balneira Italiana. Operated under the management of Fratelli d'Amico. Sold in 1963 to Compania Navigation Continental, Panama and renamed Sybil. Operated under the management of Ocean Shipping & Trading Corp. Scrapped at Tsuneishi, Japan in December 1968.

== David Lubin ==
David Lubin was built by Permanente Metals Corporation. Her keel was laid on 28 November 1943. She was launched on 16 December and delivered on 23 December. Built for the WSA, she was operated under the management of Wilmore Steamship Co. Sold in 1946 to Uruguaya de Navigacion y Transportes Aeroes, Montivedeo, Uruguay and renamed Floresta. Sold in 1949 to Angelo Scinicarello, Naples and renamed Luigi. Scrapped at Vado Ligure in February 1963.

== David L. Yulee ==
David L. Yulee was built by St. Johns River Shipbuilding Company, Jacksonville, Florida. Her keel was laid on 11 September 1944. She was launched on 16 October and delivered on 26 October. Laid up in the Hudson River post-war, she was scrapped at Bilbao in May 1971.

== David R. Francis ==
David R. Francis was built by California Shipbuilding Corporation. Her keel was laid on 19 July 1943. She was launched on 11 August and delivered on 24 August. She was scrapped at Baltimore in May 1960.

== David Rittenhouse ==
David Rittenhouse was a tanker built by California Shipbuilding Corporation. She was completed in November 1943. To United States Navy as Beagle. Returned to WSA in June 1946 and renamed David Rittenhouse. Sold in 1948 to Edison Tanker Co., New York and renamed Edison Skipper. Sold in 1955 to Geotas Compania de Vapores, Panama. Converted to a cargo ship at Baltimore and renamed George S. Reflagged to Liberia and operated under the management of Edison Steamship Co. Renamed Georgios Sideratos in 1960 and reflagged to Greece. Sold in 1964 to Compania de Navigation Annitsa, Panama and renamed Maria G. L. Reflagged to Liberia and operated under the management of Ceres Shipping Co. Scrapped at Hirao, Japan in March 1969.

== David Starr Jordan ==
David Starr Jordan was built by Permanente Metals Corporation. Her keel was laid on 7 February 1943. She was launched on 25 March and delivered on 7 April. Laid up at Mobile post-war, she was scrapped at Panama City, Florida in February 1971.

== David S. Terry ==
David S. Terry was built by Todd Houston Shipbuilding Corporation. Her keel was laid on 23 October 1941. She was launched on 29 May 1942 and delivered on 16 July. Laid up in the Hudson River post-war, she was scrapped at Bilbao in March 1971.

== David Stone ==
David Stone was built by North Carolina Shipbuilding Company. Her keel was laid on 16 August 1942. She was launched on 10 October and delivered on 21 October. She was scrapped at Portland, Oregon in August 1966.

== David Thompson ==
David Thompson was built by Oregon Shipbuilding Corporation. Her keel was laid on 27 July 1943. She was launched on 15 August and delivered on 23 August. She was scrapped at Everett, Washington in April 1961.

== David Wilmot ==
David Wilmot was built by Todd Houston Shipbuilding Corporation. Her keel was laid on 13 July 1943. She was launched on 26 August and delivered on 14 September. Built for the WSA, she was operated under the management of United States Navigation Co. Management transferred to Dichmann, Wright & Pugh in 1946. To the Dutch Government in 1947 and renamed Anthony Leeuwenhoek. Sold in 1948 to Vereenigde Nederlandsche Scheepvaarts Maatschappij NV., and renamed Laurenskerk. Sold in 1950 to Van Nievelt, Goudriaan & Co.'s Stoomvaart Maatschappij, Rotterdam. Sold in 1951 to Vereenigde Nederlandsche Scheepvaarts Maatschappij NV. Sold in 1960 to Grosvenor Shipping Co., London and renamed Grosvenor Trader. Sold in 1967 to Progress Marine Enterprises, Cyprus and renamed Gloria. Scrapped at Shanghai in December 1968.

== Davy Crockett ==
Davy Crockett was built by Todd Houston Shipbuilding Corporation. Her keel was laid on 18 July 1941. She was launched on 19 April 1942 and delivered on 2 June. Laid up in Suisun Bay post-war, she was sold for scrapping at Portland, Oregon in March 1969, but was resold and converted to a pipelaying vessel at Richmond. Laid up at Tacoma in 1988. Converted to a barge in 1999 for General Construction, Seattle. Scrapped 2011–2013.

== Deal Island ==
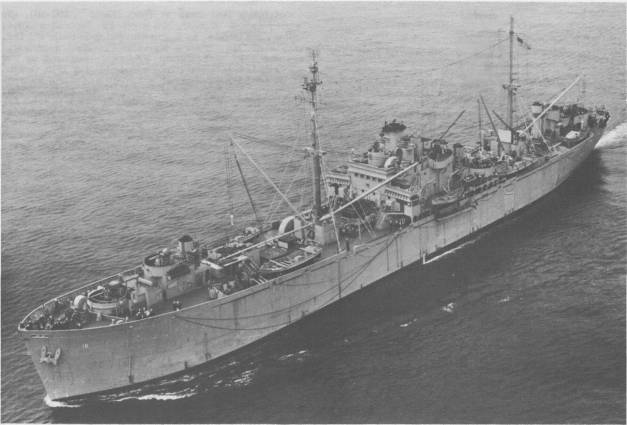
USS Kermit Roosevelt

Deal Island was built by Bethlehem Fairfield Shipyard. Her keel was laid as Deal Island on 30 August 1944. She was launched as Kermit Roosevelt on 5 October and delivered to the United States Navy on 21 October. Placed in reserve at Bremerton, Washington in October 1959. To United States Maritime Administration in June 1960 and renamed Deal Island. Scrapped at Portland, Oregon in August 1960.

== Deborah Gannett ==
Deborah Gannett was built by Bethlehem Fairfield Shipyard. Her keel was laid on 10 March 1944. She was launched on 10 April and delivered on 21 April. She was scrapped at Baltimore in 1962.

== Delazon Smith ==
Delazon Smith was built by Oregon Shipbuilding Corporation. Her keel was laid on 17 June 1943. She was launched on 7 July and delivered on 14 July. She was scrapped at Mobile in December 1967.

== De Witt Clinton ==
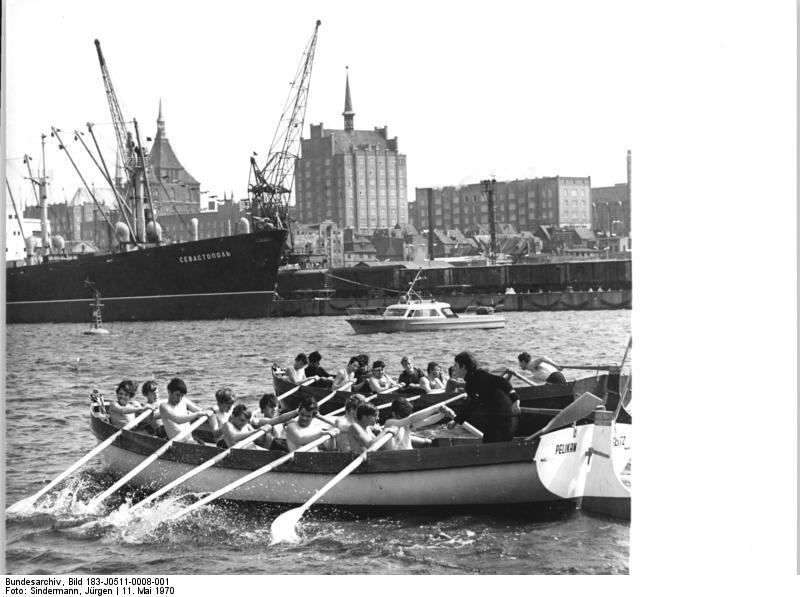
Sevastopol

De Witt Clinton was built by Oregon Shipbuilding Corporation. Her keel was laid on 1 April 1943. She was launched on 22 April and delivered on 29 April. To the Soviet Union under Lend-Lease and renamed Sevastopol. Listed as non-seagoing in 1970, she was deleted from shipping registers in 1986.

== Dexter W. Fellows ==
Dexter W. Fellows was built by Bethlehem Fairfield Shipyard. Her keel was laid on 12 May 1944. She was launched on 16 June and delivered on 29 June. Built for the WSA, she was operated under the management of A. J. Burbank & Co. Sold in 1947 to Ponchelet Marine Corp., New York and renamed Diana H. Ponchelet. Sold in 1948 to Weyerhauser Steamship Co., New York and renamed George S. Long. Sold in 1969 to Reliance Carriers, Panama and renamed Reliance Harmony. Operated under the management of Hongkong Maritime Co. Collided with the Chinese cargo ship Maritime Express off Hososhima, Japan (32°18′N 131°54′E) and sank on 6 November 1969 whilst on a voyage from Ube, Japan to an Indian port.

== Diligence ==
Diligence was a repair ship built by Bethlehem Fairfield Shipyard. Her keel was laid on 7 June 1944. She was launched on 8 July and delivered to the United States Navy on 20 July.Transferred to the Royal Navy under Lend-Lease. Returned to the United States Navy in January 1946 and laid up in Suisun Bay. Sold for scrapping at Karachi in March 1973.

== Dionysus ==
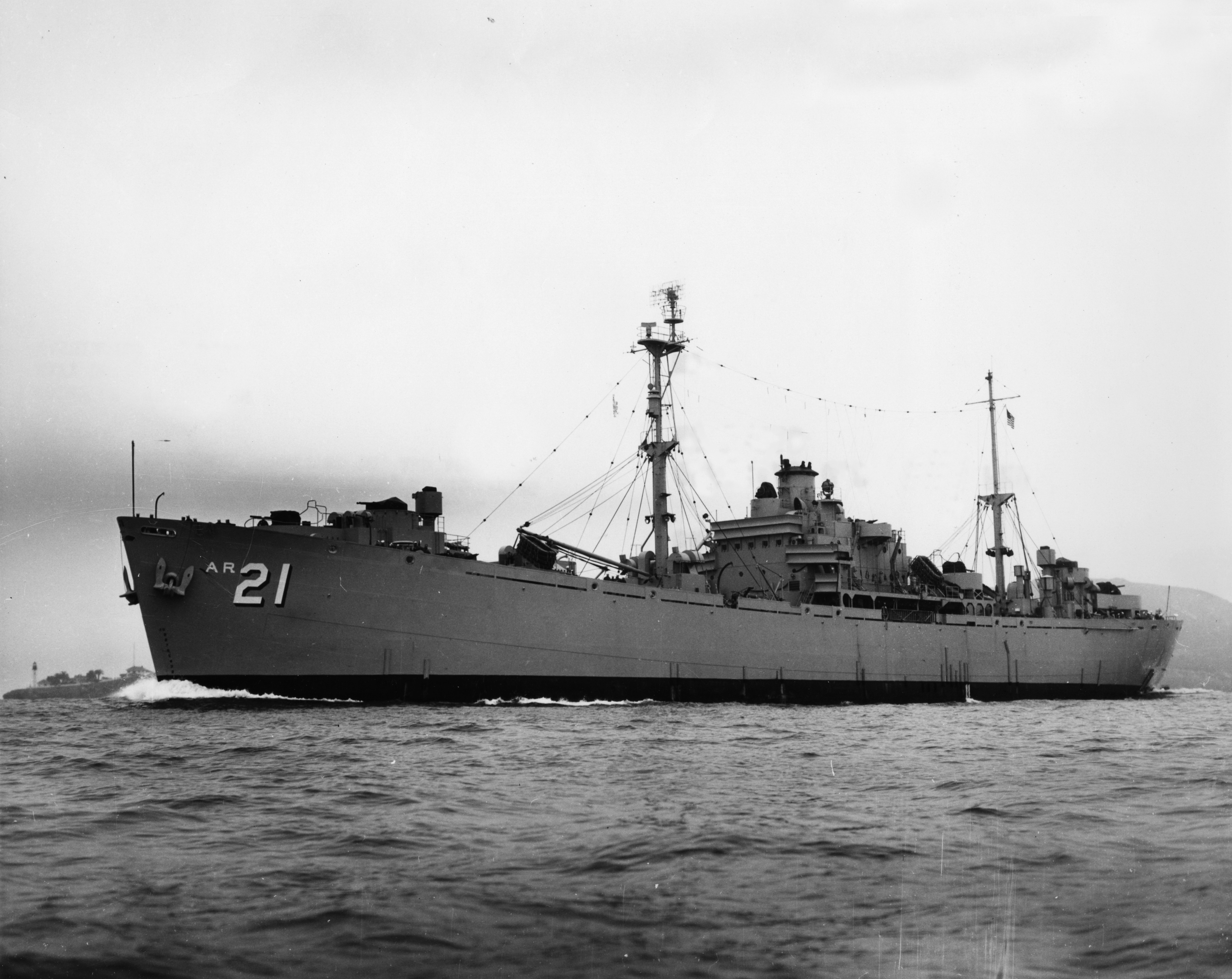
USS Dionysus

Dionysus was built by Bethlehem Fairfield Shipyard. Her keel was laid on 4 October 1944. She was launched on 10 October and delivered on 25 October. Intended for transfer to Royal Navy as Faithful, but retained by United States Navy. Placed in reserve at San Pedro, California in January 1947. Recommissioned in February 1952. Placed in reserve at Orange, Texas in April 1955. Subsequently moved to Beaumont. Scrapped in 1978.

== Dodekanisos ==
Dodekanisos was built by New England Shipbuilding Corporation. Her keel was laid on 14 March 1945. She was launched as Frederick Austin on 3 April and delivered as Dodekanisos on 23 May. Built for Constantine G. Gratsos, Athens. Renamed Audrey in 1947. Sold in 1959 to Amfialos Maritime Co., Panama. Remained under the Greek flag. Scrapped at Chittagong, India in October 1970.

== Dolly Madison ==
Dolly Madison was built by J. A. Jones Construction Company, Panama City. Her keel was laid on 20 May 1943. She was launched on 27 September and delivered on 14 October. Built for the WSA, she was operated under the management of Merchants & Miners Transportation Co. Sold in 1947 to Suwanee Fruit & Steamship Corp., Jacksonville. Sold in 1949 to Honduras Shipping Co., Tegucigalpa, Honduras. Sold in 1950 to Talamanca Compania Navigation, Panama and renamed Archangelos. Reflagged to Liberia in 1954. Placed under the management of G. M. Livanos in 1955. Management transferred to Ocean Shipbrokerage in 1956. Sprang a leak off Baja California, Mexico (24°10′N 111°50′W) and sank on 15 November 1964 whilst on a voyage from Philadelphia to Tokyo, Japan.

== Donald H. Holland ==
Donald H. Holland was built by New England Shipbuilding Corporation. Her keel was laid on 26 December 1944. She was launched on 20 February 1945 and delivered on 5 March. Built for the WSA, she was operated under the management of West India Steamships Ltd. Management transferred to Luckenbach Steamship Co. Inc. in 1947. Sold in 1950 to United States Navigation Lines, Wilmington Sold in 1952 to Falmouth Steamship Corp. and renamed Seadaring. Operated under the management of Orion Shipping & Trading Co. Renamed Ike in 1953, management transferred to Starboard Shipping Inc. Sold in 1959 to Doric Shipping & Trading Corp. Struck a reef off Jabal Zuqar, North Yemen (14°40′N 42°49′E) on 28 November 1962 whilst on a voyage from Sfax, Tunisia to Saigon, South Vietnam. She was beached the next day and abandoned as a constructive total loss.

== Donald Macleay ==
Donald Macleay was built by Oregon Shipbuilding Corporation. Her keel was laid on 12 June 1943. She was launched on 1 July and delivered on 9 July. She was scrapped at Portland, Oregon in December 1967.

== Donald M. Dickenson ==
Donald M. Dickenson was built by Permanente Metals Corporation. Her keel was laid on 26 August 1943. She was launched on 16 September and delivered on 23 September. She was scrapped at Philadelphia in August 1965.

== Donald S. Wright ==
Donald S. Wright was built by Delta Shipbuilding Company. Her keel was laid on 15 January 1945. She was launched on 22 February and delivered on 13 March. Built for the WSA, she was operated under the management of A. L. Burbank & Co. Management transferred to American Pacific Steamship Co. in 1946, then to Alcoa Steamship Co. later that year. Sold in 1949 to Strathmore Shipping Co., New York and renamed Strathcape. Sold in 1952 to Troy Shipping Co., Dover, Delaware and renamed Trojan Seaman. Sold in 1954 to Central Navigation Corp. and renamed Georgel. Reflagged to Liberia and operated under the management of Seres Shipping Inc. Management transferred to Seres Shipping Co. in 1959. Scrapped at Hirao in August 1968.

== Donald W. Bain ==
Donald W. Bain was built by J. A. Jones Construction Company, Brunswick. Her keel was laid on 17 April 1944. She was launched on 25 May and delivered on 17 June. Built for the WSA, she was operated under the management of Norton Lilly Management Co. Management transferred to Cosmopolitan Shipping Co., New York in 1946. Sold to her managers in 1947. Sold to Dolphin Shipping Corp., New York in 1949 and renamed Lilica. Driven ashore at Civitavecchia, Italy on 25 December 1951 whilst on a voyage from the Hampton Roads to Civitavecchia. Refloated on 30 December but declared a constructive total loss. Sold to Società di Navigazione Tito Campanella, Genoa. Repaired and renamed Elisa Campanella. New Fiat diesel engine fitted at Genoa in 1955. Scrapped at Vado Ligure in June 1969.

== Don Marquis ==
Don Marquis was built by California Shipbuilding Corporation. Her keel was laid on 31 July 1943. She was launched on 21 August and delivered on 11 September. Built for the WSA, she was operated under the management of Oliver J. Olson. Collided with the American tanker Missionary Ridge north of New Guinea (2°10′S 147°32′E) on 26 September 1944 whilst on a voyage from Langemark Bay to Seeadler Harbor, New Guinea. Don Marquis caught fire and was beached. She was refloated on 28 September and towed to Seeadler Harbor, where she was declared a constructive total loss. Acquired by the United States Navy in May 1945 and used as a hulk. Returned to the WSA in November 1949 and laid up. She was scrapped at Manus Island, Papua New Guinea in 1949.

== Dudley H. Thomas ==
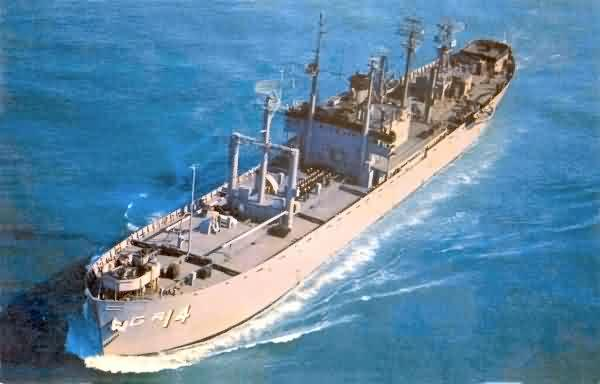
USS Interpreter

Dudley H. Thomas was built by J. A. Jones Construction Co., Panama City. Her keel was laid on 5 January 1945. She was launched on 8 February and delivered on 21 February. A boxed aircraft transport ship, she was laid up in 1947. Acquired by the United States Navy in June 1957, she was converted for naval use at Philadelphia Naval Shipyard. Entered service as Interpreter. Placed in reserve in July 1965, she was laid up in Suisun Bay. She was sold for scrapping at Terminal Island in October 1974.

== Dudley M. Hughes ==
Dudley M. Hughes was built by Southeastern Shipbuilding Corporation. Her keel was laid on 26 June 1943. She was launched on 27 August and delivered on 11 September. Built for the WSA, she was operated under the management of Grace Lines. Sold in 1947 to Theofano Maritime Co., Greece and renamed Aliakmon. Operated under the management of Livanos. Sold in 1962 to Atlantic Plovidba, Dubrovnik, Yugoslavia and renamed Cavtat. Sold in 1965 to Lebanon Shipping Lines and renamed Sheik Boutros. Operated under the management of Nomicos Ltd. Scrapped at Whampoa Dock, Hong Kong in May 1969.

== Dumaran ==
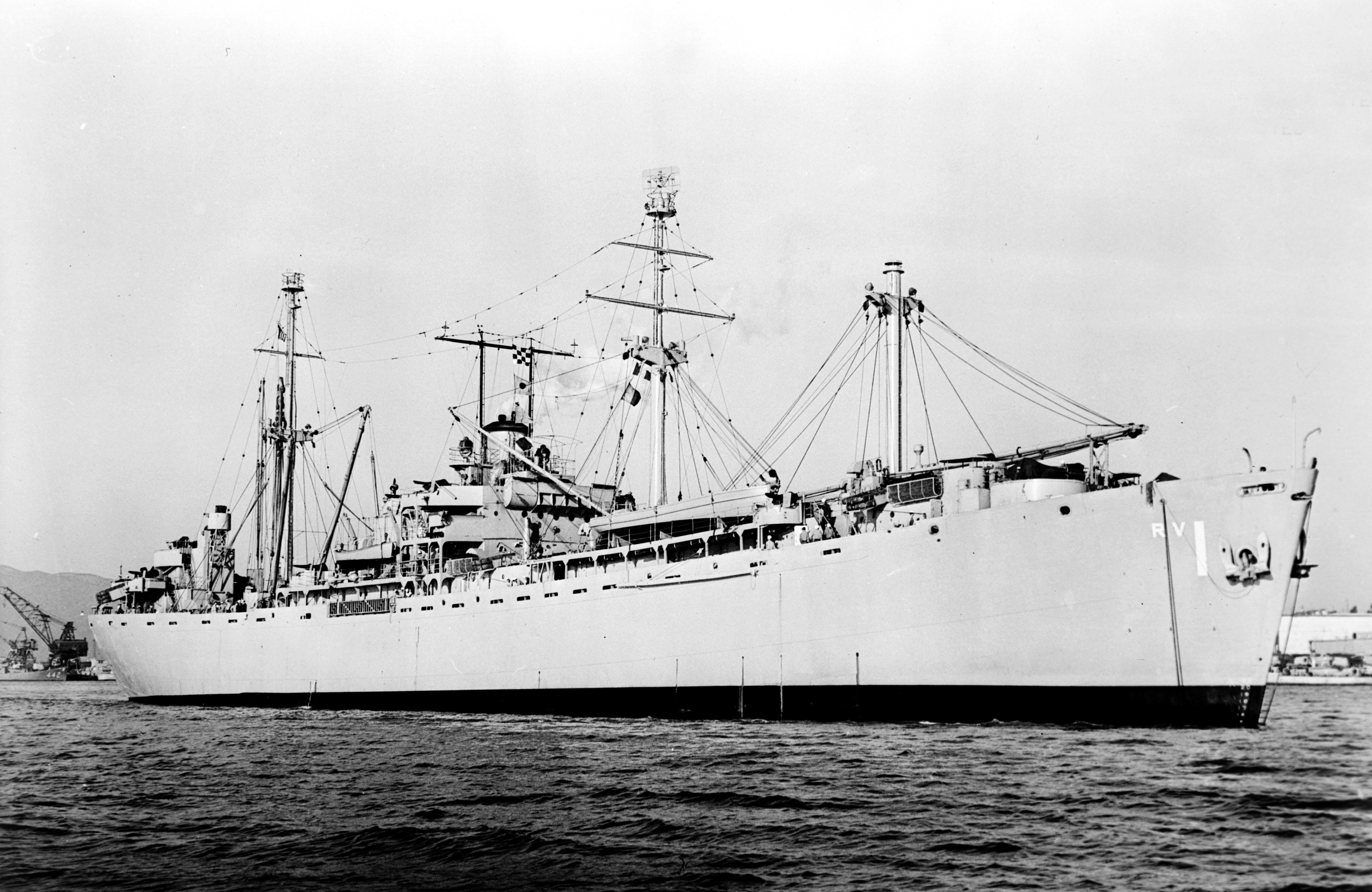
USS Chourre

Dumaran was built by Bethlehem Fairfield Shipyards. Her keel was laid on 20 April 1944. She was launched as Dumaran on 22 May and delivered as Chourre on 31 May. Built for the United States Navy, she was laid up at Stockton, California in November 1948. Recommissioned in February 1952, she was laid up in Suisun Bay in September 1955. She was sold to American shipbreakers in February 1971.

== Duncan L. Clinch ==
Duncan L. Clinch was built by J. A. Jones Construction Company, Brunswick. Her keel was laid on 22 August 1944. She was launched on 6 October and delivered on 20 October. Built for the WSA, she was operated under the management of American Export Co. Struck a mine in the Havre Roads on 23 December 1945 and was damaged. She sank at the bow on 27 December, breaking in two the next day. She was declared a total loss.

== Duncan U. Fletcher ==
Duncan U. Fletcher was built by J. A. Jones Construction Company, Panama City. Her keel was laid on 3 May 1943. She was launched on 10 August and delivered on 27 August. Built for the WSA, she was operated under the management of Lyles Bros. Steamship Co. sold in 1947 to Ionian Steamship Co., Greece and renamed Pericles. Placed under the management of Vergottis Ltd. in 1948. Ran aground on the Ajax Reef, 25 nautical miles (46 km) south of Miami, Florida (25°25′N 80°07′W) on 19 April 1966 whilst on a voyage from Swansea, United Kingdom to Tampa, Florida. Refloated on 28 April and towed to Turtle Cay, then New Orleans. Made a subsequent voyage to Kobe, Japan. Sold for scrap in September 1966. Renamed Tung Ho for voyage to shipbreakers. Scrapped at Kaohsiung in December 1966.

== Dunham Wright ==
Dunham Wright was built by Oregon Shipbuilding Corporation. Her keel was laid on 29 July 1943. She was launched on 17 August and delivered on 25 August. She was scrapped at Tacoma in April 1961.

== Dutiful ==
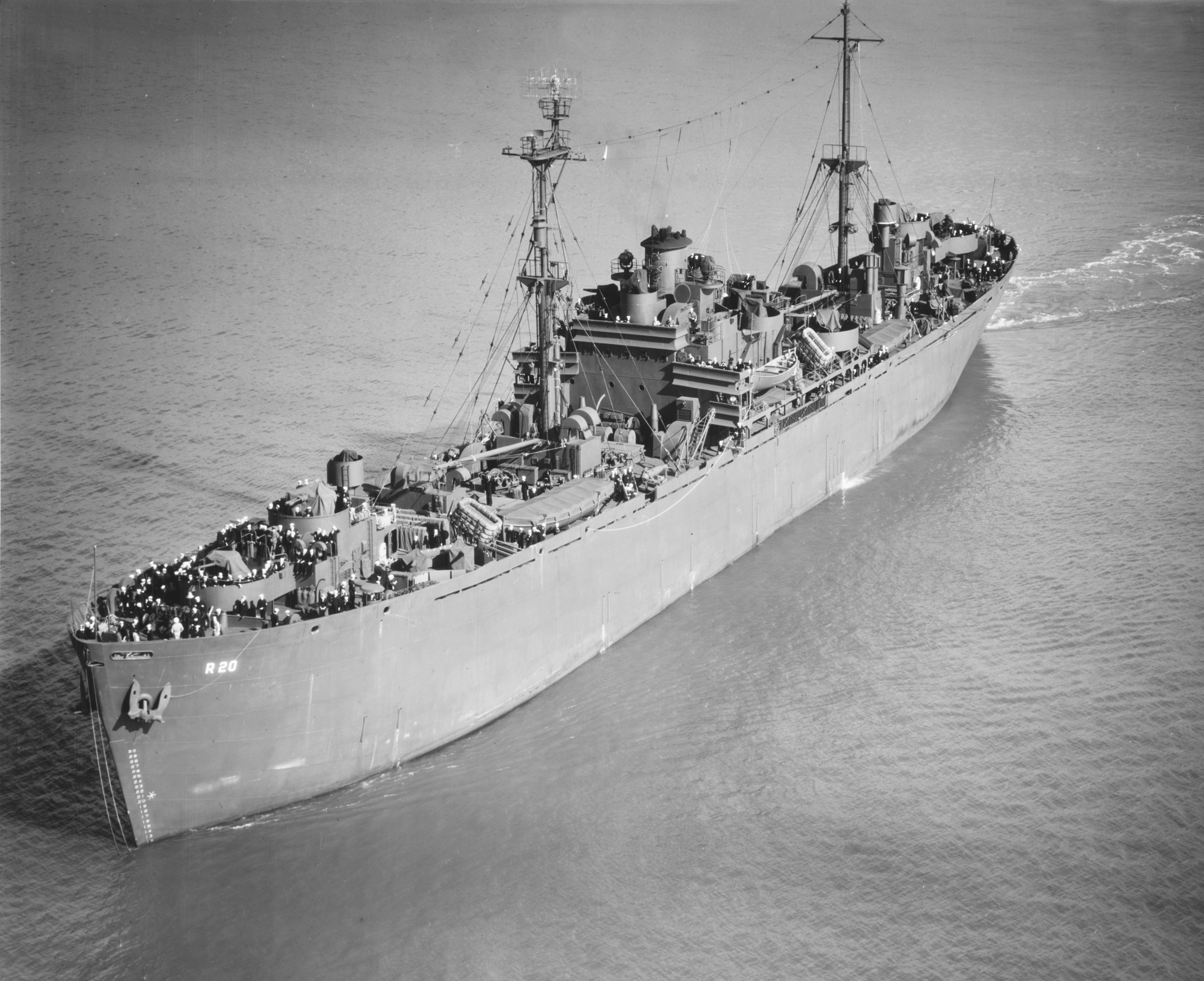
USS Laertes

Dutiful was built by California Shipbuilding Corporation. Completed in September 1944 as the United States Navy repair ship Reliance. Intended for transfer to the Royal Navy as Dutiful but retained by the United States Navy as Laertes. Laid up at San Diego, California in January 1947. Recommissioned in December 1951. Placed in reserve at San Diego in February 1954. Moved to Suisun Bay in 1961. Scrapped at Tacoma in or after September 1972.

== D. W. Harrington ==
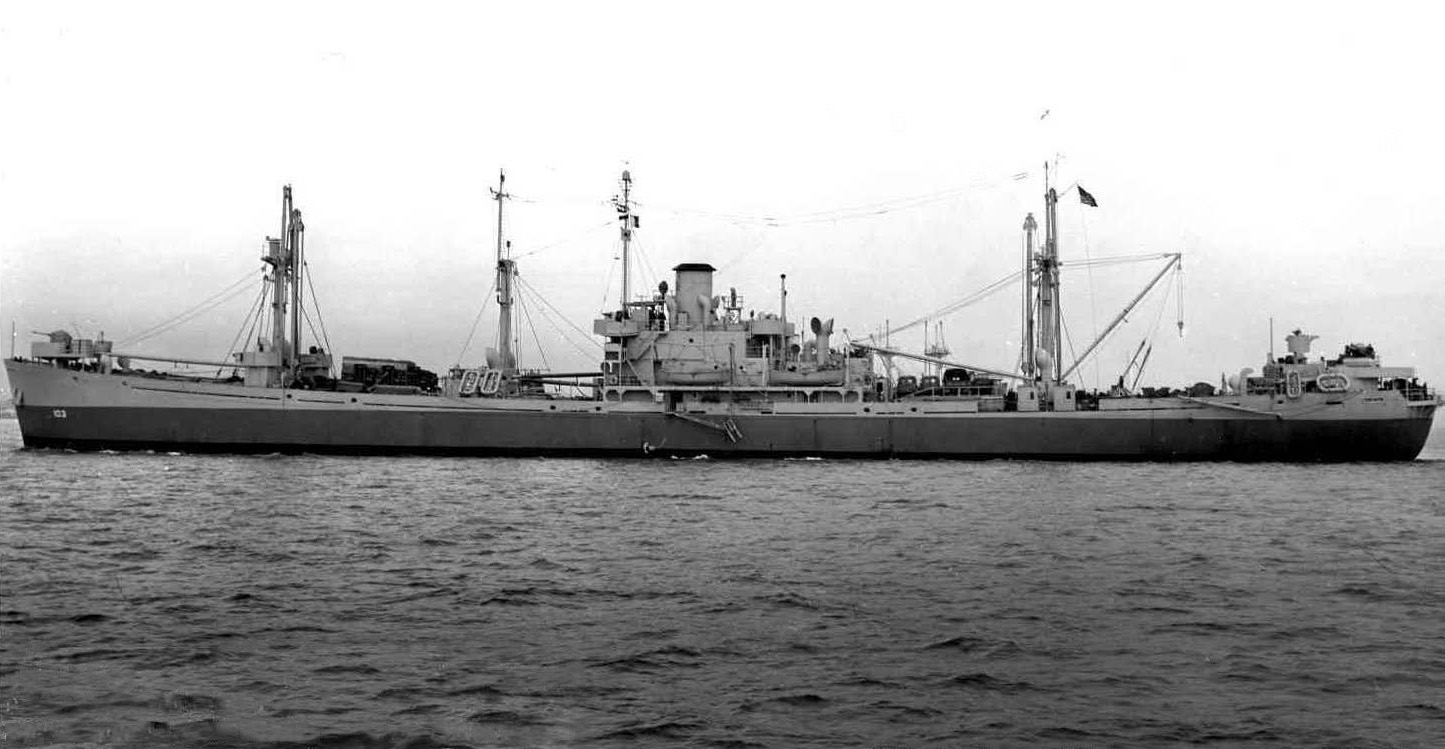
USS Sculptor

D. W. Harrington was built by California Shipbuilding Corporation. Her keel was laid on 18 May 1943. She was launched on 10 June and delivered on 22 June. To United States Navy as Sculptor. Returned to WSA in March 1946, renamed D. W. Harrington and laid up in reserve. Sold in 1947 to B. D. & P. D. Pantaleon, Piraeus, Greece and renamed Dimosthenis Pantaleon. Sold in 1949 to Pantaleon Navigation Co., Athens. Laid up at Piraeus in 1968, she was scrapped at Trieste, Italy in September 1969.

== Dwight B. Heard ==
Dwight B. Heard was built by California Shipbuilding Corporation. Her keel was laid on 5 August 1943. She was launched as Dwight B. Heard on 28 August and delivered as Sambur on 14 September. To MoWT under Lend-Lease, operated under the management of Ellerman's Wilson Line. Renamed Samwharfe in 1944. To USMC on 1947 and renamed Dwight B. Heard. Laid up in the James River. Scrapped at Philadelphia in 1960.

== Dwight L. Moody ==
Dwight L. Moody was built by J. A. Jones Construction Company, Panama City. Her keel was laid on 4 March 1943. She was launched on 28 March and delivered on 24 July. Laid up at Beaumont post-war, she was scuttled off Port Mansfield, Texas on 6 April 1976.

== Dwight W. Morrow ==
Dwight W. Morrow was built by St. Johns River Shipbuilding Company. Her keel was laid on 5 July 1943. She was launched on 21 September and delivered on 5 October. She was scrapped at Mobile in December 1969.

== Sources ==
- Sawyer, L. A.; Mitchell, W. H. (1985). The Liberty Ships (2nd ed.). London: Lloyd's of London Press Ltd. ISBN 1-85044-049-2.
