= Xanthus =

Xanthus (/ˈzænθəs/; Ancient Greek: Ξάνθος, Xanthos, "yellow, blond") or Xanthos may refer to:

== In Greek mythology ==
- Xanthos (King of Thebes), the son of Ptolemy, killed by Andropompus or Melanthus
- Xanthus (mythology), several figures, including gods, men, and horses
- Balius and Xanthus, the horses of Achilles

== People ==
- Xanthus, Greek philosopher, master of the slave and fabulist Aesop
- Xanthus (historian), mid-5th century BC logographer who wrote a history of Lydia
- Xanthos Hadjisoteriou (1920-2003), Greek Cypriot painter and interior designer
- Xanthus Pagninius (1470–1541), Dominican, leading philologist and Biblical scholar
- Xanthus Russell Smith, American artist
- Xanthos (surname)

== Geography ==
- Xanthus (city) or Xanthos, city in ancient Lycia, the site of present-day Kınık, Antalya Province, Turkey
- Xanthus (river) or Xanthos, river in ancient Lycia on which the city Xanthus was situated
- Xanthus (Lesbos) or Xanthos, a town of ancient Lesbos, Greece
- Xanthus Spur on the Trojan Range, mountain range in the Palmer Archipelago of the British Antarctic Territory

== The arts ==
- Xanthus, the antagonist in the musical People Are Wrong!
- Xanthus, the fictional character in Robert Newcomb's fantasy series Blood and Stone
- Xanthus, the name of Aristotle Bolt's estate in the Disney movie Escape to Witch Mountain (1975 film)

== Species ==
- Calliostoma xanthos, a species of sea snail
- Cephonodes xanthus, a moth of the family Sphingidae
- Myxococcus xanthus, a proteobacterium
- Paracirrhites xanthus, a hawkfish from the Eastern Central Pacific
- Protambulyx xanthus, a synonym for Protambulyx eurycles, a species of moth of the family Sphingidae

== Other uses ==
- Xanthus, the Latin form of Xanthos, an ancient Lycian city
- 4544 Xanthus, an asteroid
- Xanthus-class repair ship, a class of five auxiliary ships built for the United States Navy and Royal Navy
- USS Xanthus, a Xanthus-class repair ship acquired by the United States Navy

== See also ==
- Xanthus stele or Xanthian Obelisk, a stele bearing an inscription currently believed to be trilingual, in the ancient Lycian city of Xanthos
- Euxanthus
- Xanthius
- Xantho
- Xanthosis
