= List of equipment of the Royal Navy =

This is a list of equipment used in the Royal Navy.

== Naval ships ==
=== Lists of active ships ===
- Category:Naval ships of the United Kingdom
- List of active Royal Navy ships
- List of active ships of the Royal Fleet Auxiliary
- List of active Royal Marines military watercraft
- List of active ships of Serco Marine Services

=== List of ships by name ===
- List of ship names of the Royal Navy
  - List of ship names of the Royal Navy (A)
  - List of ship names of the Royal Navy (B)
  - List of ship names of the Royal Navy (C)
  - List of ship names of the Royal Navy (D-F)
  - List of ship names of the Royal Navy (G-H)
  - List of ship names of the Royal Navy (I-L)
  - List of ship names of the Royal Navy (M-N)
  - List of ship names of the Royal Navy (O-Q)
  - List of ship names of the Royal Navy (R-T)
  - List of ship names of the Royal Navy (U-Z)
- List of Royal Fleet Auxiliary ship names

=== Lists of ships by type ===
- List of aircraft carriers of the Royal Navy
- Aircraft maintenance carriers of the Royal Navy
- List of amphibious warfare ships of the Royal Navy
- List of amphibious warfare ships of the Royal Fleet Auxiliary
- List of battlecruisers of the Royal Navy
- List of pre-dreadnought battleships of the Royal Navy
- List of dreadnought battleships of the Royal Navy
- List of bomb vessels of the Royal Navy
- List of corvette and sloop classes of the Royal Navy
- List of cruiser classes of the Royal Navy
- List of destroyer classes of the Royal Navy
- List of early warships of the English Navy
- List of escort carriers of the Royal Navy
- List of fireships of the Royal Navy
- List of frigate classes of the Royal Navy
  - Type system of the Royal Navy
- List of gunboat and gunvessel classes of the Royal Navy
- List of gun-brigs of the Royal Navy
- List of hospitals and hospital ships of the Royal Navy
- List of ironclads of the Royal Navy
- List of mine countermeasure vessels of the Royal Navy
- List of miscellaneous ships of the Royal Fleet Auxiliary
- List of monitors of the Royal Navy
- List of breastwork monitors of the Royal Navy
- List of patrol vessels of the Royal Navy
- List of replenishment ships of the Royal Fleet Auxiliary
- List of royal yachts of the United Kingdom
- List of seaplane carriers of the Royal Navy
- List of ships of the line of the Royal Navy
- List of submarines of the Royal Navy
- List of submarine classes of the Royal Navy
- List of support ships of the Royal Navy
- List of survey vessels of the Royal Navy
- List of torpedo boat classes of the Royal Navy
- Trawlers of the Royal Navy
- List of requisitioned trawlers of the Royal Navy (WWII)
- List of warships of the Scots Navy

== Aircraft and helicopters ==
- List of aircraft of the Royal Naval Air Service
- List of aircraft of the Fleet Air Arm
  - List of Fleet Air Arm aircraft in World War II
- List of active United Kingdom military aircraft
- List of British airships

== Anti-aircraft weapons and equipment ==
- Holman Projector – retired

=== Naval anti-aircraft guns ===
- 30mm DS30M Mark 2 Automated Small Calibre Gun
- 4.7 inch QF Mark IX & XII – retired
- Bofors 40mm gun – retired
- Oerlikon 20mm cannon
- Ordnance QF 3-pounder Vickers – retired
- Phalanx CIWS
- QF 2-pounder naval gun – retired
- QF 3-inch 20 cwt – retired
- QF 4 inch Mk V naval gun – retired
- QF 4 inch Mk XVI naval gun – retired
- QF 4.5-inch Mk I - V naval gun – retired
- QF 4.7 inch Mk VIII naval gun – retired
- Vickers .50 machine gun – retired

=== Surface-to-air anti-aircraft missiles ===
- Fairey Stooge – retired
- Seacat – retired
- Sea Ceptor
- Sea Dart – retired
- Seaslug – retired
- Sea Viper
- Sea Wolf

=== Surface-to-air anti-aircraft rockets ===
- Unrotated projectile - retired

=== Anti-aircraft equipment ===
- Fuze Keeping Clock
- Gyro rate unit
- HACS
- Hazemeyer gun mount
- Pom-Pom director

== Anti-submarine weapons and equipment ==
=== Anti-submarine missiles ===
- Ikara - retired

=== Anti-submarine mortars ===
- BL 7.5-inch naval howitzer - retired
- Fairlie Mortar – retired
- Hedgehog – retired
- Limbo – retired
- Squid – retired

=== Anti-submarine sonar and equipment ===
- List of British Asdic systems
- Sonar 2076
- Sonar 2087

=== Depth charges ===
- Mk 11 depth charge

=== Nuclear bombs 1950s-1990s ===
- WE.177 - retired
- Red Beard - retired

=== Homing torpedoes ===
- 18" Mark 30 torpedo - retired
- Stingray
- Tigerfish - retired

== Guided missiles ==
=== Air-to-air missiles ===
- AIM-7 Sparrow – retired
- AIM-9 Sidewinder
- ASRAAM
- AIM-120 AMRAAM
- Firestreak – retired
- Red Top – retired

=== Air-to-surface missiles ===
- AGM-12 Bullpup – retired
- Martlet
- SS.11 – retired
- SS.12/AS.12 – retired
- Sea Skua – retired
- Sea Eagle – retired
- Sea Venom

=== Land attack missiles ===
- Tomahawk

=== Anti-ship missiles ===
- Exocet – retired
- Harpoon
- Naval Strike Missile
- Red Angel – retired

=== Submarine-launched ballistic missiles ===
- UGM-27 Polaris – Retired. See the ET.317 nuclear warhead, Chevaline and the Polaris (UK nuclear programme)
- Trident II D5 missile - See the Trident (UK nuclear programme)

== Unmanned aerial vehicles ==
- Boeing Insitu ScanEagle
- Target Technology Ltd Imp

=== Target drones ===
- Airspeed Queen Wasp
- Curtiss Queen Seamew
- De Havilland DH.82 Queen Bee
- Northrop MQM-36 Shelduck
- Miles Queen Marinet
- Northrop BQM-74 Chukar

== Mine disposal systems ==
- Paravane

=== Remotely operated underwater vehicles ===
- Seafox drone

== Unguided rockets ==
=== Air-to-surface rockets ===
- RP-3
- SNEB

== Naval artillery weapons and equipment ==
=== Naval guns ===
- 4.5 inch Mark 8 naval gun

=== Naval artillery equipment ===
- Admiralty Fire Control Table - retired
- Vickers range clock - retired

== Torpedoes ==
- British 18 inch torpedo
- British 21 inch torpedo
- British 24.5 inch torpedo
- Spearfish torpedo
- Whitehead torpedo – retired

== Naval radars ==
- see List of World War II British naval radar
- Type 965 radar
- Type 984 radar
- Type 997 Artisan radar
- Type 1022 Radar
- S1850M
- SAMPSON

== Uniforms ==
- Royal Navy ranks, rates, and uniforms of the 18th and 19th centuries
- Uniforms of the Royal Navy

== Royal Marines ==
- List of equipment of the Royal Marines
- List of active Royal Marines military watercraft
- Uniforms of the Royal Marines

== Equipment by era ==
- Category:World War II naval weapons of the United Kingdom
- List of British naval forces military equipment of World War II
- List of Royal Navy military equipment of the Cold War

== Other equipment ==
- Corsham Computer Centre
- NATO Submarine Rescue System
- Submarine Command System

== See also ==
- Active Royal Navy weapon systems
