= Xanthopoulos =

Xanthopoulos (Greek: Ξανθόπουλος, IPA: [ksanˈθopulos]) is a Greek surname which means "son of Xanthos", where Xanthos means a person with "yellow, fair hair". Its female version corresponds to the masculine genitive Xanthopoulou (Ξανθοπούλου [ksanθoˈpulu]). The name may refer to:

- Basilis C. Xanthopoulos (1951–1990), Greek physicist
- Callistus Xanthopoulos (died 1397), Patriarch of Constantinople
- Charalambos Xanthopoulos (born 1956), Greek football player
- Christos Xanthopoulos (born 1954), Greek football player
- Ignatios Xanthopoulos, 14th-century Greek Orthodox Christian monk
- Isidore Xanthopoulos (died 1462), Patriarch of Constantinople
- Nikephoros Kallistos Xanthopoulos, Byzantine historian
- Nikos Xanthopoulos (1934–2023), Greek actor
- Petros Xanthopoulos (born 1959), Greek football player
- Vassilis Xanthopoulos (born 1984), Greek basketball player
