= Xanthos (surname) =

Xanthos is a Greek surname. It is the surname of:

- Andreas Xanthos, Greek medical doctor and government minister of Health.
- Emmanuil Xanthos (1772–1852), Greek merchant

== See also ==
- Xanthus (disambiguation)
