= Xanthus-class repair ship =

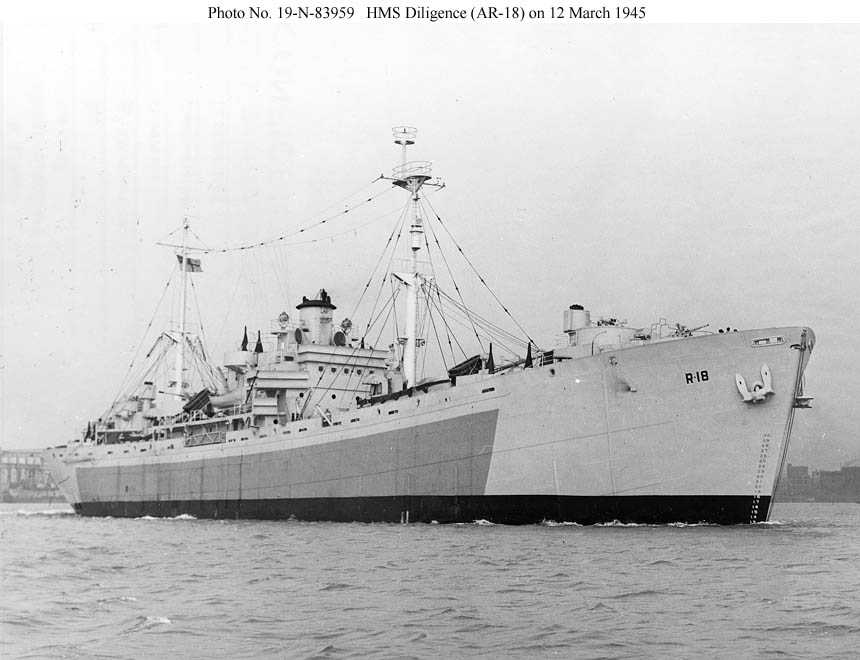
- AR-18 (HMS Diligence), a Xanthus type destined for the Royal Navy, March 1945.

Class overview
- Name: Xanthus class
- Builders: Bethlehem-Fairfield Shipyard
- Operators: United States Navy; Royal Navy
- In commission: 1945–1955
- Planned: 5
- Completed: 5
- Active: 0

General characteristics
- Type: Repair ship
- Displacement: 5801 tons
- Length: 441 feet 7 inches
- Beam: 56 feet 11 inches
- Draft: 22 feet
- Propulsion: Hooven, Owens, Rentschler Co. vertical triple expansion, 1 screw rated at 2500 shp
- Speed: 12.5 knots
- Complement: 525
- Armament: 1 × 5"/38 dual-purpose gun; 3 × 3"/50 AA guns; 2 × twin 40mm Bofors AA guns; 12 × 20mm Oerlikon AA guns

The Xanthus-class repair ships were a class of five auxiliary ships built for the United States Navy and Royal Navy. Ships of the class served in a diverse range of environments in varying capacities during both World War II and the Korean War. Xanthus-class ships were in commission between 1945–1955.

== Description ==
On 26 February 1944, the United States CNO FADM Ernest J. King authorized the construction of five vessels in response to a British Royal Navy request for several Heavy Duty Fleet Repair Ships. These ships were to have been constructed in the United States and later transferred to Britain under the Lend-Lease agreement. The hull alterations and armament were to be based on the ARG type, with BuShips responsible for installing any repair ship facilities that could be accommodated. Liberty hulls that were already under construction for allocation to the U.K. were selected for conversion. In a preliminary planning meeting on February 3, 1944, an attempt was made to use the plans of Tutuila (ARG-4), but it quickly became evident that the characteristics desired by the British differed so significantly in details that entirely new internal arrangement plans would be necessary. Disputes over the alterations continued into June 1944, with the U.S. reportedly insisting on retaining certain items that would make the ships suitable for U.S. use if they did not go to the U.K. Initially, all five ships were to be transferred to Britain under Lend-Lease, and the British assigned names to all of them; however, the last three were reallocated to the U.S. Navy on November 23, 1944, before completion. AR-19, the only unit not converted in Baltimore, was modified in East Boston, Massachusetts, where she was towed in late August 1944. Her commissioning was delayed due to the late delivery of a diesel generator auxiliary power switchboard.

== Design and construction ==
Xanthus-class vessels were first laid down in mid-1944 by Bethlehem-Fairfield Shipyard under a Maritime Commission contract. These ships were originally intended as Liberty ships, hull design EC2-S-C1 (which, at the time, were also under construction for Britain). Instead, five of the partially completed Liberty ship hulls were requisitioned for conversion into repair ships.

It was soon realized that the Liberty ship hull and configuration would not be suitable for the role of repair ship. Substantial modification was necessary in order to ensure operating efficiency and functionality. A planning commission investigating the problem decided that the modifications would be based on the design of Luzon-class repair ships, ARG type repair ships which had already seen substantial service in the Pacific. Construction proceeded, with initial hull alterations and armament based on the Luzon class. The Luzon-class repair ship USS Tutuila (ARG-4) was selected as the conversion template. It was quickly realized that conversion based ultimately off the Luzon would not be entirely successful, because British configuration requirements for the ships differed substantially from the Luzon design. A complete overhaul of the internal configuration, and thus completely new plans for the internal configuration, were necessary.

Each remained in Bethlehem-Fairfield Shipyard for most of the construction process. At approximately 80% completion, the ships were transferred to the conversion docks. Four of the five ships remained in Maryland and were converted by the Maryland Drydock Company. The other ship, AR-19, was sent to Bethlehem-Simpson Yard in Boston, Massachusetts.

While all five ships were intended for the Royal Navy, only two were delivered. The other three were expropriated by the US Navy sometime prior to completion and were given the Xanthus class designation.

== Operational history ==
Xanthus-class vessels provided a diverse range of auxiliary repair functions for both the US and British navies. American-flagged ships served in the Pacific with the US Navy, repairing ships damaged in the final battles against Japan. These ships continued their role after the war by providing support for the Allied occupation of Japan. British flagged ships served in the Atlantic with the Royal Navy repairing both aircraft and destroyers before being returned to the United States shortly following the war's end.

One ship, USS Laertes, also served in the Korean War.

=== HMS Assistance (F173) / (AR-17) ===
HMS Assistance was laid down in May 1944 and delivered to the Royal Navy on 20 January 1945. The ship served in British home waters as an aircraft depot and repair ship. She was returned to US Navy and transferred to the National Defense Reserve Fleet in 1946.

=== HMS Diligence (F174) / (AR-18) ===
HMS Diligence was laid down in June 1944 and transferred to Britain in 1945. She served as a destroyer repair vessel until returning to US Navy in 1946. She was subsequently transferred to National Defense Reserve Fleet.

=== USS Xanthus (AR-19) ===
USS Xanthus was laid down in June 1944, launched in July and finally commissioned in May 1945. She arrived at Pearl Harbor on 20 July 1945 and briefly served in the repair role. On 11 August, Xanthus sailed for Alaska, where she was to join forces massing for the planned assault on the Japanese held Kuril Islands. The invasion never took place, and instead Xanthus was sent to Japan, where she served as the flagship of Task Group 56.2. Xanthus later operated out of Okinawa until January 1946.

In February 1946, Xanthus sailed for China where she supported American naval activities. She was withdrawn in April of that year and sent to the National Defense Reserve Fleet in James River, Virginia.

=== USS Laertes (AR-20) ===
USS Laertes was laid down in August 1944, launched in September and commissioned in March 1945. She was sent to the naval facilities at Enewetak Atoll, where she spent four months repairing battle damaged ships. From there she sailed to Okinawa, where she spent only a week before setting course for the United States. Laertes served several months as a pre-inactivation repair ship in Bremerton, Washington and San Diego, California before being decommissioned and entering the Pacific Reserve Fleet.

Laertes was recommissioned on 19 December 1951 in response to the outbreak of hostilities in Korea. She operated from the Japanese port of Sasebo and the Korean port of Pusan repairing the battle damaged ships of the United States Seventh Fleet.

=== USS Dionysus (AR-21) ===
USS Dionysus was laid down in September 1944, launched in October and commissioned in April 1945. She operated from Enewetak Atoll and Tokyo Bay between July and September 1945.

She was recommissioned in 1952 and joined the Atlantic Fleet, where she repaired ships in Puerto Rico and in ports along the Eastern United States.

== Ships of the Class ==
Ships of the Xanthus class
| Name | Builder | Laid down | Launched | Commissioned | Fate |
|---|---|---|---|---|---|
| HMS Assistance | Bethlehem-Fairfield | 17 May 1944 | 20 June 1944 | | Sold for scrapping, 1974 |
| HMS Diligence | Bethlehem-Fairfield | 7 June 1944 | 8 July 1944 | | Sold for scrapping, 1973 |
| USS Xanthus | Bethlehem-Fairfield | 27 June 1944 | 31 July 1944 | 9 May 1945 | Sold for scrapping, 1974 |
| USS Laertes | Bethlehem-Fairfield | 7 August 1944 | 13 September 1944 | 24 March 1945 | Sold for scrapping, 1972 |
| USS Dionysus | Bethlehem-Fairfield | 4 September 1944 | 10 October 1944 | 28 April 1945 | Sunk as artificial reef, 1978 |

== Trivia ==
The class and the lead ship were named after Xanthus, one of Achilles' horses who spoke with a human voice.

== See also ==
- List of support ships of the Royal Navy
- List of auxiliaries of the United States Navy
- War in the Pacific
