= Active Royal Navy weapon systems =

This is a list of Active Royal Navy weapon systems.

== Guns ==
=== 4.5-inch Mark 8 naval gun ===
The 4.5-inch (114 mm) Mark 8 gun can be found on all the Royal Navy's frigates and destroyers and was used from the Falklands War to the War in Iraq. The gun can fire up to 24 high explosive shells per minute, each weighing more than 40 kilograms (88 lb), at targets more than 12 miles (19 km) away – this can be extended to nearly 18 miles (29 km) if special extended-range shells are used.

The main purpose of the gun is naval gunfire support – artillery bombardment of shore targets. In this role the gun is capable of firing the equivalent of a six-gun shore battery. It can still be used as an anti-ship weapon.

=== 30 mm DS-30B Mk 1/DS30M Mark 2 naval gun ===
The 30 mm DS-30B Mk 1 and DS30M Mark 2 are 30-millimetre (1.2 in) automated naval gun systems designed to defend ships from fast inshore attack craft armed with short-range weaponry. The DS30M Mark 2 system consists of a 30 mm Mark 44 Bushmaster II cannon on a fully automated mount with an off-mount electro-optical director (EOD). The systems are fitted to all Type 23 frigates (Mk2s), Type 45 destroyers (said to be carrying Mk1s as of 2021), Batch 2 River-class offshore patrol vessels (OPVs) (Mk2s), Hunt-class mine countermeasures vessels (Mk1s), Sandown-class minehunter (Mk1) and several Royal Fleet Auxiliary (RFA) ships (Bay and Tide-class) all reported to be carrying Mk1s when they have weapons packages added. The system is capable of being deployed on the aircraft carriers HMS Queen Elizabeth and HMS Prince of Wales, but as of 2021 had not been fitted.

=== Oerlikon 20 mm cannon ===
The Oerlikon 20 mm (0.79 in) cannon can be found on the Batch 1 River-class OPVs and the multi-role replenishment ship Fort Victoria.

=== Browning .50-calibre (12.7 mm) heavy machine gun ===
The Browning .50-calibre heavy machine gun can be found fitted to ships, the first of which was HMS Atherstone in 2014, and in 2021 it was reported that HMS Lancaster had also been fitted with them. As of 2023, .50 heavy machine guns were said to be replacing the former 7.62 mm minigun on Royal Navy ships.

=== 7.62 mm miniguns ===
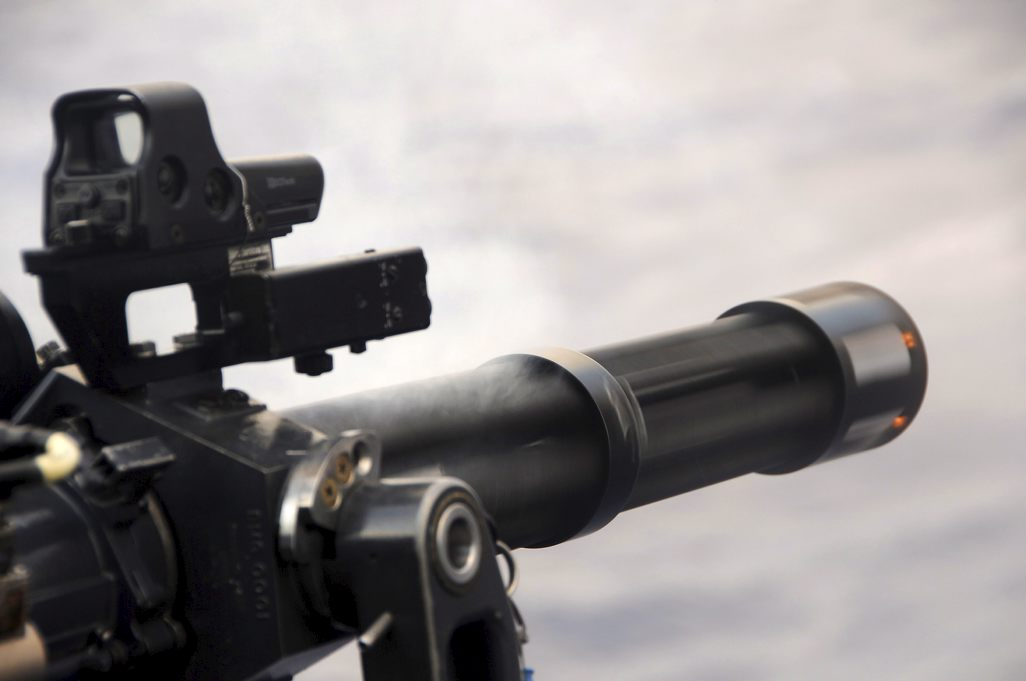
A minigun aboard HMS Monmouth

All Royal Navy ships carried miniguns for close in defence. But the system was scheduled to be retired from service in 2023 and replaced with Browning .50 caliber heavy machine guns.

=== 7.62 mm General Purpose Machine Gun (GPMG) ===
GPMGs are used for close in defence.

== Close-in weapon systems ==
=== Phalanx 20 mm ===
The Phalanx Close-in Weapon System (CIWS) is an anti-ship missile defence system. It is fitted to the Queen Elizabeth-class aircraft carriers, the Type 45 destroyers as well as Royal Fleet Auxiliary vessels when those vessels have weapon packages added. It is also currently in the designs for the new Type 26 frigate. During Operation Telic, Phalanx guns were removed from ships and were crewed by Royal Navy personnel based at Basra airport, as part of the Centurion C-RAM system.

A previous CIWS system (Goalkeeper) was fitted to several ship classes but was retired when removed from the former HMS Bulwark in 2016, when she entered extended readiness.

=== Counter-uncrewed aircraft system ===
In late 2026, photos also revealed that an undetermined counter-uncrewed aircraft (C-UAS) system for anti-drone defence had been deployed on HMS Dauntless with two 1x2 meter box launchers deployed amidships. It was unclear whether other vessels in the Type 45-class would be similarly equipped.

== Torpedoes ==
=== Spearfish torpedo ===
The Spearfish torpedo is the Royal Navy's heavyweight torpedo, weighing nearly 2 metric tons (2.0 long tons; 2.2 short tons), which is carried by both the attack submarines and ballistic missile submarines. It has a range of more than 30 mi (48 km) with a speed in excess of 92 miles per hour (148 km/h) and can be used either against other submarines or ships of any size. It carries a 300 kg (660 lb) explosive charge and is guided either by its in-built sonar or via a copper-cadmium wire.

The Spearfish is undergoing a major upgrade program which will provide sophisticated advances in its homing, warheads, tactical and fueling systems, as well an upgraded guidance link.

=== Sting Ray torpedo ===
The Sting Ray torpedo is the Royal Navy's lightweight torpedo which is designed to be carried by the anti-submarine helicopters AgustaWestland Merlin and Lynx Wildcat. It has a range of around 5 mi (8.0 km) with a speed of more than 52 mph (84 km/h) and is designed to be used predominantly against submarines. It carries a 45 kg (99 lb) explosive charge which is powerful enough to punch through the double hulls of modern submarines. It is also integrated on board the Type 23 frigates, deployed by two twin torpedo launchers.

== Depth charges ==
The Mk11 Depth Charge is a depth charge used by Lynx Wildcat or Merlin Mk2 helicopters to attack enemy submarines.

== Mine disposal system ==
=== Seafox ===
The Seafox Mine Disposal System is an unmanned underwater vehicle (UUV) used by both the Sandown and Hunt-class minehunters to counter naval mines. The unit incorporates a remotely controlled surveillance system in order to identify a target, guided from the parent ship via fibre optic cables. Once a mine has been identified, an expendable autonomous or remote guided unit is guided to the target and detonates a shaped charge to destroy the mine. Four independent reversible motors and a hover thruster provide high manoeuvrability, allowing for exact placement prior to charge detonation. The Seafox has been used by the Royal Navy clearing coastal waters in both Iraq and Libya conflicts.

== Surface-to-air missiles ==
=== Sea Ceptor ===
The Sea Ceptor missile has been integrated into the Type 23 frigates, as a replacement to the Sea Wolf missile. It has a maximum range over 25 kilometres (16 mi) and can reach Mach 3. The manufacturer states it has a "wide target set", including the capability to engage small naval vessels, which would give the missile a limited surface-to-surface role. A Royal Navy officer of the Type 23 frigate HMS Westminster stated: "Westminster managed to explore the real potential of the system during her training and to say it is a real game changer is an understatement. Unlike its predecessor, the system is capable of defending ships other than Westminster herself. Whether it's engaging multiple air threats or fast incoming attack craft, Sea Ceptor represents a massive capability upgrade for the Type 23 frigate."

In July 2021, it was announced that the anti-air armament of the Type 45 destroyers was to be enhanced with the addition of a 24-cell silo for Sea Ceptor surface-to-air missiles. These were reported as likely to be in lieu of Aster 15 missiles, permitting the 48 Sylver A50 launch cells to be entirely devoted to carrying Aster 30. It was also announced that Eurosam would provide a refresh of the Aster 30 missile systems. All six ships were to be upgraded from 2026 to 2032.

=== Sea Viper ===
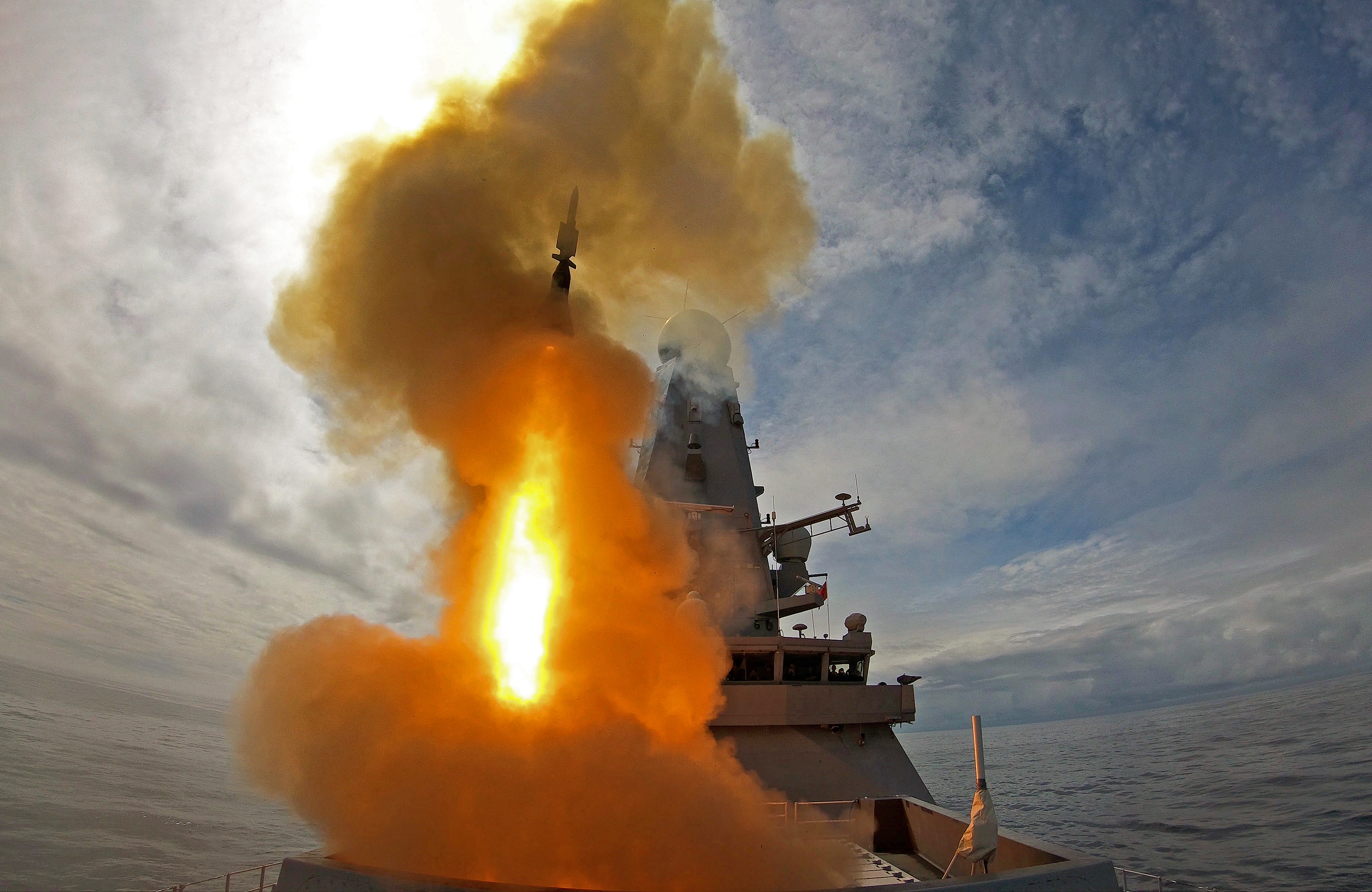
HMS Defender firing an Aster missile.

The Sea Viper is the main weapon of the Type 45 destroyers. As part of PAAMS, it can defend an entire naval task group against aerial threats up to 70 mi (110 km) away.

Internationally, the Sea Viper system is known as Principal Anti-Air Missile System. It comprises the SAMPSON radar, a Combat Management System, S1850M long-range radar, the Sylver vertical launching system and Aster 15 (20 mi, 32 km) and Aster 30 (75 mi, 121 km) missiles, which are highly manoeuvrable and capable of speeds over Mach 4.

== Anti-ship missiles ==
=== Naval Strike Missile ===
In November 2022, UK Secretary of State for Defence, Ben Wallace, confirmed that Norway's Naval Strike Missile would be purchased to equip a total of eleven of the Royal Navy's Type 23 frigates and Type 45 destroyers on an interim basis. Beginning in late 2023, the Naval Strike Missile (NSM) began being fit to a total of 11 Type 23 frigates and Type 45 destroyers in a 2×4 canister configuration to replace the Harpoon Block 1C anti-ship missile, which was formally retired at the end of 2023 (though Harpoon was still retained on HMS Lancaster as of the end of 2024). NSM also has the capability to attack land targets.

The permanent replacement for Harpoon will be Stratus (the Future Cruise/Anti Ship Weapon), first announced in 2016, it will fly at hypersonic speed and was originally expected to equip the new Type 26 frigates from 2028. In October 2021 this was put on hold. Then it was announced in November that the introduction of these weapons may be delayed until the 2030s. An "early 2030s" date for the Stratus missile was finally confirmed in July 2026.

=== Martlet ===
The Martlet is a lightweight air-to-surface, anti-aircraft and surface-to-surface missile developed by Thales Air Defence for the United Kingdom. From 2021, Martlet entered initial service on the Fleet Air Arm's AgustaWestland AW159 Wildcat in the air-to-surface mode with up to twenty Martlet missiles able to be deployed on a single Wildcat helicopter. The missile is intended to counter light fast attack boats though it also incorporates an anti-aircraft capability demonstrating effectiveness against UAVs for example. Full operating capability was achieved in October 2025.

The Martlet has also been tested in the surface-to-surface mode on the Type 23 frigate, using a launcher mounted on the side of the 30 mm cannon, though it has not been deployed by the navy in that capacity.

=== Sea Venom ===
The Sea Venom is a helicopter-launched lightweight anti-ship missile developed by MBDA to replace the Sea Skua. Sea Venom missiles were reported deployed with Royal Navy Wildcat helicopters operating as part of the Royal Navy's carrier strike group in 2021. The missile weighs 110 kg (240 lb) and has a warhead of 30 kg (66 lb). However, operating challenges were reported in 2023 as "ongoing" and full operating capability for Sea Venom was delayed until 2026. In October 2025, Sea Venom finally achieved initial operating capability. It is optimized to attack fast inshore attack craft (FIAC), however it can also damage targets up to corvette size.

== Land attack missiles ==
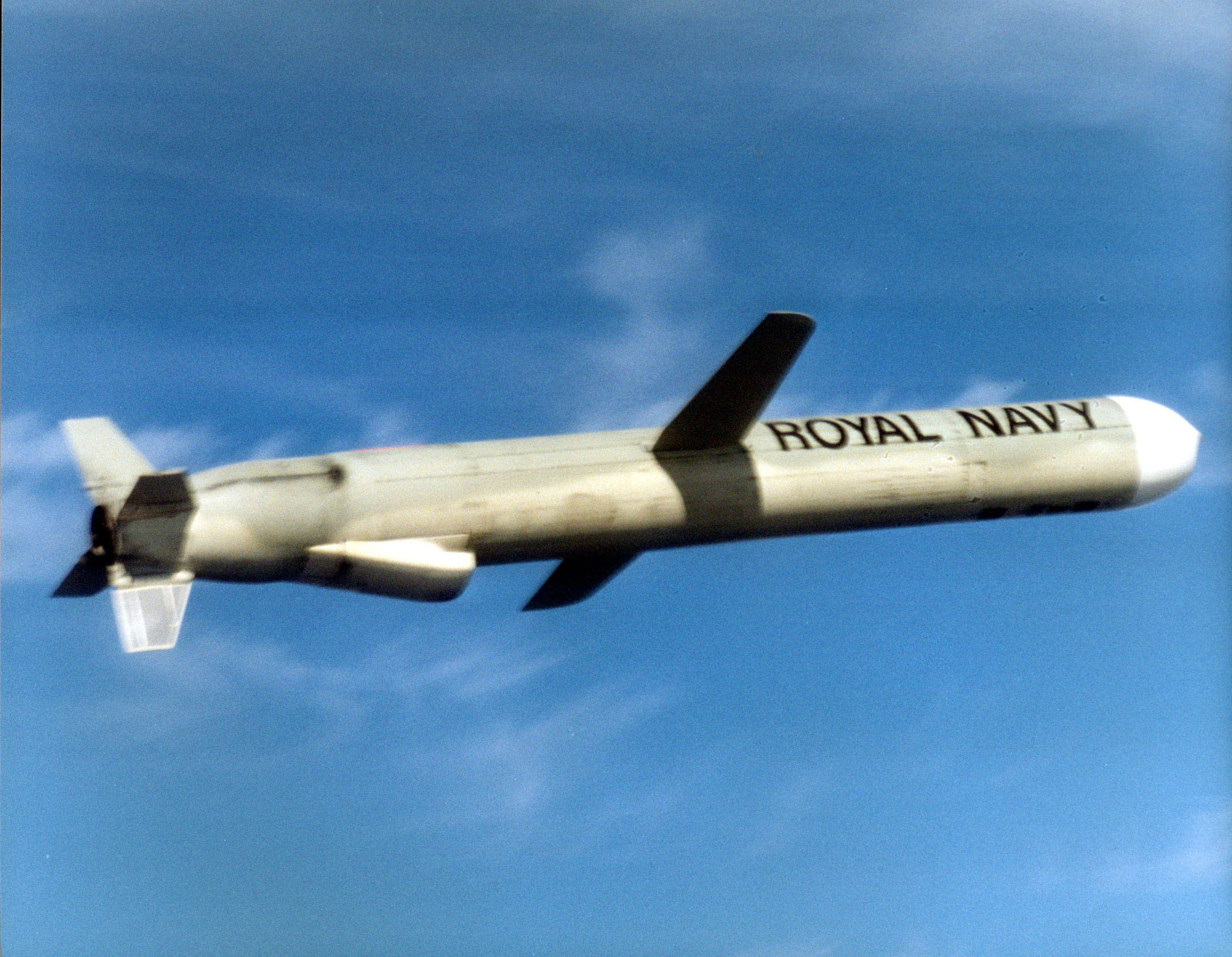
A Royal Navy Tomahawk Land Attack Cruise Missile

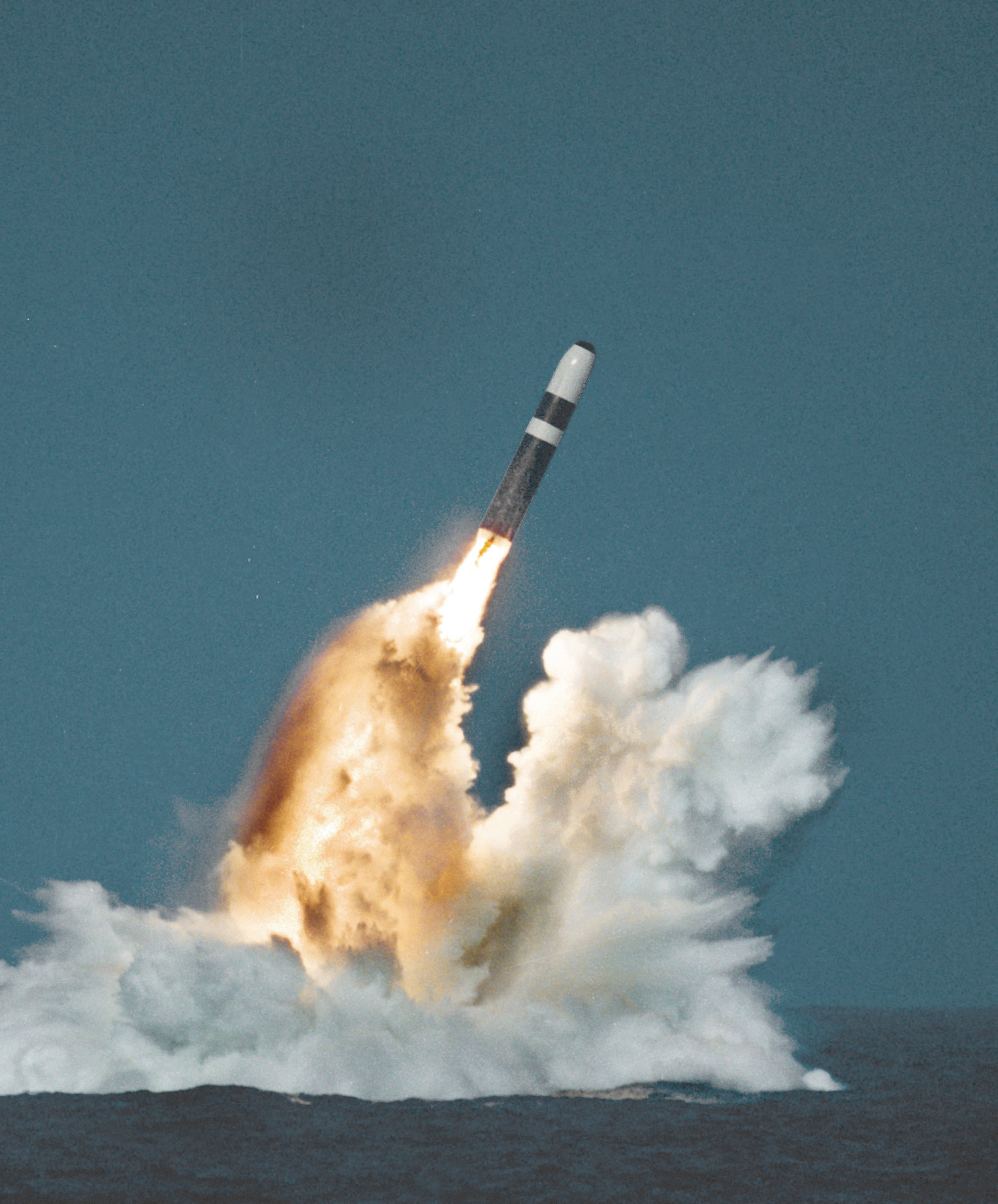
A Trident II Submarine Launched Intercontinental Ballistic Missile

=== Tomahawk missile ===
The Tomahawk missile, also known as TLAM (Tomahawk Land Attack Cruise Missile), allows the Navy's submarines to strike at targets on land accurately. The missile has been in use with the Royal Navy since the late 1990s and has been used in the Kosovo conflict and in the campaigns in the War in Afghanistan and Iraq. It is fired from a boat's torpedo tubes. Once it reaches the surface, a booster rocket ignites to propel the missile skywards. The Tomahawk then heads for its target at 550 mph (890 km/h), delivering a 1,000 lb (450 kg) explosive warhead.

The Tomahawk IV is the latest version of the missile. It has a longer range than its predecessors and can be directed at a new target in-flight, and can also beam back images of the battlefield. In British service it is fitted to all Trafalgar and Astute-class submarines. It is currently planned to be phased out of service in the United States Navy, with no more weapons to be produced after 2015, meaning that it may no longer be an option for the Royal Navy from around the end of the decade. The UK last bought 65 Tomahawk Land Attack Missiles in July 2014.

=== Trident II D5 ballistic missile ===
The Trident nuclear missile is Britain's nuclear deterrent. Carried only by the four Vanguard-class submarines, the missiles travel up to 7,000 miles (11,000 km) at over 13,000 mph (21,000 km/h). Each Vanguard boat can carry up to sixteen missiles, and each missile can deliver up to eight warheads. Each variable yield warhead can have a yield up to 100 kt.

== See also ==
- List of active Royal Navy ships
- List of Royal Navy equipment
