= USS Beagle (IX-112) =

History

United States
- Name: David Rittenhouse; Beagle
- Namesake: David Rittenhouse; The Beagle
- Ordered: as a Type T1-S-C3 hull, MCE hull 1901
- Builder: California Shipbuilding Corporation, Terminal Island, Los Angeles, California
- Laid down: 27 September 1943
- Launched: 29 October 1943
- Commissioned: 20 November 1943
- Decommissioned: 13 June 1946
- Renamed: Beagle, 27 October 1943
- Stricken: 3 July 1946
- Identification: Hull symbol: IX-112; Code letters: NJFL
- Honors and awards: 1 × battle star
- Fate: Returned to MARCOM, 13 June 1946, laid up in the National Defense Reserve Fleet, James River Group, Lee Hall, Virginia; Sold, 14 July 1948

United States
- Name: Edison Skipper
- Owner: Edison Tanker Corporation, Inc., New York City
- Acquired: 14 July 1948
- Fate: Sold, December 1954

Liberia
- Name: George S.; George Sideratos; Maria G.L.
- Acquired: December 1954
- Fate: Scrapped, 1964

General characteristics
- Class & type: Armadillo class tanker
- Type: Type T1-S-C3
- Displacement: 14,500 long tons (14,700 t)
- Length: 441 ft 6 in (134.57 m)
- Beam: 56 ft 11 in (17.35 m)
- Draught: 28 ft 4 in (8.64 m)
- Installed power: 2 × header-type steam boilers; 2,500 shp (1,900 kW)
- Propulsion: 1 × vertical triple-expansion reciprocating steam engine; 1 × propeller
- Speed: 11 kn (20 km/h; 13 mph)
- Complement: 79 officers and men
- Armament: 1 × 5 in (127 mm)/38 caliber dual purpose (DP) gun; 1 × 3 in (76 mm)/50 caliber DP gun; 8 × 20 mm (0.79 in) Oerlikon cannon anti-aircraft gun mounts

USS Beagle (IX-112), was an Armadillo class tanker designated an unclassified miscellaneous vessel. She was the second ship of the United States Navy to be named for the beagle, a breed of small, short-coated hunting hound.

== Construction ==
Her keel was laid down 27 September 1943, under a Maritime Commission (MARCOM) contract, MC hull No. 1901, as the Type T1 tanker David Rittenhouse, by California Shipbuilding Corporation, Terminal Island, Los Angeles, California; launched on 29 October 1943; sponsored by Mrs. Victor Dalton; renamed Beagle and designated IX-111 on 27 October 1943; delivered to the Navy 20 November 1943, and commissioned the same day.

== Service history ==
Following shakedown early in 1944, the tanker moved to the western Pacific. There she transported fuel among the various island groups. Between 13 October and 9 November, Beagle operated in the vicinity of Leyte providing support for the invasion of that island. After that operation, Beagle resumed her more routine fuel supply missions between bases in the Pacific.

== Post-war service ==
After the war ended, she continued those duties in support of American occupation forces in the Far East. The ship headed back to the United States from Eniwetok on 11 March 1946. She transited the Panama Canal on 16 April, and arrived in Norfolk, Virginia, on 30 April. Beagle was decommissioned at Norfolk on 13 June 1946, and was turned over to MARCOM for disposal. Her name was struck from the Navy list on 3 JuIy 1946.

== Merchant service ==
On 14 July 1948, to the Edison Tanker Corporation, Inc., of New York City, the vessel was renamed Edison Skipper. She saw later merchant service under the names George S., Georgios Sideratos, and Maria G.L., before she was scrapped in 1964.

== Awards ==
Beagle earned one battle star for her World War II service.

== Notes ==
Citations

== Bibliography ==
Online resources

- "Beagle II (IX-112)". Dictionary of American Naval Fighting Ships. Naval History and Heritage Command. 24 June 2016. This article incorporates text from this source, which is in the public domain.
- "California Shipbuilding, Los Angeles CA". ShipbuildingHistory.com. 13 October 2010.
- "USS Beagle (IX-112)". NavSource. 21 December 2007.
- "DAVID RITTENHOUSE". United States Department of Transportation. Archived from the original on 12 December 2019.
