= SS Duncan L. Clinch =

World War II Liberty ship of the United States

History

United States
- Name: Duncan L. Clinch
- Namesake: Duncan L. Clinch
- Ordered: as type (EC2-S-C1) hull, MC hull 2378
- Builder: J.A. Jones Construction, Brunswick, Georgia
- Cost: $941.295
- Yard number: 163
- Way number: 5
- Laid down: 22 August 1944
- Launched: 6 October 1944
- Sponsored by: Mrs. Harry B. Vickers
- Completed: 20 October 1944
- Identification: Call Signal: KSZU
- Fate: Struck a mine near Le Havre, France, 23 December 1945; Declared constructive total loss (CTL)

General characteristics
- Class & type: Liberty ship; type EC2-S-C1, standard
- Tonnage: 10,865 LT DWT; 7,176 GRT
- Displacement: 3,380 long tons (3,434 t) (light); 14,245 long tons (14,474 t) (max)
- Length: 441 feet 6 inches (135 m) oa; 416 feet (127 m) pp; 427 feet (130 m) lwl
- Beam: 57 feet (17 m)
- Draft: 27 ft 9.25 in (8.4646 m)
- Installed power: 2 × Oil fired 450 °F (232 °C) boilers, operating at 220 psi (1,500 kPa); 2,500 hp (1,900 kW)
- Propulsion: 1 × triple-expansion steam engine, (manufactured by General Machinery Corp., Hamilton, Ohio); 1 × screw propeller
- Speed: 11.5 knots (21.3 km/h; 13.2 mph)
- Capacity: 562,608 cubic feet (15,931 m^{3}) (grain); 499,573 cubic feet (14,146 m^{3}) (bale)
- Complement: 38–62 USMM; 21–40 USNAG
- Armament: Varied by ship; Bow-mounted 3-inch (76 mm)/50-caliber gun; Stern-mounted 4-inch (102 mm)/50-caliber gun; 2–8 × single 20-millimeter (0.79 in) Oerlikon anti-aircraft (AA) cannons and/or, 2–8 × 37-millimeter (1.46 in) M1 AA guns

SS Duncan L. Clinch was a Liberty ship built in the United States during World War II. She was named after Duncan L. Clinch, an American army officer and commander during the First Seminole War and Second Seminole Wars. He also served in the United States House of Representatives, representing Georgia.

== Construction ==
Duncan L. Clinch was laid down on 22 August 1944, under a United States Maritime Commission (MARCOM) contract, MC hull 2378, by J.A. Jones Construction, Brunswick, Georgia; she was sponsored by Mrs. Harry B. Vickers, and launched on 6 October 1944.

== History ==
She was allocated to American Export Lines, on 20 October 1944. On 23 December 1945, she struck a mine, two miles (3.2 km) west of Le Havre, France, and was declared a constructive total loss (CTL) the same day.

== Bibliography ==
- "Jones Construction, Brunswick GA". ShipbuildingHistory.com. 13 October 2010.
- "Liberty Ships – World War II".
- Maritime Administration. "Duncan L. Clinch". Ship History Database Vessel Status Card. U.S. Department of Transportation, Maritime Administration. Archived from the original on 12 December 2019.
- Davies, James (May 2004). "Specifications (As-Built)" (PDF). p. 23.
- "SS Duncan L. Clinch".
