= USS Laertes =

US Navy Xanthus-class ship

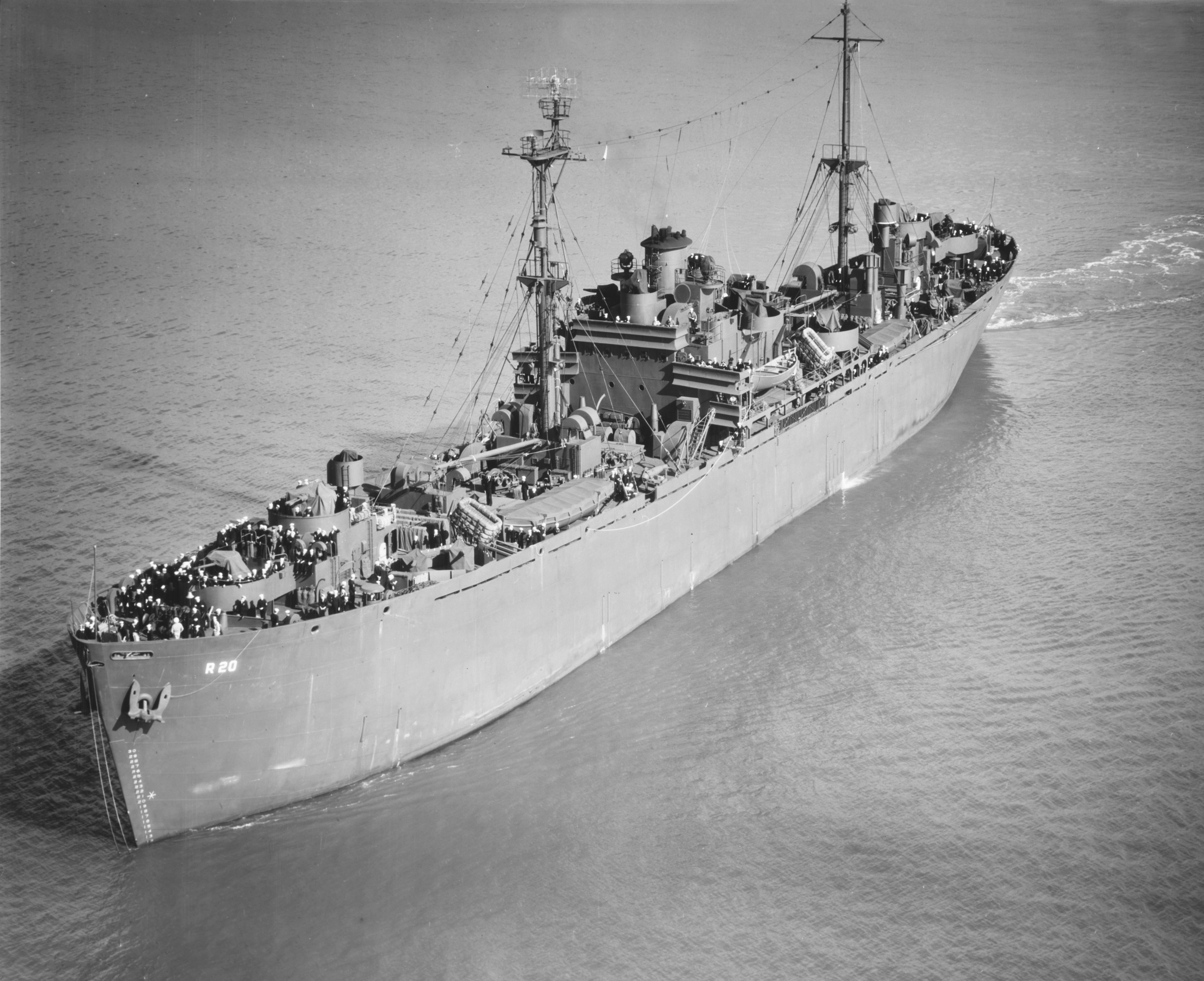
- USS Laertes (AR-20)

History

United States
- Name: Laertes
- Namesake: Laertes
- Builder: Bethlehem-Fairfield Shipyard
- Laid down: 7 August 1944
- Launched: 14 September 1944
- Acquired: 28 September 1944
- Commissioned: 24 March 1945
- Fate: Sold for scrap on 7 July 1972

General characteristics
- Displacement: 5,801 tons
- Length: 441 feet 6 inches
- Beam: 56 feet 11 inches
- Draft: 22 feet
- Propulsion: reciprocating steam engine, single shaft, 2,500 shp
- Speed: 12.5 knots
- Complement: 525
- Armament: one 5"/38 caliber gun; three 3"/50 caliber guns; four 40 mm guns; twelve 20 mm guns

USS Laertes (AR-20) was a Xanthus class repair ship in the service of the United States Navy from 1945 to 1972.

== Construction and commissioning ==
Laertes was originally laid down as the Liberty ship SS Dutiful by Bethlehem-Fairfield Shipyard on 7 August 1944. She was launched on 14 September 1944, sponsored by Mrs. F. A. R. McNab, and acquired by the Navy on 28 September. She was converted into a repair ship by the Maryland Drydock Company of Baltimore, Maryland.. She was completed for the United States Navy as USS Reliance. Intended for transfer to the Royal Navy as HMS Dutiful but she was retained by the United States Navy and renamed Laertes. She was commissioned as USS Laertes (AR-20) on 24 March 1945.

== World War II service ==
Sailing to Norfolk on 31 March, Laertes underwent shakedown before departing on 6 May for the Pacific. Arriving at Pearl Harbor on 6 June, she proceeded on 19 June to Eniwetok, where for almost 4 months she repaired ships damaged during the final battles of the war. In October, she steamed to Okinawa, then sailed for the west coast on 8 November, arriving at Bremerton, Washington on 1 December. She served as a preinactivation repair ship until 17 April 1946 when she steamed to San Diego for similar duty. Laertes decommissioned on 15 January 1947 and entered the Pacific Reserve Fleet.

== Korean War service ==
Laertes recommissioned on 19 December 1951 at San Diego. She operated out of San Diego as a unit of Service Force, Pacific Fleet, until 7 June 1952, when she deployed to the Far East. Steaming via Pearl Harbor, she reached Sasebo, Japan on 10 July for operations with Service Squadron 3. She served in the Far East for more than 5 months, servicing ships of the United States Seventh Fleet at Sasebo and Pusan, Korea, and steaming off the coasts of Japan and Korea.

Departing Sasebo on 3 January 1953, she sailed for San Diego, arriving on 27 January. Laertes deployed to Pearl Harbor from 10 March to 6 June, then steamed to Long Beach, California on 8 July. She returned to San Diego on 1 December.

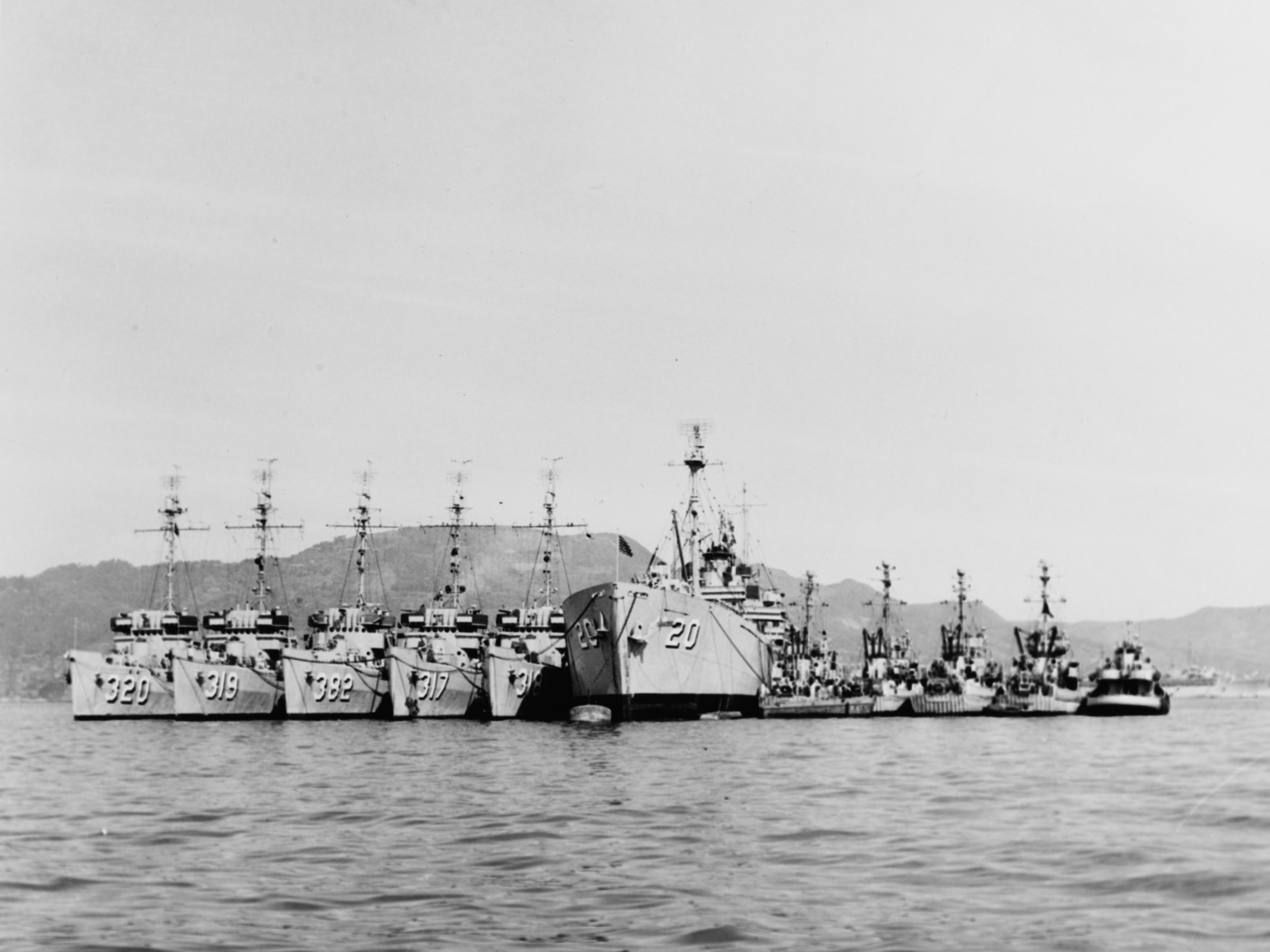
Laertes (AR-20) at Sasebo, Japan with nine minesweepers and a harbor tug alongside, on 8 October 1952.

== Decommissioning and disposal ==
Laertes decommissioned on 26 February 1954, and entered the San Diego Group, Pacific Reserve Fleet. In August 1961 she joined the Maritime Administration Reserve Fleet at Suisun Bay. She was sold to Zidell Explorations, Inc. on 7 July 1972 for scrapping.

== Awards ==
Laertes received two battle stars for service during the Korean War.
