= List of Royal Navy military equipment of the Cold War =

This is a list of Royal Navy military equipment of the Cold War. It is the combat equipment used on Royal Navy ships of this era, including naval artillery, anti-aircraft weapons, radar and other things.

== Naval guns ==
- BL 15-inch Mk I naval gun
- QF 6-inch Mark N5 gun
- QF 5.25-inch naval gun
- QF 4.5-inch Mk I – V naval gun
- 4.5-inch Mark 8 naval gun

== Torpedoes ==
- Tigerfish

== Anti-surface weapons ==
- Sea Skua

== CIWS ==
- Goalkeeper CIWS
- Phalanx CIWS

== Anti-aircraft weapons ==
- Seaslug
- Seacat
- Sea Dart
- Sea Wolf

== Anti-submarine weapons ==
- Limbo
- Ikara
