= USS Xanthus =

Xanthus-class repair ship used by the US Navy

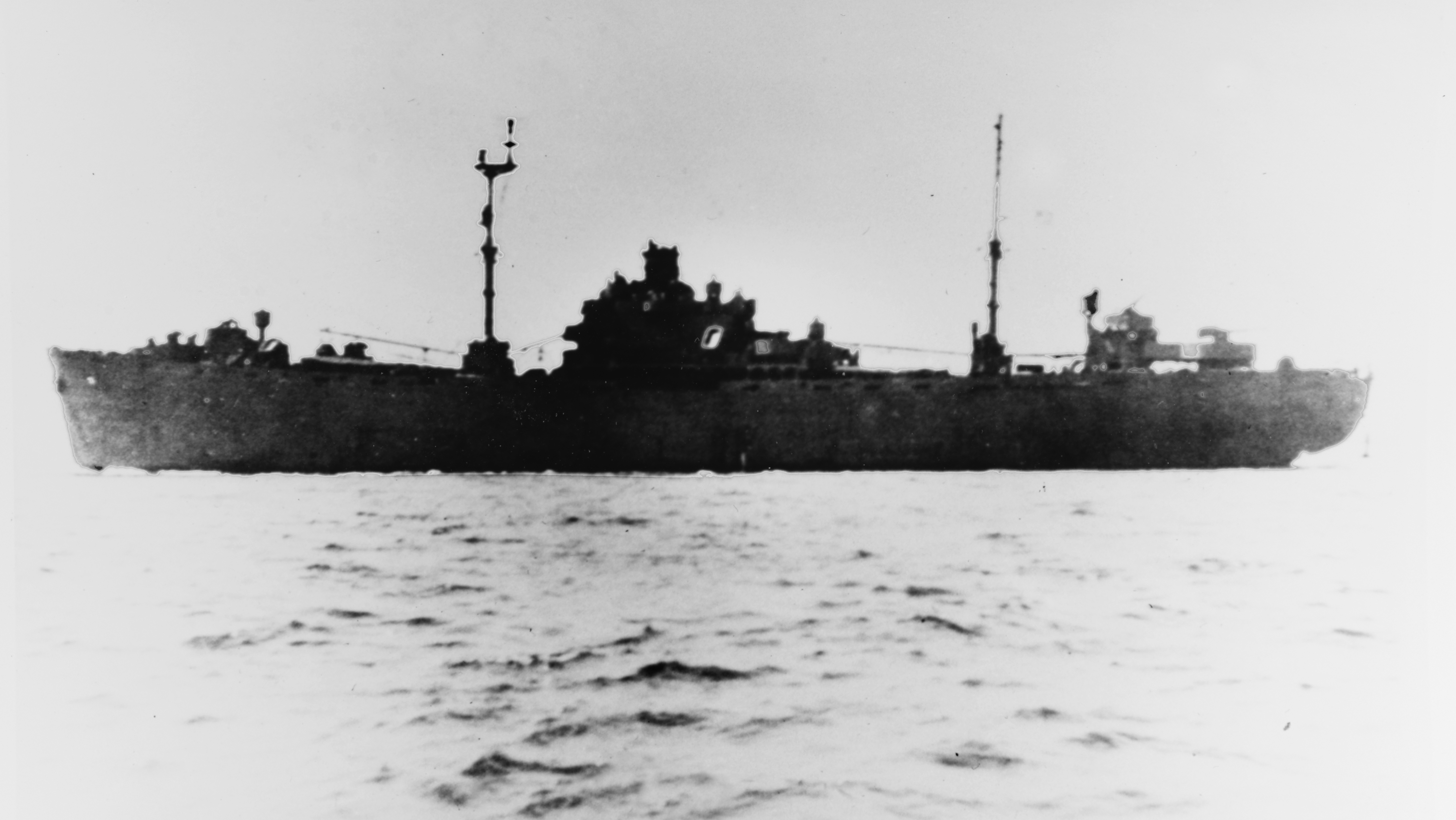
- USS Xanthus at anchor.

History

United States
- Ordered: as Hecla (EC2-S-C1 hull); MCE hull 2664
- Builder: Bethlehem-Fairfield SYs
- Laid down: 6 June 1944
- Launched: 31 July 1944
- Acquired: 16 August 1944
- Commissioned: 9 May 1945
- Decommissioned: 1946
- Stricken: 1 September 1962
- Fate: Sold for scrap, 1974

General characteristics
- Type: MC EC2-S-C1
- Displacement: 5,801 tons(lt), 10,920 tons(fl)
- Length: 441 ft 6 in (134.57 m)
- Beam: 56 ft 11 in (17.35 m)
- Draught: 22 ft 0 in (6.71 m)
- Propulsion: Skinner-uniflow triple expansion reciprocating steam engine, single shaft, 2,500shp. (All pumps were also reciprocating.)
- Speed: 12.5 knots
- Complement: 524 officers and enlisted
- Armament: one 5"/38 gun mount, three 3"/50 gun mounts, two twin 40 mm machine guns, twelve 20 mm machine guns

USS Xanthus (AR-19) was a Xanthus-class repair ship acquired by the United States Navy for the task of providing repairs to the fleet. She was named after Xanthus, a mythical beast of Greek legend.

Intended for the Royal Navy as HMS Hecla (F 175), she was laid down under Maritime Commission contract (MCE hull 2664) as Hecla on 6 June 1944 at Baltimore, Maryland, by the Bethlehem-Fairfield Shipyard, Inc.. She was launched on 31 July 1944, sponsored by Mrs. J.W.A. Waller, and delivered to the Navy on a loan basis on 16 August 1944.

On 6 December 1944, she was renamed Xanthus and designated AR-19. She was commissioned on 9 May 1945.

== World War II operations ==
Following training operations and a transit of the Panama Canal, Xanthus arrived at Pearl Harbor on 20 July to serve there as a repair ship. On 11 August, she sailed for Adak, Alaska, to join forces massing there for the projected assaults on the Kurils and northern Japan. The Japanese capitulation, however, obviated such operations. Instead of an invasion there was now an occupation.

=== End-of-war activity ===
As part of Task Group (TG) 40.2, Xanthus proceeded to Japan and arrived at Ominato on 9 September 1945—the same date that Japanese forces there surrendered to Vice Admiral Frank Jack Fletcher. The ship remained at Ominato through 21 November, serving as flagship for the commander of TG 56.2, the repair and logistics group. Subsequently reporting for duty with Service Squadron 104, the ship operated out of Okinawa through late January 1946.

=== China operations ===
On 10 February 1946, Xanthus sailed for Qingdao, China, and helped to stabilize troubled conditions there in the wake of the Japanese withdrawal. As Communist and Nationalist Chinese jockeyed for position in the volatile situation in their country, Xanthus supported American naval activities in that port until sailing for home on 8 April 1946.

== Return to Stateside ==
Subsequently, arriving at Norfolk, Virginia, in the spring of that year, the repair ship was laid up at the Maritime Commission facility in the James River, Virginia, in an "on hand" status, through 1961.

== Post-war decommissioning ==
On 1 September 1962, the ship was struck from the Navy List. In 1974, Xanthus was sold for scrapping in Cleveland, Ohio.
