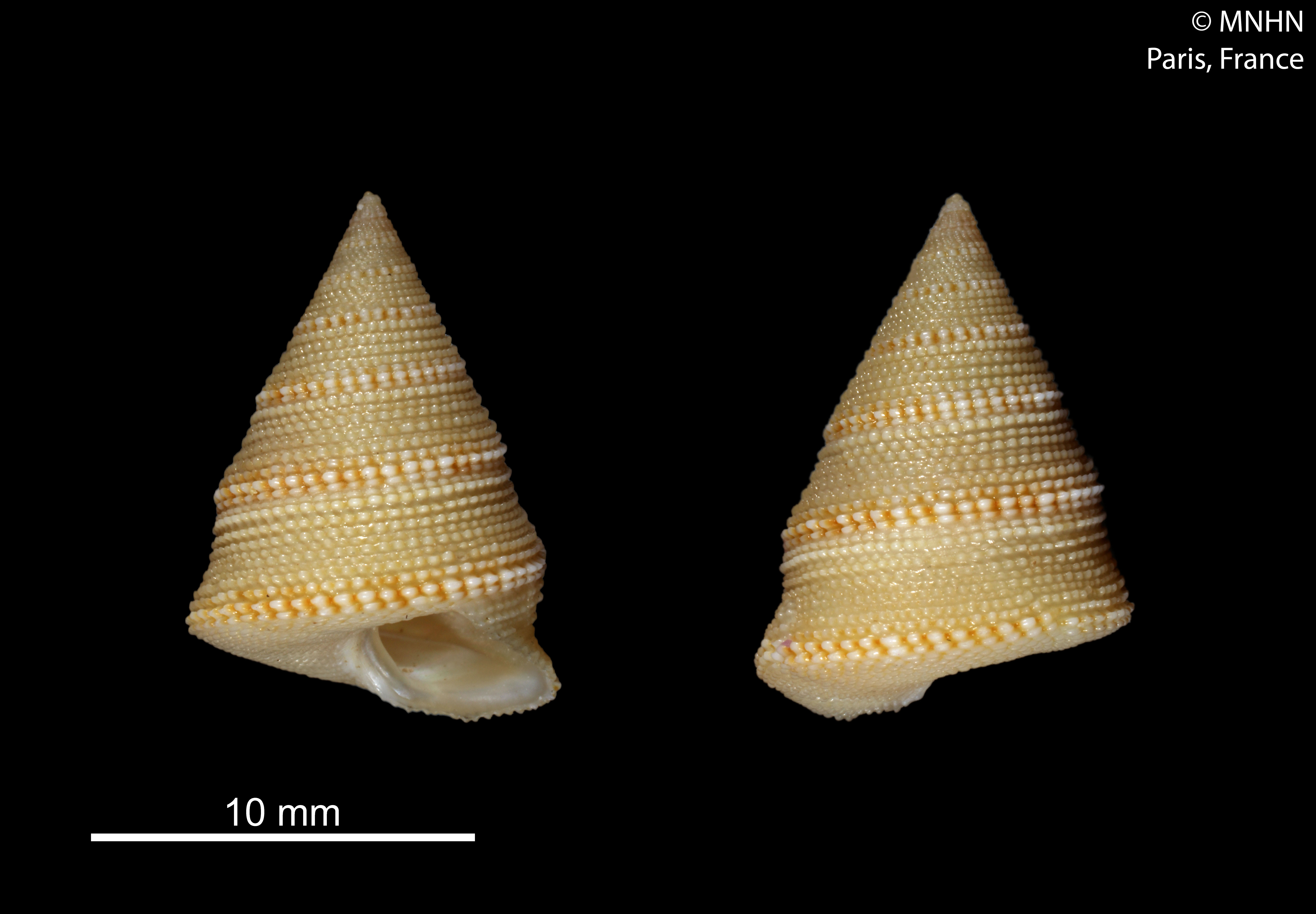
- Shell of Calliostoma xanthos (specimen at MNHN, Paris)

Conservation status
- Naturally Uncommon (NZ TCS)

Scientific classification
- Kingdom: Animalia
- Phylum: Mollusca
- Class: Gastropoda
- Subclass: Vetigastropoda
- Order: Trochida
- Family: Calliostomatidae
- Genus: Calliostoma
- Species: C. xanthos

Binomial name
- Calliostoma xanthos Marshall, 1995

Synonyms
- Calliostoma (Ampullotrochus) xanthos Marshall, 1995

= Calliostoma xanthos =

Species of gastropod

Calliostoma xanthos is a species of sea snail, a marine gastropod mollusc in the family Calliostomatidae.

== Distribution ==
This marine species occurs off the Loyalty Islands, the Kermadec Islands and New Caledonia at depths between 390 m and 490 m.
