= Xanthus (Lesbos) =

Town in ancient Lesbos, Greece

Xanthus or Xanthos (Ancient Greek: Ξάνθος) was a town in ancient Lesbos.

The site of Xanthus is unlocated till now.
