= USS Ara =

Cargo ship of the United States Navy

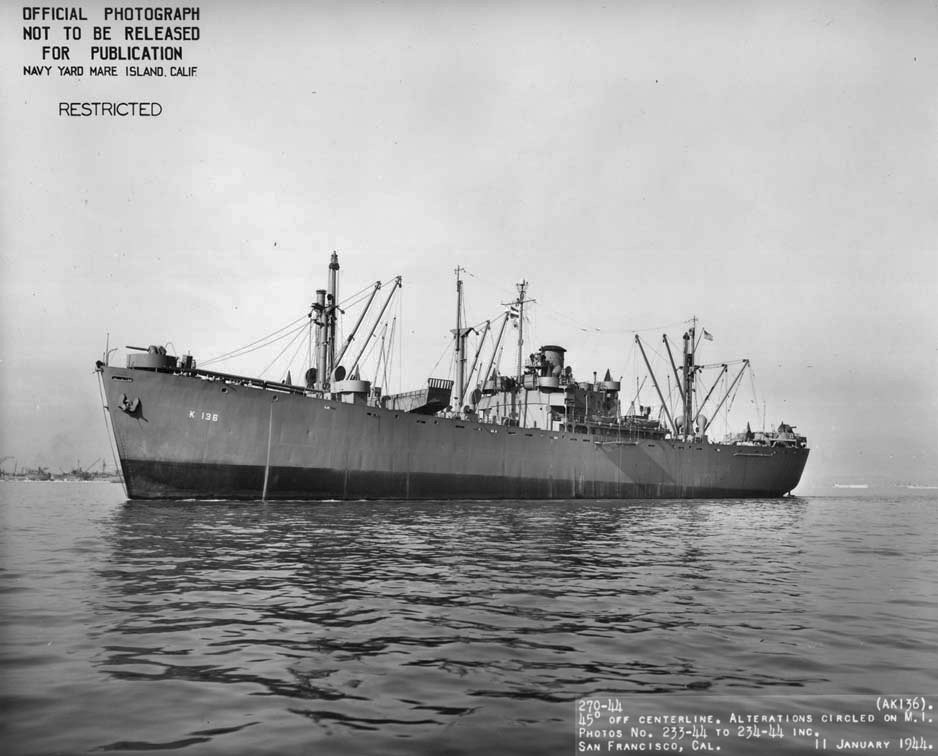
- USS Ara (AK-136), off San Francisco, California, 11 January 1944.

History

United States
- Name: Daniel Boone
- Namesake: Daniel Boone
- Owner: War Shipping Administration (WSA)
- Operator: American-Hawaiian Steamship Company
- Ordered: as a Type EC2-S-C1 hull, MCE hull 69
- Builder: California Shipbuilding Corporation, Terminal Island, Los Angeles, California
- Yard number: 6
- Way number: 6
- Laid down: 17 July 1941
- Launched: 14 January 1942
- Sponsored by: Mrs. J. K. Doolan
- In service: 15 April 1942
- Fate: transferred to the US Navy, 3 December 1943

United States
- Name: Ara
- Namesake: The constellation Ara
- Acquired: 3 December 1943
- Commissioned: 4 January 1944
- Decommissioned: 26 November 1945
- Stricken: 5 December 1945
- Identification: Hull symbol: AK-136; Code letters: NHEN
- Honors and awards: 1 × battle star
- Fate: Sold for scrapping, 26 October 1971, removed, 6 January 1972

General characteristics
- Class & type: Crater-class cargo ship
- Type: Type EC2-S-C1
- Displacement: 4,023 long tons (4,088 t) (standard); 14,550 long tons (14,780 t) (full load)
- Length: 441 ft 6 in (134.57 m)
- Beam: 56 ft 11 in (17.35 m)
- Draft: 28 ft 4 in (8.64 m)
- Installed power: 2 × Babcock & Wilcox header-type boilers, 220psi 450°; 2,500 shp (1,900 kW)
- Propulsion: 1 × General Machine Corp. vertical triple-expansion reciprocating steam engine; 1 × shaft
- Speed: 12.5 kn (23.2 km/h; 14.4 mph)
- Capacity: 7,800 t (7,700 long tons) DWT; 444,206 cu ft (12,578.5 m^{3}) (non-refrigerated)
- Complement: 13 officers 212 enlisted
- Armament: 1 × 5 in (127 mm)/38 caliber dual-purpose (DP) gun; 1 × 3 in (76 mm)/50 caliber DP gun; 2 × 40 mm (1.57 in) Bofors anti-aircraft (AA) gun mounts; 6 × 20 mm (0.79 in) Oerlikon cannon AA gun mounts

USS Ara (AK-136) was a Crater-class cargo ship commissioned by the US Navy for service in World War II. Ara is named after the constellation Ara. She was responsible for delivering troops, goods and equipment to locations in the Asiatic-Pacific Theater.

== Construction ==
Ara was laid down on 17 July 1941, under a Maritime Commission (MARCOM) contract, MC hull No. 69, as the Liberty ship SS Daniel Boone, by California Shipbuilding Corporation, Terminal Island, Los Angeles, California; launched on 14 January 1942; sponsored by Mrs. J. K. Doolan; acquired by the Navy under a bare-boat charter on 3 December 1943; renamed Ara (AK-136); and commissioned on 4 January 1944.

== Service history ==
Ara sailed on 7 February for the Territory of Hawaii. Upon her arrival at Pearl Harbor, the ship reported to Service Squadron 8 for duty. On 4 March, Ara sailed in a convoy bound for the Marshall Islands and discharged her cargo at Majuro and Kwajalein Atolls. Ara left the Marshalls on 14 April; made a brief stop at Pearl Harbor on 28 April; and then the ship got underway for Port Hueneme, California. After loading new cargo, Ara was back in Pearl Harbor on 29 May. The ship sailed on 7 June, with Task Group (TG) 51.6, bound for Eniwetok; anchored there on 18 June; and remained through 23 July.

=== South Pacific ===
On 23 July, Ara was ordered to proceed to Guam to deliver US Army personnel to that island. She remained offshore until 3 August, and then disembarked troops and unloaded equipment. Ara got underway for Eniwetok on 20 August, and arrived four days later. After a reprovisioning period, the transport sailed for Hawaii and moored at Pearl Harbor on 9 September.

=== Supplying Guam and Saipan ===
At Pearl Harbor, she loaded cargo destined for Roi Namur and Majuro and sailed on 19 September, for the Marshalls. From 4 October to 20 November, supplies were discharged and taken on board at Majuro and Kwajalein. On 25 November, the ship headed for Ulithi. Five days later, Ara arrived at the atoll. She sailed again on 8 December, for the Marianas to unload the remainder of her provisions at Guam and Saipan. Ara called at Eniwetok on 23 December, and then continued on to Tarawa. There, she refilled her cargo holds and sailed on 4 January 1945, for Makin Island.

=== Shuttling cargo between island bases ===
During the first two months of 1945, Ara repeated her cargo shuttle services. Her ports of call included Kwajalein, Eniwetok, Ulithi, Guam, Tinian, and Saipan. From Saipan, Ara headed for Hawaii and reached Pearl Harbor on 20 March. Two days later, Ara sailed for San Pedro, Los Angeles, where she arrived on 1 April, for repairs. After successfully completing trials, Ara sailed on 6 May, to Tacoma, Washington, to load cargo and remained there until 23 May, when she began steaming independently for the Philippines.

=== Supplying troops in the Philippines and Saipan ===
Ara began discharging cargo at Samar, Philippines, on 25 June. She then received orders to sail to New Zealand and got underway on 6 July. Ara moored at Auckland on 21 July, and commenced loading supplies earmarked for Marines stationed on Saipan. She departed Auckland on 27 July, and arrived at Saipan on 14 August. The next day, while she was still there, Japan capitulated on 15 August. Ara set a course for the west coast on 21 August, entered San Francisco Bay on 9 September, and began voyage repairs.

== Post-war decommissioning ==
The transport left the west coast on 6 October, bound, via the Panama Canal, for Norfolk, Virginia, and arrived there on 27 October.

She was decommissioned on 26 November, and turned over to the War Shipping Administration (WSA) in whose custody she resumed the name Daniel Boone. The name, Ara, was struck from the Navy List on 5 December. Ara was placed in the MARCOM National Defense Reserve Fleet, and was laid up in the James River, Lee Hall, Virginia.

== Fate ==
On 26 October 1971, she was sold to Hierros Ardes, S.A., of Bilbao, Spain, for $71,520, to be scrapped. She was removed from the fleet 6 January 1972.

== Awards ==
Ara won one battle star for her World War II service. Her crew was eligible for the following medals and campaign ribbons:

- American Campaign Medal
- Asiatic-Pacific Campaign Medal (1)
- World War II Victory Medal
- Philippines Liberation Medal

== Notes ==
Citations

== Bibliography ==
Online resources

- "Ara". Dictionary of American Naval Fighting Ships. Naval History and Heritage Command. 18 June 2015. This article incorporates text from this source, which is in the public domain.
- "California Shipbuilding, Los Angeles CA". ShipbuildingHistory.com. 13 October 2010.
- "USS Ara (AK-136)". NavSource. 16 September 2013.
- "DANIEL BOONE (AK-136)". United States Department of Transportation. Archived from the original on 12 December 2019.
