= USS Dionysus =

1944 Xanthus-class repair ship

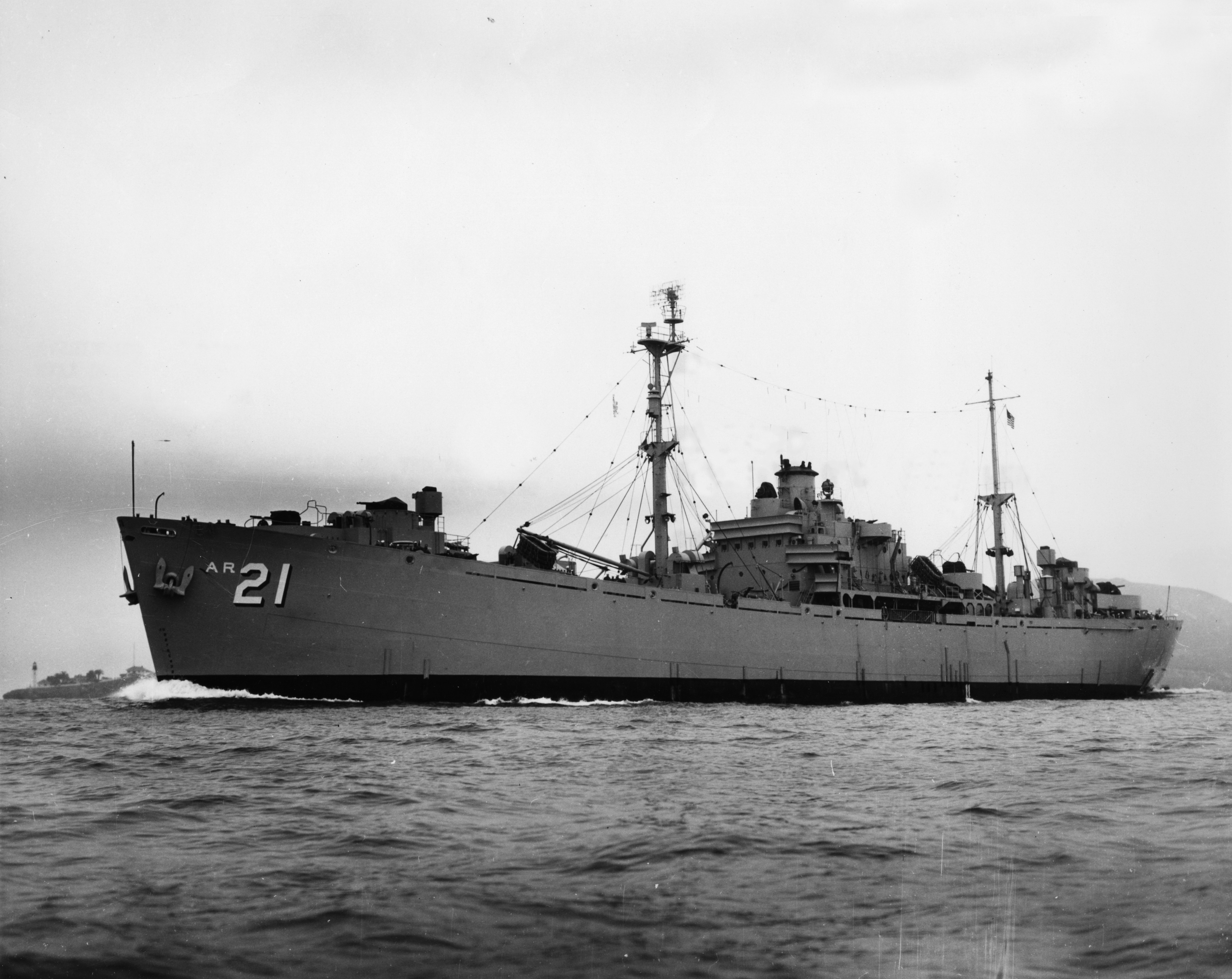
- USS Dionysus (AR-21) underway, c. 1952–1955

History

United States
- Name: USS Dionysus (AR-21)
- Builder: Bethlehem-Fairfield Shipyard
- Launched: 10 October 1944
- Acquired: 25 October 1944
- Commissioned: 28 April 1945
- Fate: Sunk as an artificial reef in 1978

General characteristics
- Class & type: Xanthus-class repair ship
- Displacement: 5,801 tons
- Length: 441 feet 6 inches
- Beam: 56 feet 11 inches
- Draft: 22 feet
- Propulsion: reciprocating steam engine, single shaft, 2,500 shp
- Speed: 12 knots
- Complement: 524
- Armament: one 5 inch gun mount, three 3 inch gun mounts

USS Dionysus (AR-21) was a Xanthus-class repair ship in the service of the United States Navy from 1945 to 1955.

== Construction and commissioning ==
Dionysus was originally launched as the Liberty ship SS Faithful by Bethlehem-Fairfield Shipyard on 10 October 1944, sponsored by Mrs. H. C. McClelland. She was acquired by the Navy on 25 October 1944 and commissioned as USS Dionysus' (AR-21) on 28 April 1945.

== World War II service ==
Dionysus arrived at Pearl Harbor on 30 June 1945. On 13 July she was underway for Eniwetok where she was stationed as repair ship from 24 July to 8 September. Entering Tokyo Bay on 17 September, Dionysus served there until 10 November when she sailed for overhaul at Bremerton, Washington, where she arrived on 28 November. On 30 May 1946 she arrived at San Pedro, where she was placed out of commission in reserve on 31 January 1947.

== Post-war service and decommissioning ==
Recommissioned on 13 February 1952, Dionysus sailed from Long Beach on 8 April to join the Atlantic Fleet. She arrived at Naval Station Norfolk on 29 April and served primarily at this base. An exception was a period in 1953 when she relocated to the Caribbean to repair ships operating from Roosevelt Roads Naval Station, Puerto Rico, ending on 16 April 1954 when she sailed to visit Charleston, South Carolina. She arrived at Newport, Rhode Island on 11 May and continued her repair services there until 3 February 1955. At New York from 4 February to 11 April, she then sailed for Beaumont, Texas, where she was placed in commission in reserve upon her arrival on 20 April. She arrived at Orange, Texas on 25 April and was placed out of commission in reserve there as of 1 July 1955.

Dionysus was withdrawn from the James River Reserve Fleet on 31 May 1978 and designated for use in an artificial reef program in North Carolina.
