= SS Daniel H. Hill =

World War II Liberty ship of the United States

History

United States
- Name: Daniel H. Hill
- Namesake: Daniel Harvey Hill
- Builder: North Carolina Shipbuilding Company, Wilmington, North Carolina
- Yard number: 53
- Way number: 8
- Laid down: 29 November 1942
- Launched: 27 December 1942
- Fate: Scrapped 1964

General characteristics
- Type: Liberty ship
- Tonnage: 7,000 long tons deadweight (DWT)
- Length: 441 ft 6 in (134.57 m)
- Beam: 56 ft 11 in (17.35 m)
- Draft: 27 ft 9 in (8.46 m)
- Propulsion: Two oil-fired boilers; Triple expansion steam engine; Single screw; 2,500 hp (1,864 kW)
- Speed: 11 knots (20 km/h; 13 mph)
- Capacity: 9,140 tons cargo
- Complement: 41
- Armament: 1 × Stern-mounted 4 in (100 mm) deck gun; AA guns

SS Daniel H. Hill (MC contract 875) was a Liberty ship built in the United States during World War II. She was named after Daniel Harvey Hill, a Confederate general who commanded units from North Carolina in the American Civil War.

The ship was laid down by North Carolina Shipbuilding Company in their Cape Fear River yard on November 29, 1942, and launched on December 27, 1942. Hill was chartered to American Export Lines until August 1946 by the War Shipping Administration. From December 1946 until October 1947 she was chartered to Lykes Brothers Steamship Company, who delivered Hill to the Mobile Fleet of the National Defense Reserve Fleet at the end. She was scrapped in 1964.
