= List of support ships of the Royal Navy =

This is a list of support ships of the Royal Navy of the United Kingdom. There are currently no active ships. In World War I, obsolete hulks and cruisers were generally used for maintenance and support. Many commercial vessels were taken up from trade during both wars to act as depot ships. The first ship built specifically for the role was the Medway of 1928. Converted ships below are given with dates of conversion.

== Ships ==
- HMS Hazard (1894) – converted in 1901 into the world's first submarine depot ship
- HMS Sandhurst (1915) – converted from Brocklebank Line steamship Manipur (1906). Variously described as destroyer depot ship and fleet repair ship
- HMS Medway (1928) – submarine depot ship
- HMS Resource (1928) – fleet repair ship
- HMS Woolwich (1934) – destroyer depot ship
- HMS Argenta (1922) – prison ship
- Maidstone-class submarine depot ships
  - HMS Maidstone (1937)
  - HMS Forth (1938)
- Tyne-class destroyer depot ships
  - HMS Tyne (1940)
  - HMS Hecla (1940)
- HMS Adamant (1940) – submarine depot ship
- HMS Vindictive (1940) – ex-training cruiser, destroyer depot ship
- Unicorn (1943) – fleet aircraft maintenance carrier
- HMS Adventure (1944) – ex-minelayer, landing craft repair ship
- UK merchant ship conversions
  - Hull repair type
    - Beauly Firth (1945)
    - Dullisk Cove (1944)
    - Mullion Sound (1945)
    - Solway Firth (1944)
  - Aircraft component repair type
    - Cuillin Sound (1945)
    - Holm Sound (1944)
    - Moray Firth (1945)
- Canadian merchant ship conversions
  - Escort repair type (Beachy Head class)
    - HMS Beachy Head (1945)
    - Berry Head (1945)
    - Duncansby Head (1945)
    - HMS Flamborough Head (1945)
    - Mull of Galloway (1945)
    - Rame Head (1945)
  - Landing craft repair type (Beachy Head class)
    - Buchan Ness (1945)
    - Dungeness (1945)
    - Fife Ness (1945)
    - HMS Girdle Ness (1945) – Sea Slug missile trials ship 1956
    - Dodman Point (1945)
    - Hartland Point (1945)
    - Spurn Point (1945)
  - Coastal forces repair type
    - Cape Wrath (1946)
  - Armaments repair type
    - Portland Bill (1945)
- Colossus-class ex-light fleet carriers
  - HMS Perseus (1944) – fleet aircraft maintenance ship
  - HMS Pioneer (1944) – fleet aircraft maintenance ship
  - HMS Triumph (1964) – fleet repair ship
- HMS Challenger (1984) – seabed operations ship

== See also ==
- List of Royal Fleet Auxiliary ship names
