= HMS Dragon (D35) =

Destroyer of the Royal Navy

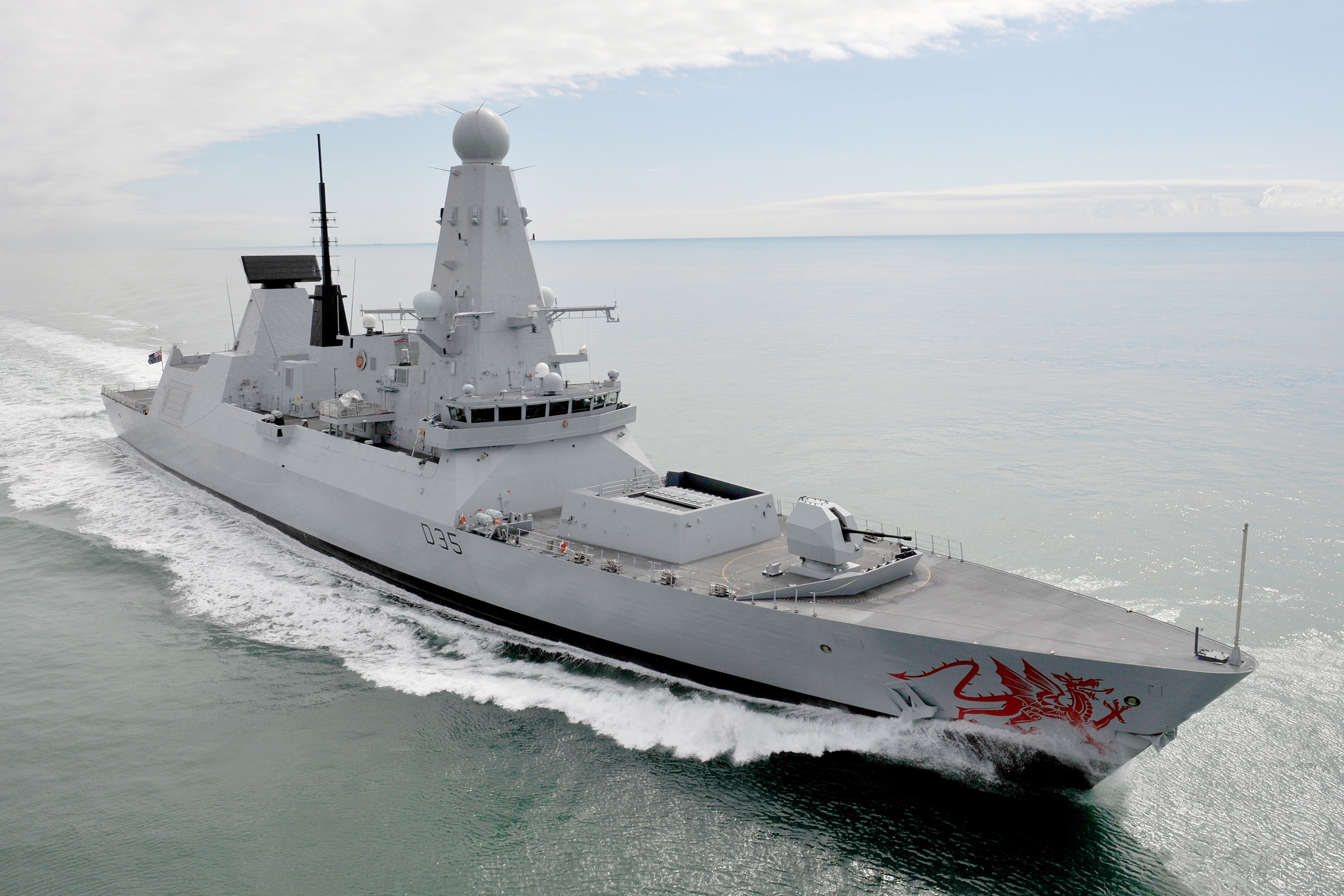
- HMS Dragon in 2011

History

United Kingdom
- Name: Dragon
- Ordered: December 2000
- Builder: BVT Surface Fleet
- Yard number: 1064
- Laid down: 19 December 2005
- Launched: 17 November 2008
- Sponsored by: Mrs. Susie Boissier
- Commissioned: 20 April 2012
- Identification: Pennant number: D35; Deck code: DN; IMO number: 4907866; International call sign: GMIA
- Motto: "We yield but to St George"
- Status: In active service
- Badge

General characteristics
- Class & type: Type 45 guided-missile destroyer
- Displacement: 8,000 to 8,500 t (8,400 long tons; 9,400 short tons)
- Length: 152.4 m (500 ft 0 in)
- Beam: 21.2 m (69 ft 7 in)
- Draught: 7.4 m (24 ft 3 in)
- Installed power: 2 × Rolls-Royce WR-21 gas turbines, 21.5 MW (28,800 shp) each; 2 × Wärtsilä 12V200 diesel generators, 2 MW (2,700 shp) each
- Propulsion: 2 shafts integrated electric propulsion with; 2 × Converteam electric motors, 20 MW (27,000 shp) each
- Speed: In excess of 30 kn (56 km/h; 35 mph)
- Range: In excess of 7,000 nautical miles (13,000 km) at 18 kn (33 km/h)
- Complement: 191 (accommodation for up to 235)
- Sensors & processing systems: SAMPSON multi-function air tracking radar (Type 1045); S1850M 3-D air surveillance radar (Type 1046); Raytheon Integrated Bridge and Navigation System; 2 × Raytheon AHRS INS (MINS 2); 2 × Raytheon I-band Radar (Type 1047); 1 × Raytheon E/F-band Radar (Type 1048); Ultra Electronics Series 2500 Electro-Optical Gun Control System (EOGCS); Ultra Electronics SML Technologies radar tracking system; Ultra Electronics/EDO MFS-7000 sonar
- Electronic warfare & decoys: UAT Mod 2.0 (2.1 planned); AN/SSQ-130 Ship Signal Exploitation Equipment (SSEE) Increment F cryptologic exploitation system; Seagnat; Naval Decoy IDS300; Surface Ship Torpedo Defence
- Armament: Anti-air missiles: PAAMS air-defence system; 48 × Sylver vertical launching system A50 for: Aster 15 missiles (range 1.7–30 km); Aster 30 missiles (range 3–120 km), to be upgraded with a ballistic missile defence capability, called Sea Viper Evolution.; 24 × Sea Ceptor silos to be fitted starting on HMS Defender from 2026 for: 24 × surface-to-air missiles that will replace the Aster 15 missiles to allow all 48 × Sylver vertical launching systems to be used for Aster 30.; Anti-ship missiles: Harpoon Block 1C SSMs, originally fit (retired 2023); to be replaced with Naval Strike Missile in due course); Guns: 1 × 4.5 inch Mark 8 naval gun; 2 × DS30B Mk 1 30 mm guns; 2 × 20 mm Phalanx CIWS; 2 × 7.62 mm Miniguns (replaced by Browning .50 caliber heavy machine guns as of 2023); 6 × 7.62 mm general-purpose machine guns
- Aircraft carried: 1–2 × Lynx Wildcat, armed with: Martlet multirole missiles, or; Sea Venom anti-ship missiles (initial operating capability in October 2025; projected to achieve full operational capability in 2026) or; 2 × anti-submarine torpedoes; or; 1 × Westland Merlin, armed with: 4 × anti-submarine torpedoes
- Aviation facilities: Large flight deck; Enclosed hangar

HMS Dragon is the fourth ship of the Type 45 or Daring-class air-defence destroyers built for the Royal Navy. She was launched in November 2008 and commissioned on 20 April 2012.

== Construction ==
Dragon's construction began at the then BAE Systems Naval Ships (later BAE Systems Surface Fleet Solutions) yard at Scotstoun on the River Clyde in December 2005, and by December 2007 the bow section was in place on the Govan slipway for mating with the other modules. Dragon launched from the slipway at Govan on 17 November 2008 at 3:00 pm. Her sponsor was Mrs Susie Boissier, wife of Vice Admiral Paul Boissier, Deputy Commander-in-Chief Fleet and Chief of Staff. The ship was fitted out at Scotstoun.

== Sea trials ==
Dragon commenced her first set of contractor's sea trials on 5 November 2010.

Dragon entered her home port of Portsmouth for the first time on 31 August 2011.

== Operational service ==
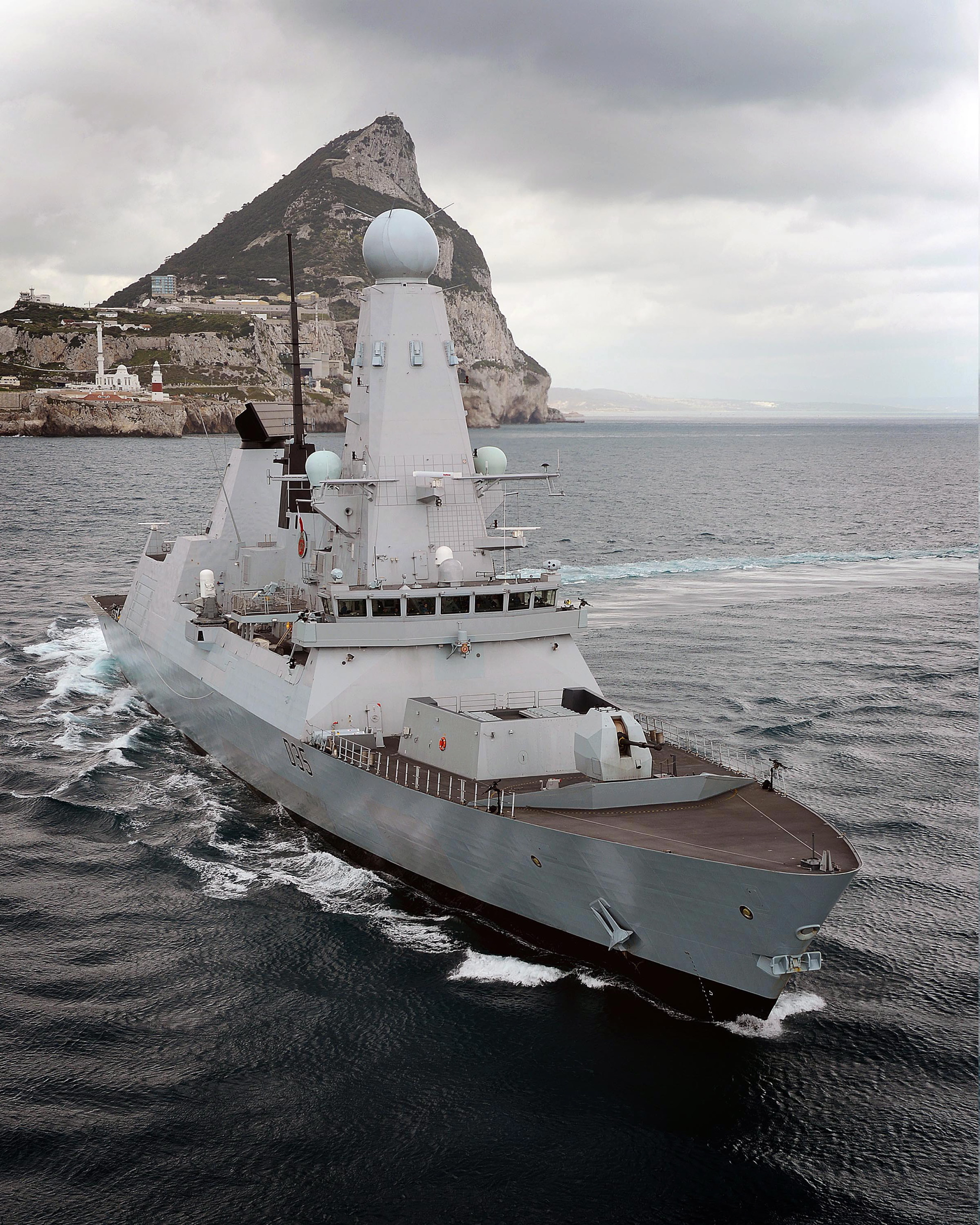
Dragon off Gibraltar in 2013

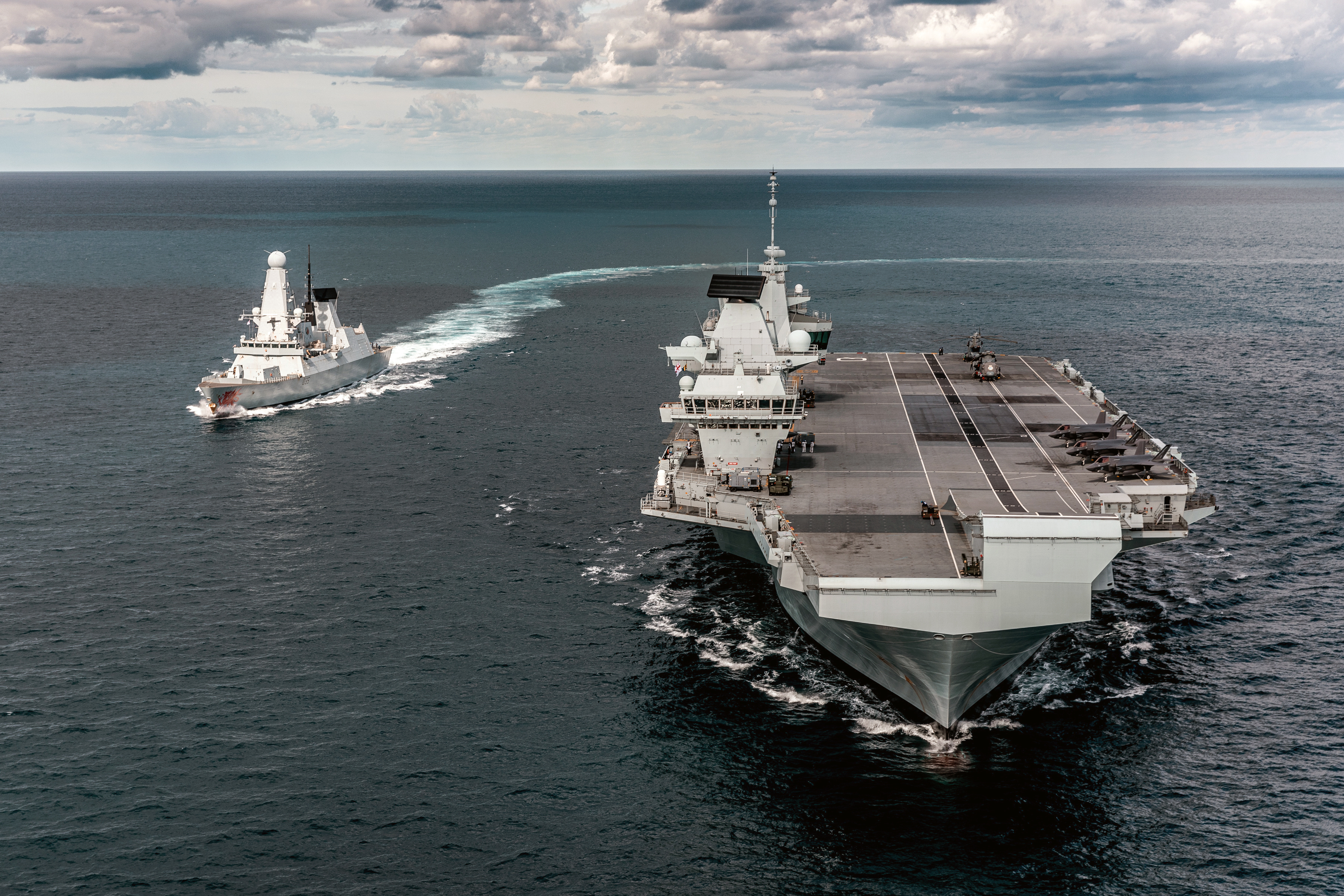
Dragon operating with HMS Queen Elizabeth in 2019

Dragon joined the Royal Navy Surface Fleet on Friday, 20 April 2012. On Friday 27 April, she made her maiden visit to Liverpool, staying for three days. She opened to the public on Saturday 28 April, with visitors able to see the inside of the ship, including the operations room.

In August 2013, it was reported Dragon was sailing with the USS Nimitz carrier group in the Arabian Sea, acting as the main point ship for aircraft control. In August 2013, several Typhoons from No. 6 Squadron RAF were exercising with Dragon and US fighters in the Persian Gulf. It sailed westward to the Eastern Mediterranean.

In April 2014, Dragon was deployed to waters north of Scotland, after sailing from Portsmouth to track the Russian warship Vice-Admiral Kulakov. She was part of the Royal Navy's Atlantic Patrol Tasking in late 2014, visiting places such as the South Georgia Islands, the Falkland Islands, and a transit through the Panama Canal.

In October 2016, Dragon tracked two Russian corvettes in the Atlantic Ocean and Bay of Biscay during a major deployment of Russian naval forces near the United Kingdom.

On 11 February 2017, Dragon rescued the fourteen crew of the dismasted and adrift British yacht Clyde Challenger in the Atlantic Ocean 610 nautical miles (1,130 km) south west of Land's End, Cornwall. Clyde Challenger was subsequently scuttled.

A 26 November 2018 press-release claimed Dragon discovered a suspicious boat while on operation in the Middle East. Sailors and Royal Marines boarded the vessel, and found 148 bags containing 3,048 kg of hashish.

On 15 March 2019, Dragon made its seventh drug seizure, involving 224 kg of heroin from a fishing vessel in the Arabian Sea. During her time in the Arabian Sea, Dragon made eight drug busts and seized over eighteen tons of narcotics, a record for the number of successful busts and the total weight of drugs seized by a Royal Navy ship in the Middle East.

As of March 2019, HMS Montrose took over the Dragon's patrol role in the Persian Gulf.

HMS Dragon set sail in May 2025 to take part in NATO's Formidable Shield; the largest at-sea live-fire exercise in Europe.

On 3 March 2026, Prime Minister Keir Starmer announced that HMS Dragon would be deployed to the eastern Mediterranean to reinforce security around RAF Akrotiri in Cyprus. The deployment followed a Shahed-136 drone strike shortly after midnight on 2 March 2026 that caused minor damage to a hangar during the Iran war. Accompanied by three Wildcat helicopters, armed with Martlet missiles, and a Merlin helicopter that were airlifted separately, the destroyer was tasked with strengthening air defences against drone threats.

HMS Dragon departed Portsmouth for Cyprus on 10 March 2026 after rapid preparations following a period in dry dock, with the crew recalled and the usual six weeks of maintenance, weapons loading, and system checks completed in six days.

=== 2026 Iran conflict ===
Dragon was deployed to the Eastern Mediterranean after rising tensions as a result of strikes on RAF Akrotiri on Cyprus. HMS Dragon was to help "defending Cyprus and the wider Eastern Mediterranean."

As is routine when such ships are deployed, Dragon embarked two AgustaWestland AW159 Wildcat helicopters from 815 Naval Air Squadron. These will be fitted with Martlet Multirole missiles, which were added with the intention of strengthening anti-drone defences in the area. Lockheed Martin F-35 Lightning II fighter aircraft are also in the area and "are already conducting air defence sorties." HMS Dragon was forced to dock shortly after arriving in Cyprus due to what the Ministry of Defence described as a "minor technical issue". The incident occurred amid criticism that the United Kingdom government had responded too slowly to the escalating conflict in the Middle East.

On 9 May 2026 the UK and France announced a plan, where Dragon would be deployed to the Middle East to facilitate shipping through the Strait of Hormuz once a ceasefire is established.

== Characteristics ==
At launch Dragon displayed a red Welsh Dragon on each side of her bow, the only Royal Navy ship to be adorned in this way. The dragons, which had been privately funded, were removed in a 2011 refit and repaint, and restored in 2016, funded by a campaign led by the British Warships Association.

== Affiliations ==
- Cardiff, Wales
- York, England
- Wrexham, Wales
- The Royal Thames Yacht Club
- The Worshipful Company of Plaisterers
- The Welsh Livery Guild
- Royal Navy recognised Sea Scout Groups of Home which are 1st Barry Sea Scouts, 5th Barry Sea Scouts and 6th Barry Sea Scouts RN97
- South Wales District Sea Cadets
- The Dragon School

== In popular culture ==
Dragon appeared in No Time to Die, the 25th film of the James Bond series. The film inaccurately depicts the Type 45's Aster Surface-to-Air missiles as land attack missiles. Shooting for Dragon's role in the film's finale took place off the Faroe Islands in September 2019.
