= HMS Defender (D36) =

2013 Type 45 or Daring-class air-defence destroyer of the Royal Navy

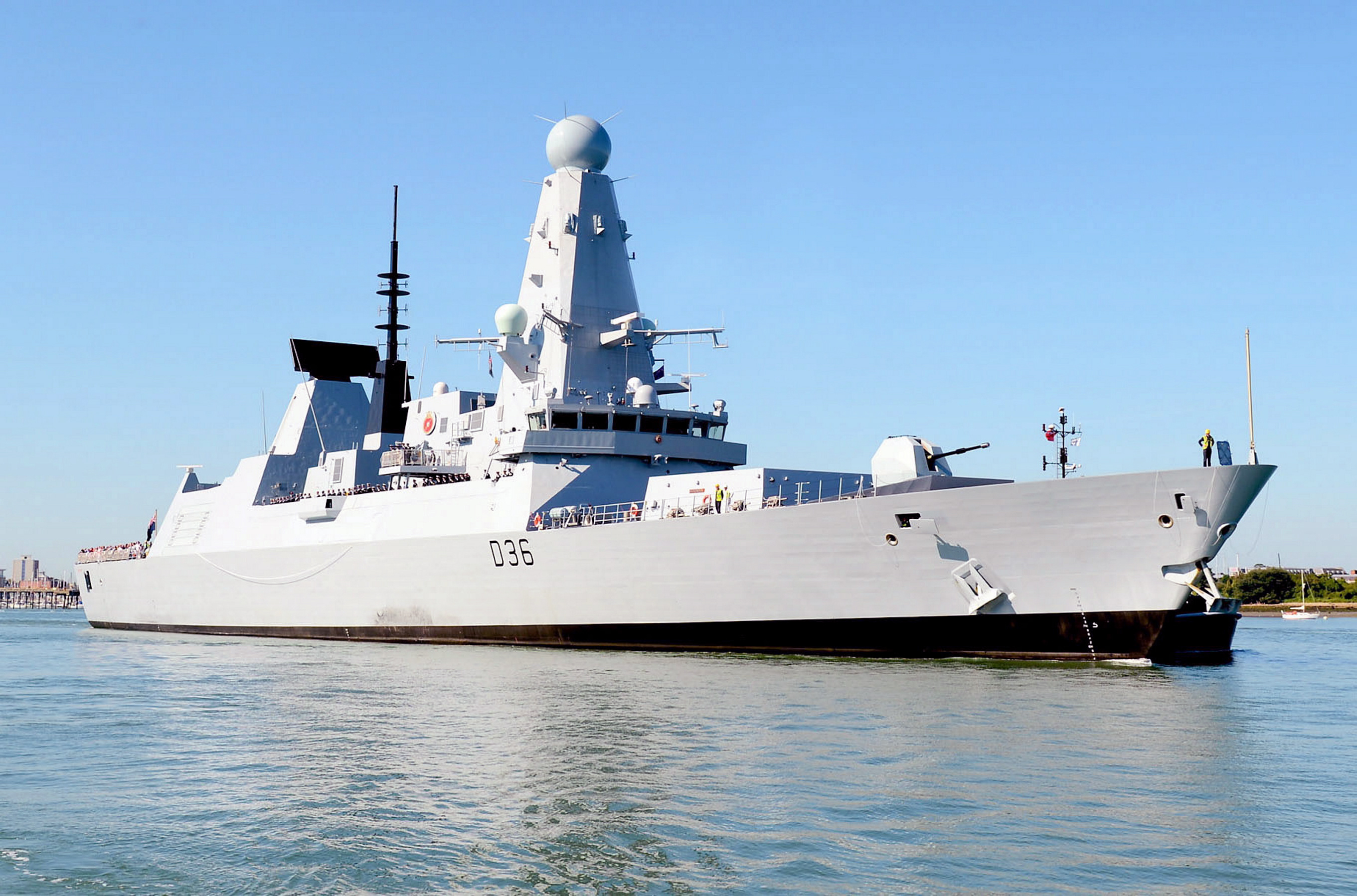
- HMS Defender in 2012

History

United Kingdom
- Name: HMS Defender
- Ordered: December 2000
- Builder: BAE Systems Surface Ships
- Laid down: 31 July 2006
- Launched: 21 October 2009
- Commissioned: 21 March 2013
- Identification: Deck code: DF; Pennant number: D36; International call sign: GMIB; IMO number: 4907878
- Motto: Defendendo vinco; ("By defending I win")
- Status: Undergoing refit
- Badge

General characteristics
- Class & type: Type 45 guided missile destroyer
- Displacement: 8,000 to 8,500 t (8,400 long tons; 9,400 short tons)
- Length: 152.4 m (500 ft 0 in)
- Beam: 21.2 m (69 ft 7 in)
- Draught: 7.4 m (24 ft 3 in)
- Installed power: 2 × Rolls-Royce WR-21 gas turbines, 21.5 MW (28,800 shp) each; 2 × Wärtsilä 12V200 diesel generators, 2 MW (2,700 shp) each
- Propulsion: 2 shafts integrated electric propulsion with; 2 × Converteam electric motors, 20 MW (27,000 shp) each
- Speed: In excess of 30 kn (56 km/h; 35 mph)
- Range: In excess of 7,000 nautical miles (13,000 km) at 18 kn (33 km/h)
- Complement: 191 (accommodation for up to 235)
- Sensors & processing systems: SAMPSON multi-function air tracking radar (Type 1045); S1850M 3-D air surveillance radar (Type 1046); Raytheon Integrated Bridge and Navigation System; 2 × Raytheon AHRS INS (MINS 2); 2 × Raytheon I-band Radar (Type 1047); 1 × Raytheon E/F-band Radar (Type 1048); Ultra Electronics Series 2500 Electro-Optical Gun Control System (EOGCS); Ultra Electronics SML Technologies radar tracking system; Ultra Electronics/EDO MFS-7000 sonar
- Electronic warfare & decoys: UAT Mod 2.0 (2.1 planned); AN/SSQ-130 Ship Signal Exploitation Equipment (SSEE) Increment F cryptologic exploitation system; Seagnat; Naval Decoy IDS300; Surface Ship Torpedo Defence
- Armament: Anti-air missiles: PAAMS air-defence system; 48 × Sylver vertical launching system A50 for: Aster 30 missiles (range 3–120 km), to be upgraded with a ballistic missile defence capability, called Sea Viper Evolution.; 24 × Sea Ceptor SAM (replaces former Aster 15 missiles to allow all 48 × Sylver vertical launching systems to be used for Aster 30); Anti-ship missiles: Harpoon Block 1C SSMs, originally fit (retired 2023); to be replaced with Naval Strike Missile in due course); Guns: 1 × 4.5 inch Mark 8 naval gun; 2 × DS30B Mk 1 30 mm guns; 2 × 20 mm Phalanx CIWS; 2 × 7.62 mm Miniguns (replaced by Browning .50 caliber heavy machine guns as of 2023); 6 × 7.62 mm general purpose machine guns
- Aircraft carried: 1–2 × Lynx Wildcat, armed with: Martlet multirole missiles, or; Sea Venom anti-ship missiles (initial operating capability in October 2025; projected to achieve full operational capability in 2026) or; 2 × anti-submarine torpedoes; or; 1 × Westland Merlin, armed with: 4 × anti-submarine torpedoes
- Aviation facilities: Large flight deck; Enclosed hangar

HMS Defender is the fifth of the Type 45 or Daring-class air-defence destroyers built for the Royal Navy. She is the eighth ship to bear the name. Construction of Defender began in 2006, and she was launched in 2009. The ship completed her first sea trials in October and November 2011, and was commissioned during March 2013.

== Construction ==
Defender's construction began at the BAE Systems Naval Ships (now part of BAE Systems Surface Ships) yard at Govan on the River Clyde in July 2006. The launch date was 21 October 2009.

== Sea trials ==
On 21 October 2011, Defender left Scotstoun shipyard in Glasgow on her maiden voyage exactly two years to the day after she was launched, to conduct her first stage of sea trials. These trials were completed in mid-November. On 9 March 2012, she once again left the Clyde to commence a second round of trials, scheduled to last 28 days in the waters off western Scotland.

== Operational service ==
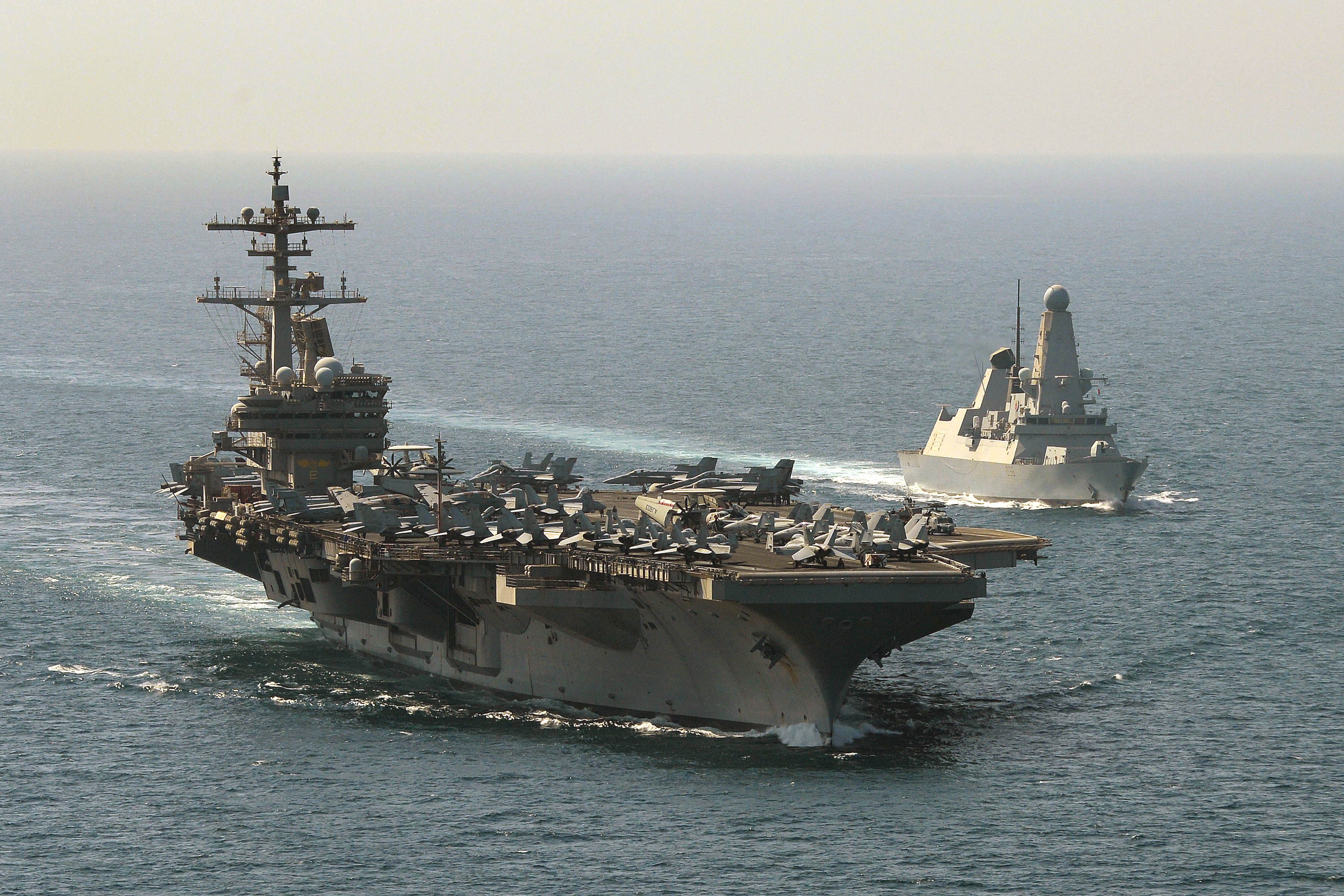
Defender escorting USS George H.W. Bush in the Persian Gulf in 2014

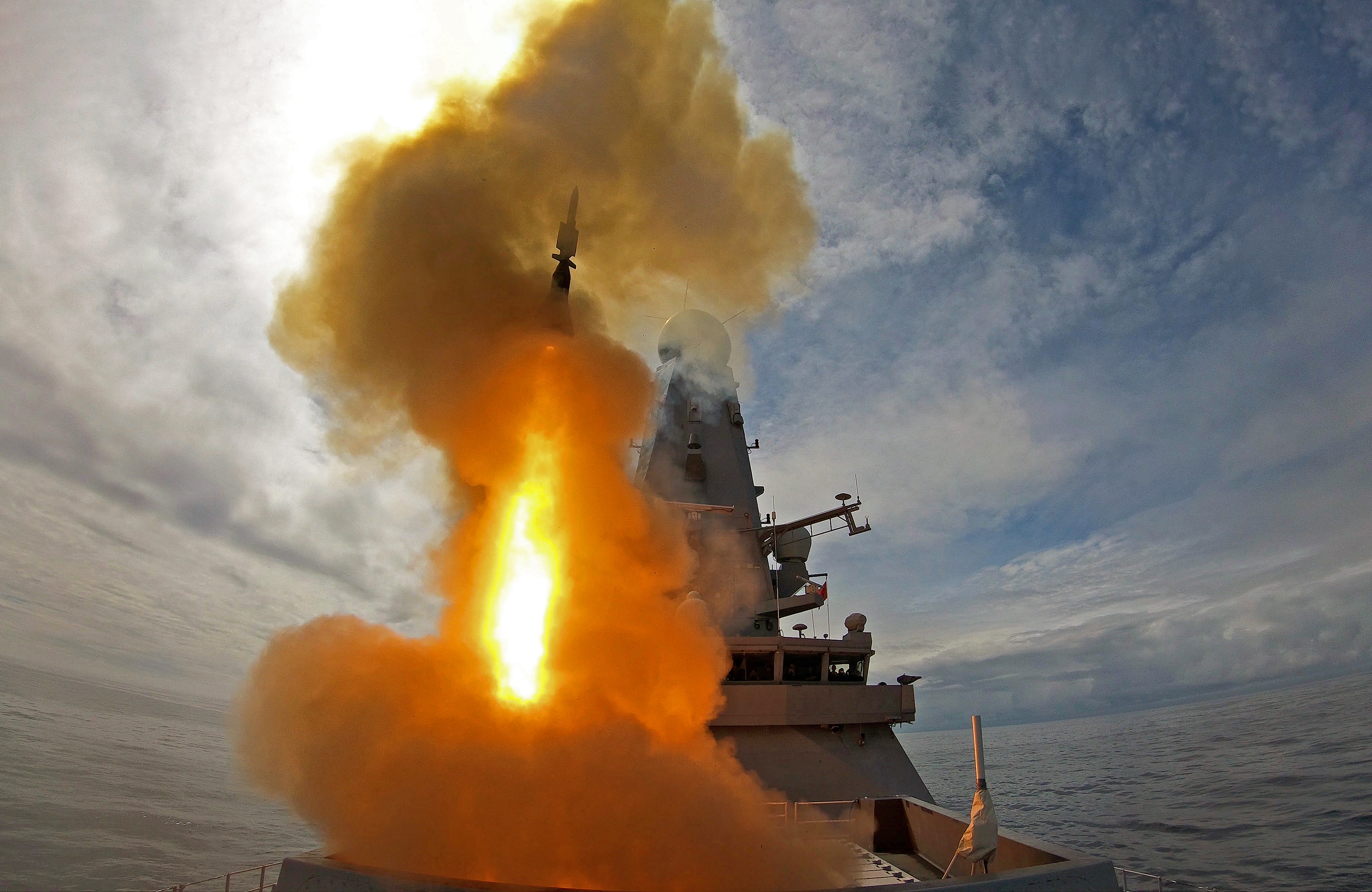
Defender firing an Aster missile during Exercise Formidable Shield.

The ship left Scotstoun on 21 July 2012 on her delivery voyage and entered Portsmouth at 10:00 on 25 July 2012 where BAE Systems and the Royal Navy conducted a formal handover ceremony. At 14:00 that day she raised her White Ensign for the first time as a Royal Naval vessel under the command of Commander Phil Nash. Defender was commissioned on 21 March 2013. She stopped off at her home on the Clyde for final testing and was open to members of the public on Saturday 30 November 2013 before going into active service.

Defender sailed 1,100 kilometres (700 mi) from Portsmouth to the north east of Scotland on 19 December 2013 to meet a Russian task group of six ships including the aircraft carrier Admiral Kuznetsov and escorted them down the east coast of Scotland. The vessels were held back by bad weather and had anchored in the Moray Firth.

Defender was part of Operation Shader, employed as an air defence guard ship for the US Carrier Task Force 50, in 2014.

The ship sailed on 19 October 2015 for a second deployment to the Middle East region. On 18 November, it was announced Defender would deploy alongside France's Charles de Gaulle carrier battle group, deployed off the coast of Syria as an air defence escort. This was in response to France's activation of article 42.7 of the European Union Treaty.

On 27 April 2016, Defender escorted the ocean liner RMS Queen Mary 2 through the Gulf of Oman.

In June 2016, Defender, in conjunction with Australian and French ships, seized a total haul of 1020 kg of hashish from a fishing dhow south of Oman.

Defender returned to active service in early August 2018, after a major 18-month long refit in Portsmouth, in the course of which she was fitted with the Shaman communications electronic support measures (CESM) to be used for the purposes of signals intelligence.

On 12 August 2019, Defender set sail for a deployment in the Asia-Pacific region. On 24 August 2019, HMS Defender was redeployed while on route to the Asia-Pacific region to the Persian Gulf and Strait of Hormuz in order to bolster the British presence and escort British Shipping.

In December 2019, Royal Marines from Defender confiscated 131 kg of crystal meth after searching a dhow in the Arabian Sea. The haul had an estimated total UK street value of £3.3m.

On 23 June 2021, in an account contradicted by the UK government, the Russian military and border guards said they fired warning shots and dropped bombs from a Sukhoi Su-24 attack aircraft in the path of Defender after, according to the Russian Defence Ministry, it had allegedly strayed for about 20 minutes as much as 3 km (2 miles) into waters off the coast of Crimea, declared by Russian Federation as being annexed from Ukraine in 2014 (see 2021 Black Sea incident). The UK military denied any warning shots were fired and said the ship was in innocent passage in Ukraine's territorial sea, later clarifying that heavy guns were fired three miles astern and could not be considered to be warning shots. BBC defence correspondent Jonathan Beale on board the vessel confirmed that the ship went to action stations prior to the transit; the crew put on flash protection in case of live fire; they were warned on the radio that the Russians would fire, and did hear some firing in the distance. On 27 June, it was reported that secret documents relating to the passage of HMS Defender through Ukraine's territorial waters had been discovered at a bus stop in Kent. These documents revealed that the Royal Navy considered different hypothetical reactions from Russia in response to the ship's passage and was prepared for the possibility that Russia might respond in an aggressive manner.

In July 2023, Defender began a three-year refit during which she is to undergo a major power improvement program engine upgrade, integrate the Sea Ceptor air defence missile system and incorporate new (Naval Strike) anti-ship missiles.

== Affiliations ==
- City of Glasgow
- City of Exeter
- Incorporation of Hammermen of Glasgow
