= HMS Duncan (D37) =

2013 Type 45 or Daring-class air-defence destroyer of the Royal Navy

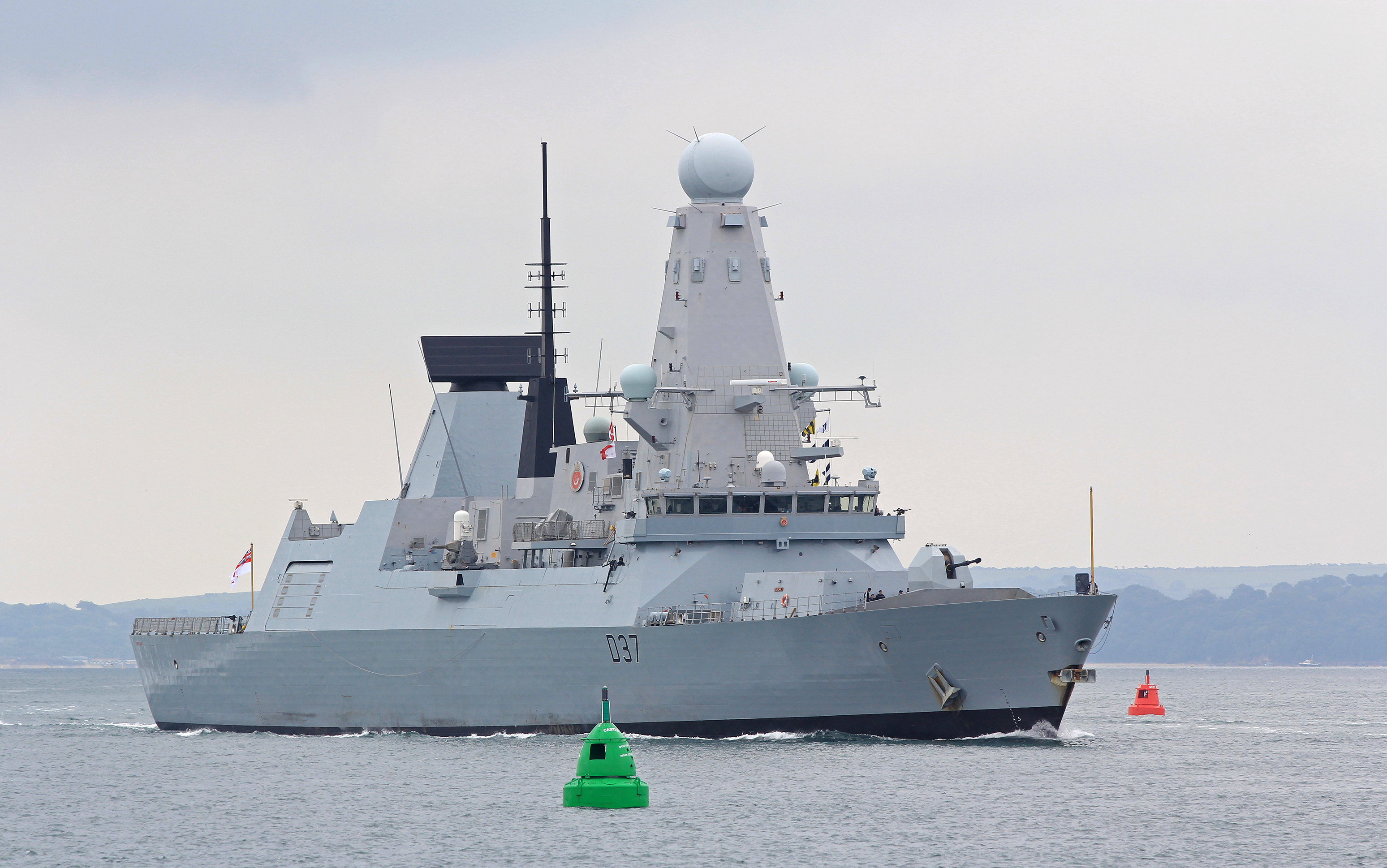
- HMS Duncan in 2016

History

United Kingdom
- Name: HMS Duncan
- Namesake: Adam Duncan, 1st Viscount Duncan
- Ordered: December 2000
- Builder: BAE Systems Surface Ships, Govan, Scotland
- Laid down: 26 January 2007
- Launched: 11 October 2010
- Sponsored by: Mrs Marie Ibbotson
- Commissioned: 26 September 2013
- Identification: Pennant number: D37; IMO number: 4907880; MMSI number: 235053411; International call sign: GMIC; Deck code: DU
- Motto: Secundis dubiisque rectus; ("Upright in prosperity and peril")
- Status: In active service
- Badge

General characteristics
- Class & type: Type 45 guided missile destroyer
- Displacement: 8,000 to 8,500 t (8,400 long tons; 9,400 short tons)
- Length: 152.4 m (500 ft 0 in)
- Beam: 21.2 m (69 ft 7 in)
- Draught: 7.4 m (24 ft 3 in)
- Installed power: 2 × Rolls-Royce WR-21 gas turbines, 21.5 MW (28,800 shp) each; 2 × Wärtsilä 12V200 diesel generators, 2 MW (2,700 shp) each
- Propulsion: 2 shafts integrated electric propulsion with; 2 × Converteam electric motors, 20 MW (27,000 shp) each
- Speed: In excess of 30 kn (56 km/h; 35 mph)
- Range: In excess of 7,000 nautical miles (13,000 km) at 18 kn (33 km/h)
- Complement: 191 (accommodation for up to 235)
- Sensors & processing systems: SAMPSON multi-function air tracking radar (Type 1045); S1850M 3-D air surveillance radar (Type 1046); Raytheon Integrated Bridge and Navigation System; 2 × Raytheon AHRS INS (MINS 2); 2 × Raytheon I-band Radar (Type 1047); 1 × Raytheon E/F-band Radar (Type 1048); Ultra Electronics Series 2500 Electro-Optical Gun Control System (EOGCS); Ultra Electronics SML Technologies radar tracking system; Ultra Electronics/EDO MFS-7000 sonar
- Electronic warfare & decoys: UAT Mod 2.0 (2.1 planned); AN/SSQ-130 Ship Signal Exploitation Equipment (SSEE) Increment F cryptologic exploitation system; Seagnat; Naval Decoy IDS300; Surface Ship Torpedo Defence
- Armament: Anti-air missiles: PAAMS air-defence system; 48 × Sylver vertical launching system A50 for: Aster 15 missiles (range 1.7–30 km); Aster 30 missiles (range 3–120 km), to be upgraded with a ballistic missile defence capability, called Sea Viper Evolution.; 24 × Sea Ceptor silos to be fitted starting on HMS Defender from 2026 for: 24 × surface-to-air missiles that will replace the Aster 15 missiles to allow all 48 × Sylver vertical launching system to be used for Aster 30.; Anti-ship missiles: Harpoon Block 1C SSMs, originally fit (retired 2023); to be replaced with Naval Strike Missile in due course); Guns: 1 × 4.5 inch Mark 8 naval gun; 2 × DS30B Mk 1 30 mm guns; 2 × 20 mm Phalanx CIWS; 2 × 7.62 mm Miniguns (replaced by Browning .50 caliber heavy machine guns as of 2023); 6 × 7.62 mm general purpose machine guns
- Aircraft carried: 1–2 × Lynx Wildcat, armed with: Martlet multirole missiles, or; Sea Venom anti-ship missiles (initial operating capability in October 2025; projected to achieve full operational capability in 2026) or; 2 × antisubmarine torpedoes; or; 1 × Westland Merlin, armed with: 4 × anti-submarine torpedoes
- Aviation facilities: Large flight deck; Enclosed hangar

HMS Duncan, launched in 2010, is the sixth and last of the Type 45 or Daring-class air-defence destroyers built for the Royal Navy. She is named after Admiral Lord Duncan, who defeated the Dutch fleet at the Battle of Camperdown in 1797. The destroyer has served in the Mediterranean, Black, and Caribbean Seas, and in 2019 was deployed to the Persian Gulf in response to increased tensions with Iran in the region. In May 2024, she was deployed to the Red Sea to protect international shipping from Houthi attacks.

== Characteristics ==
In 2014, the Royal Navy website stated that Duncan would be the first Type 45 destroyer to be armed with the Harpoon antiship missile system. On 2 March 2015, Duncan left Portsmouth armed with Harpoon antiship missiles.

== Construction ==
Duncan's construction began at the BAE Systems Naval Ships, later part of BAE Systems Surface Ships yards at Govan and Scotstoun on the River Clyde in 2006. She was launched from Govan on 11 October 2010, on the 213th anniversary of the Battle of Camperdown.

Duncan sailed from Scotstoun shipyard, Glasgow, on 31 August 2012 to commence sea trials.

== Operational service ==
Duncan, the sixth and last Type 45 destroyer, was commissioned on 26 September 2013. She entered service on 30 December 2013, four months ahead of schedule, after a period of trials and training.

On 2 March 2015, Duncan left HMNB Portsmouth on her maiden deployment to the Mediterranean Sea and Middle East. On 7 July 2015, Duncan joined up with the U.S. Navy Carrier Strike Group Twelve to strike the Islamic State of Iraq and the Levant.

In April 2016, HMS Duncan was one of several Royal Navy ships exercising with the French Navy in Exercise Griffin Strike. In October 2016, Duncan, accompanied by the frigate HMS Richmond, was dispatched by the Ministry of Defence to intercept and "man-mark" a fleet of Russian Navy vessels, including their flagship Admiral Kuznetsov, which was passing through the English Channel on its way to Syria. In November, while sailing off the coast of England, Duncan suffered a total propulsion failure and was towed back to Plymouth.

Duncan sailed from Portsmouth in June 2017 to assume the role of flagship of NATO's Standing Maritime Naval Group 2 (SNMG2), operating in the Black Sea and the Mediterranean. Duncan was due to be relieved in September 2017 by HMS Ocean on her final deployment, but Ocean was redeployed to the Caribbean Sea to provide relief to British Overseas Territories in the region in the wake of Hurricane Irma. Duncan was instead relieved by HMS Diamond, which was berthed in Gibraltar en route to the Persian Gulf to relieve HMS Monmouth. Duncan returned to Portsmouth on 22 September 2017.

She resumed NATO duties in January 2018, visiting Mediterranean and Black Sea ports such as Constanța, Souda Bay, and Split, and again took command of SNMG2, returning to Portsmouth on 13 July 2018. In November and December 2018, Duncan featured in the first series of the Channel 5 television documentary Warship: Life at Sea, which captured everyday life on board the vessel during her NATO deployment earlier that year, including confrontations with Russian warships and aircraft, including the Admiral Essen. On the programme, the ship's crew frequently claimed that Duncan can detect a "tennis ball-sized object moving at three times the speed of sound, from over 100 miles away."

In December 2018, Duncan was announced to be affiliated with the town of Scarborough on the Yorkshire coast.

In July 2019, Duncan visited Odesa harbour in Ukraine. On 12 July 2019, she was announced to have been ordered to the Persian Gulf in response to threats against British shipping by Iran, and was due to arrive the following week. She was announced to have arrived in the Gulf on July 28, and was to serve alongside the frigate HMS Montrose there in protecting cargo vessels and oil tankers. This deployment featured in the second series of the Warship: Life at Sea television documentary.

In September 2019, Duncan returned to her home base at Portsmouth for a refit. By July 2021, Duncan's refit was complete and she was back at sea by May 2022.

In February 2023, Duncan joined Orion23, France's largest-ever military exercise, held in the light of the Russian invasion of Ukraine. In March 2023, Duncan was reportedly equipped with Harpoon anti-ship missiles for the first time in several years.

In late June 2023, Duncan departed HMNB Portsmouth for a six-month deployment; the first since she underwent a major overhaul. She became the flagship of Standing NATO Maritime Group 2 in July.

In August 2023, Duncan led a minefield exercise in the Mediterranean.

In May 2024, Duncan deployed for security operations in the Mediterranean in conjunction with US forces and was intended to relieve her sister ship HMS Diamond in the role of protecting international shipping in the face of Houthi attacks in the Red Sea. Events changed her mission and she remained in the Eastern Mediterranean during the Gaza crisis, including serving as air defence escort to USS Wasp. She was visited in Limassol by the UK Defence Secretary. Duncan returned to Portsmouth in early December 2024.

In August 2026, together with HMS St Albans and HMS Severn, Duncan monitored the Russian ships Admiral Levchenko, Neustrashimy, General Skobelev and Sparta as they moved south from the North Sea through the English Channel.

In September 2026, Duncan returned to Portsmouth to undergo an Upgrade Refit. This will include the Power Improvement Project (PIP) of which she is the last of the Type 45 Destroyers to receive this, together with improvements to the ship’s air defence systems.

== Notable incidents ==
In 2020, Seaman Graeme Riddle was knocked overboard into the Mediterranean Sea by an unsecured rope whilst Channel 5 were filming for the documentary Warship: Life at Sea. The man overboard alarm was sounded immediately a search team was sent into the waters to locate Seaman Riddle. After 15 minutes, he was pulled out the water by a ski boat and brought back aboard the ship for medical assessment.

== Affiliations ==
- City of Dundee
- City of Belfast
- Town of Scarborough
- Scots Guards
- No1 (Fighter) Squadron RAF
- Worshipful Company of Cooks
- Worshipful Company of Saddlers
- Friends of Camperdown House
- The Mary Rose Trust
- Northern Ireland Children's Hospice
- Lachlan Goudie (Scottish painter and son of Alexander Goudie)
- City of Duncan, BC and the Royal Naval Association Vancouver Island Branch
- Glenfarclas distillery
- URNU Manchester & Salford
- HMS Hibernia
- TS Duncan Sea Cadet Unit (Dundee)
