= HMS Dauntless (D33) =

2010 Type 45 or Daring-class air-defence destroyer of the Royal Navy

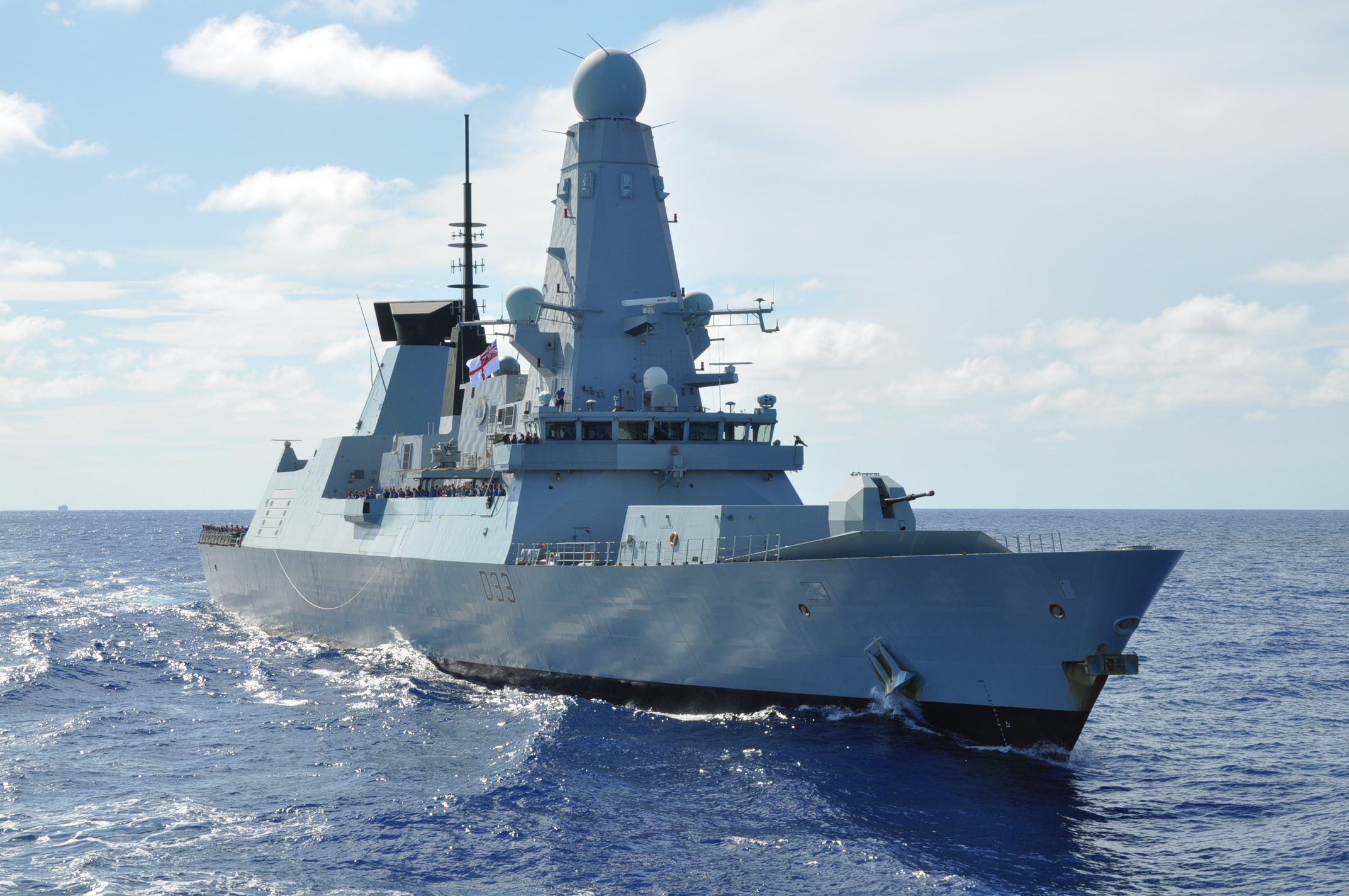
- Dauntless in 2012

History

United Kingdom
- Name: HMS Dauntless
- Namesake: Horatius Cocles
- Ordered: 20 December 2000
- Builder: BAE Systems Surface Fleet Solutions, Govan, Scotland
- Yard number: 1062
- Laid down: 28 August 2004
- Launched: 23 January 2007
- Commissioned: 3 June 2010
- Identification: Deck code: DT; Pennant number: D33; International call sign: GPLB; IMO number: 4907751
- Motto: Nil Desperandum
- Status: In active service
- Badge

General characteristics
- Class & type: Type 45 Guided missile destroyer
- Displacement: 8,000 to 8,500 t (8,400 long tons; 9,400 short tons)
- Length: 152.4 m (500 ft 0 in)
- Beam: 21.2 m (69 ft 7 in)
- Draught: 7.4 m (24 ft 3 in)
- Installed power: 2 × Rolls-Royce WR-21 gas turbines, 21.5 MW (28,800 shp) each; 3 × MTU 4000 series diesel generators, 3 MW (4,000 shp) each
- Propulsion: 2 shafts integrated electric propulsion with; 2 × Converteam electric motors, 20 MW (27,000 shp) each
- Speed: In excess of 30 kn (56 km/h; 35 mph)
- Range: In excess of 7,000 nautical miles (13,000 km) at 18 kn (33 km/h)
- Complement: 191 (accommodation for up to 235)
- Sensors & processing systems: SAMPSON multi-function air tracking radar (Type 1045); S1850M 3-D air surveillance radar (Type 1046); Raytheon Integrated Bridge and Navigation System; 2 × Raytheon AHRS INS (MINS 2); 2 × Raytheon I-band Radar (Type 1047); 1 × Raytheon E/F-band Radar (Type 1048); Ultra Electronics Series 2500 Electro-Optical Gun Control System (EOGCS); Ultra Electronics SML Technologies radar tracking system; Ultra Electronics/EDO MFS-7000 sonar
- Electronic warfare & decoys: UAT Mod 2.0 (2.1 planned); AN/SSQ-130 Ship Signal Exploitation Equipment (SSEE) Increment F cryptologic exploitation system; Seagnat; Naval Decoy IDS300; Surface Ship Torpedo Defence
- Armament: Anti-air missiles: PAAMS air-defence system; 48 × Sylver vertical launching system A50 for: Aster 15 missiles (range 1.7–30 km); Aster 30 missiles (range 3–120 km), to be upgraded with a ballistic missile defence capability, called Sea Viper Evolution.; [24 × Sea Ceptor silos to be fitted starting on HMS Defender from 2026 for: 24 × surface-to-air missiles that will replace the Aster 15 missiles to allow all 48 × Sylver vertical launching systems to be used for Aster 30.]; Undetermined C-UAS system for anti-drone defence deployed on HMS Dauntless as of 2026; Anti-ship missiles: Harpoon Block 1C SSMs, originally fit (retired 2023); to be replaced with Naval Strike Missile in due course; Guns: 1 × 4.5 inch Mark 8 naval gun; 2 × DS30B Mk 1 30 mm guns; 2 × 20 mm Phalanx CIWS; 2 × 7.62 mm Miniguns (replaced by Browning .50 caliber heavy machine guns as of 2023); 6 × 7.62 mm general purpose machine guns
- Aircraft carried: 1× Lynx Wildcat, armed with: Martlet multirole missiles, or; Sea Venom anti-ship missiles (initial operating capability in October 2025; projected to achieve full operational capability in 2026) or; 2 × anti submarine torpedoes; or; 1 × Westland Merlin, armed with: 4 × anti-submarine torpedoes
- Aviation facilities: Large flight deck; Enclosed hangar

HMS Dauntless is the second ship of the Type 45 or Daring-class air-defence destroyers built for the British Royal Navy. She is currently under the command of Commander Ben Dorrington. She was launched at Govan in January 2007, was handed over to the Royal Navy on 3 December 2009 and was formally commissioned on 3 June 2010.

== Construction ==
Dauntless's construction began at the BAE Systems Naval Ships yard at Govan in August 2004 on the River Clyde. She was launched on 23 January 2007 at 3.25 pm by Lady Burnell-Nugent, wife of Admiral Sir James Burnell-Nugent, the then-Commander-in-Chief Fleet. Dauntless is the adopted warship of Newcastle-upon-Tyne. Because her modules were put together outside at BAE Govan, it was possible to complete more of her structure than her sister ship, Daring, which was launched from the covered facility at Scotstoun the previous year.

== Sea trials ==
Upon completing her fitting out stage, HMS Dauntless sailed from the Clyde for the first time on 14 November 2008 to conduct sea trials, testing power and propulsion, weapons and communications systems. Although not yet transferred to the Royal Navy, some of her future crew sailed with her. Dauntless arrived at HMNB Portsmouth for the first time on 2 December 2009, and was formally handed over to the Ministry of Defence by her builders on 3 December 2009. During her sea trials Dauntless made her inaugural visit to her affiliated city of Newcastle upon Tyne in May 2010.

== Operational history ==
Dauntless was commissioned on 3 June 2010 in the presence of her sponsor. The MoD confirmed on 1 October 2010 that she had completed the first Sea Viper firing on a Hebridean firing range earlier in the week, and the ship was accepted into service on 16 November the same year.

In May 2011, Dauntless took part in Exercise Saxon Warrior in the Western Approaches, culminating in a so-called 'Thursday War'.

In June 2011, Dauntless sailed across the Atlantic Ocean to Norfolk, Virginia, to take part in the FRUKUS war game exercises between Russia, France, the United States and the United Kingdom. En route in the Atlantic she rendezvoused and conducted manoeuvres with the Russian destroyer Admiral Chabanenko, which was also heading for the FRUKUS exercises, conducting cross helicopter exercises which saw Dauntless' two Lynx helicopters land on the Admiral Chabanenko. The deployment was the first time that two Lynxs had been deployed aboard a Type 45 destroyer.

In September 2011, Dauntless was the first of the Type 45 destroyers to visit London and berthed opposite London City Airport for the Defence and Security Equipment International event. On 25 November 2011, HMS Dauntless hosted Abdullah Gül, President of the Republic of Turkey.

In January 2012, it was announced that Dauntless would deploy to the South Atlantic to replace HMS Montrose which was stationed around the Falkland Islands. The deployment was condemned by the government of Argentina, which claimed that the deployment represented a "militarization of the South Atlantic", despite the replacement representing only a modest increase in fighting capacity.

Between 2011 and 2012 she was commanded by Captain William Warrender.

In 2015, Dauntless re-sailed for the Middle East after a short delay, with a plan to take part in the centenary of the Gallipoli Campaign. She conducted anti-piracy patrols, as well as provide escort to U.S. Navy aircraft carrier USS Carl Vinson (CVN-70) which is involved in airstrikes against ISIL. In November 2015, she participated with other NATO air defence ships in an "At Sea Demonstration", focusing on anti-ballistic missile warfare.

In April 2016, The Independent stated that the vessel had been relegated to use as a training ship due to manpower and technical shortages, although this was disputed by the MOD at the time. Her status as an engineering training ship pending entering refit was confirmed in June 2016.

In 2019 Dauntless underwent a regeneration refit in Portsmouth before sailing to Birkenhead in May 2020 as the first Type 45 to have new generators fitted under the Power Improvement Project, work undertaken by Cammell Laird, as subcontactor to BAE Systems. She left the shipyard on 14 June 2022 upon completion of the refit, and put to sea for the first time in two years.

In May 2023, the destroyer deployed to the Caribbean for six months, taking over guardship duties there from HMS Medway which had temporarily deployed to the South Atlantic. In September, the destroyer was involved in multiple operations that seized more than a tonne of cocaine from drug smugglers, worth over 200 million pounds. In September, the destroyer also visited the territories of Anguilla, Montserrat and the British Virgin Islands in order to assist local authorities in preparing for the climax of the hurricane season.

The destroyer entered maintenance in 2023/24 and was reported as likely to be the first ship in her class to be fit with the Naval Strike Missile (NSM). On 18 October 2024, she rejoined the fleet after successfully completing her maintenance cycle, though without NSM having been fit to the ship. In 2025, the destroyer joined the Royal Navy's carrier strike group as part of Operation HIGHMAST in a deployment to the Indo-Pacific region.

On 2 October 2026 the ship returned to Portsmouth after a month of sea trials and maintenance. In late 2026, photos revealed that an undetermined C-UAS system for anti-drone defence had been deployed on HMS Dauntless with two 1x2 metre box launchers deployed amidships.

== Affiliations ==
- The City of Newcastle upon Tyne
- The Town of Great Yarmouth and the County of Norfolk
- Adnams Brewery
- The Worshipful Company of Clothworkers
- The Worshipful Company of World Traders
- The Royal Naval Reserve headquarters at HMS Calliope
- The King's Royal Hussars
- No. 51 Squadron RAF
- No. 17 Squadron RAF
- Newcastle United Football Club
- The Percy Hedley Foundation in Forest Hall
- The children's ward of Newcastle General Hospital
- The Caister Lifeboat
- Royal Grammar School, Newcastle
- The Royal Hospital School
- Suffolk & Norfolk District, Sea Cadet Corps
- TS Lord Nelson, Norwich Sea Cadets (257)
- TS Orwell, Ipswich Sea Cadets
- TS Landguard, Felixstowe Sea Cadets
- TS St Edmund, Bury St Edmunds Sea Cadets
- TS Brave, Beccles Sea Cadets
- TS Norfolk, Great Yarmouth Sea Cadets
- TS Europa, Lowestoft Sea Cadets
- TS Vancouver, King's Lynn Sea Cadets
- TS Dauntless, Gosforth Sea Cadets (396)
- TS Dauntless, Maritime Cadets
