= Type 45 destroyer =

2009 Royal Navy destroyer class

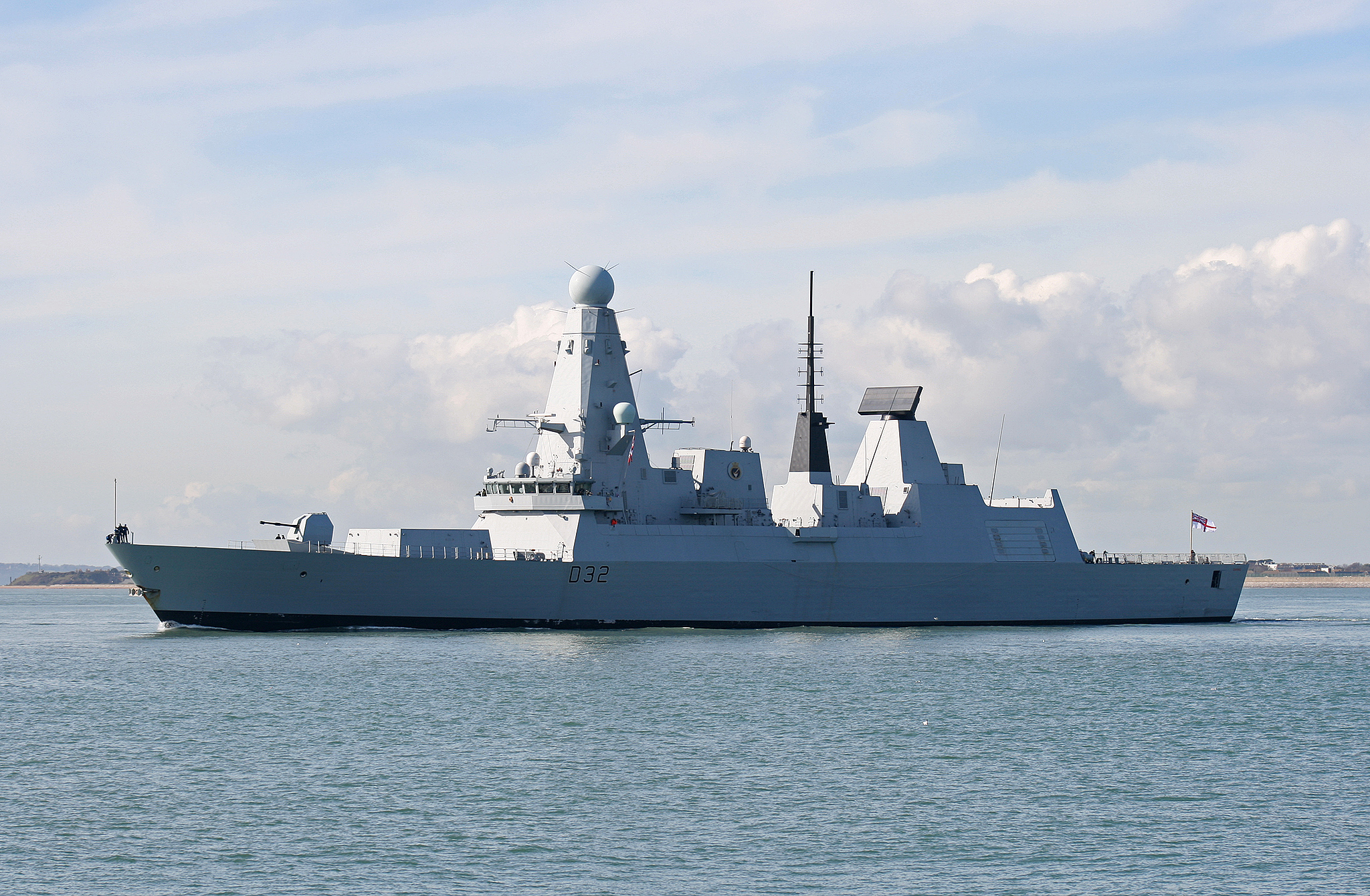
- HMS Daring departing Portsmouth Naval Base, 1 March 2010

Class overview
- Name: Type 45 destroyer
- Builders: BAE Systems Maritime – Naval Ships
- Operators: Royal Navy
- Preceded by: Type 42
- Succeeded by: Type 83 (cancelled)
- Cost: Over £1.050 billion per ship incl. research, development and weapons, £650 million per ship excl. R&D
- Built: 2003–2012
- Planned: 12 (2000), 8 (2004), 6 (ordered) (Note: Six hulls were originally ordered, with a planning assumption that a further six would be ordered between 2005 and 2010. This planning assumption was later reduced to a further two. In the 2008 defence budget, the Global Combat Ship programme (known then as the FSC) was brought forward at the expense of ships 7 and 8, resulting in the final order being left at six, with options for further ships not being taken up.)
- Completed: 6
- Active: 6 (2 of which are ongoing modernisations)

General characteristics
- Type: Guided-missile destroyer
- Displacement: 7,350 to 8,500 tonnes (8,400 long tons; 9,400 short tons)
- Length: 152.4 m (500 ft)
- Beam: 21.2 m (69 ft 7 in)
- Draught: 7.4 m (24 ft 3 in)
- Installed power: 2 × Rolls-Royce WR-21 gas turbines, 21.5 MW (28,800 shp) each, and: 2 × Wärtsilä 12V200 diesel generators, 2 MW (2,700 shp) each, or: 3 × MTU 4000 series diesel generators, 3 MW (4,000 shp) each
- Propulsion: 2 shafts integrated electric propulsion with; 2 × GE Power Conversion Advanced Induction Motors and VDM25000 Drives, 20 MW (27,000 shp) each
- Speed: In excess of 30 kn (56 km/h; 35 mph)
- Range: In excess of 7,000 nautical miles (13,000 km; 8,000 mi) at 18 kn (33 km/h; 21 mph)
- Complement: 191 (accommodation for up to 285)
- Sensors & processing systems: SAMPSON multi-function air tracking radar (Type 1045); S1850M 3-D air surveillance radar (Type 1046); Raytheon Integrated Bridge and Navigation System; 2 × Raytheon AHRS INS (MINS 2); 2 × Raytheon I-band Radar (Type 1047); 1 × Raytheon E/F-band Radar (Type 1048); Ultra Electronics Series 2500 Electro-Optical Gun Control System (EOGCS); Ultra Electronics SML Technologies radar tracking system; Ultra Electronics/EDO MFS-7000 sonar
- Electronic warfare & decoys: UAT Mod 2.0 (2.1 planned); AN/SSQ-130 Ship Signal Exploitation Equipment (SSEE) Increment F cryptologic exploitation system; Seagnat (to be replaced by SEA Ancilia decoy launcher system under contract awarded in 2024); Naval Decoy IDS300; Surface Ship Torpedo Defence
- Armament: Anti-air missiles: PAAMS air-defence system; 48 × Sylver vertical launching system A50 for: Aster 15 missiles (range 1.7–30 km); Aster 30 missiles (range 3–120 km), to be upgraded with a ballistic missile defence capability, called Sea Viper Evolution.; 24 × Sea Ceptor silos to be fitted starting on HMS Defender from 2026 for: 24 × surface-to-air missiles that will replace the Aster 15 missiles to allow all 48 × Sylver vertical launching systems to be used for Aster 30].; Anti-ship missiles: Harpoon Block 1C SSMs, originally fit (retired 2023); to be replaced with Naval Strike Missile in due course; Guns: 1 × 4.5-inch Mark 8 naval gun; 2 × DS30B Mk 1 30 mm guns; 2 × 20 mm Phalanx CIWS; 2 × 7.62 mm Miniguns (replaced by Browning .50 caliber heavy machine guns as of 2023); 6 × 7.62 mm general purpose machine guns; Anti-drone CIWS: C-UAS system for anti-drone defence (only confirmed on HMS Dauntless as of 2026); Planned: [2 x DragonFire laser-based directed energy weapon (DEW): to be fit to at least two ships of the class starting in 2027]
- Armour: Kevlar splinter protection, 70 mm magazine/VLS
- Aircraft carried: 1 or 2 × Wildcat HMA2, armed with: 4 × Sea Venom anti-ship missiles (initial operating capability from October 2025; full operating capability projected from 2026), or; 2 × Sting Ray anti-submarine torpedoes, or; 20 × Martlet multirole missiles (from 2021); Mk 11 depth charges; or; 1 × Merlin HM2, armed with: 4 × Sting Ray anti submarine torpedoes
- Aviation facilities: Chinook capable flight deck; Enclosed hangar

The Type 45 destroyer, also known as the D or Daring class, is a class of six guided-missile destroyers built for the United Kingdom's Royal Navy in the early 21st century. The class is primarily designed for anti-aircraft and anti-missile warfare and is built around the PAAMS (Sea Viper) air-defence system using the SAMPSON Active electronically scanned array (AESA) and the S1850M long-range radars. The first three destroyers were assembled by BAE Systems Surface Fleet Solutions from partially prefabricated "blocks" built at different shipyards; the remaining three were built by BAE Systems Maritime – Naval Ships. The first ship in the Daring class, HMS Daring, was launched on 1 February 2006 and commissioned on 23 July 2009. It is the last destroyer class made for the Royal Navy.

The Type 45 destroyers were built to replace the Type 42 (Sheffield-class) destroyers that had served during the Falklands War, with the last Type 42 being decommissioned in 2013. The National Audit Office reported that, during an "intensive attack", a single Type 45 could simultaneously track, engage and destroy more targets than five Type 42 destroyers operating together. After the launch of Daring on 1 February 2006, Admiral Sir Alan West, then First Sea Lord, stated that it would be the Royal Navy's most capable destroyer ever, as well as the world's best air-defence ship. The reduction in the number to be procured from twelve, then to (up to) eight, finally with only six confirmed (in 2008) was controversial.

In 2016, it was revealed that due to a design flaw on the Northrop Grumman intercooler attached to the Rolls-Royce WR-21 gas turbines, power availability was diminished considerably when functioning in the warm climate of the Persian Gulf, and it quickly became apparent that the class was not operating as originally envisioned. Therefore, a planned refit was scheduled from 2019 to 2021 to fully resolve the problems with the six ships in the class.

Under the previous plans, the Type 45 destroyer were planned to be replaced by the Type 83 destroyer, the first of which was expected to enter service in the late 2030s.

== Development ==
The UK had sought to procure a new class of air-defence guided-missile destroyers in collaboration with seven other NATO nations under the NFR-90 project; the project collapsed due to varying requirements of the different countries involved. The UK then joined France and Italy in the Horizon-class frigate programme; however, differing national requirements, workshare arguments and delays led to the UK withdrawing on 26 April 1999 and starting its own national project. On 23 November 1999, Marconi Electronic Systems (MES), the defence arm of General Electric and in the process of merger with British Aerospace (BAe) since January, was confirmed as the prime contractor for the Type 45 project. Seven days later, MES and BAe completed the merger forming BAE Systems (BAE), making the latter the prime contractor.

The Type 45 project has been criticised for rising costs and delays, with the six ships costing £6.46 billion, an increase of £1.5 billion (29%) on the original budget. The first ship entered service in 2010, rather than 2007 as initially planned. In 2007, the Defence Select Committee expressed disappointment that the Ministry of Defence (MoD) and BAE had failed to control rising costs.

=== Construction ===
The Type 45 destroyers take advantage of Horizon development work and use the Sea Viper air-defence system and the SAMPSON radar. The ships were built by BAE Systems Maritime – Naval Ships, which subsequently became BVT Surface Fleet with the merger of the surface shipbuilding arms of BAE Systems and VT Group. These two companies had previously built the ships in collaboration. BAE's two Glasgow shipyards and single Portsmouth shipyard were responsible for different "blocks". BAE's Govan yard built Block A (stern to the edge of the helicopter hangar). The Scotstoun yard built Blocks B/C (a 2600-tonne section that contains the Rolls-Royce WR-21 gas turbines, starting with the helicopter hangar to the bridge section) and Block D (the bridge section itself). BAE's Portsmouth shipyard was responsible for Blocks E/F (bridge to the bow), funnels, and masts. For ships two to six, blocks A–D were assembled in the Ships Block and Outfit Hall of the Govan shipyard and taken fully outfitted to the Scotstoun berth. The masts and funnels were also fitted before launch.

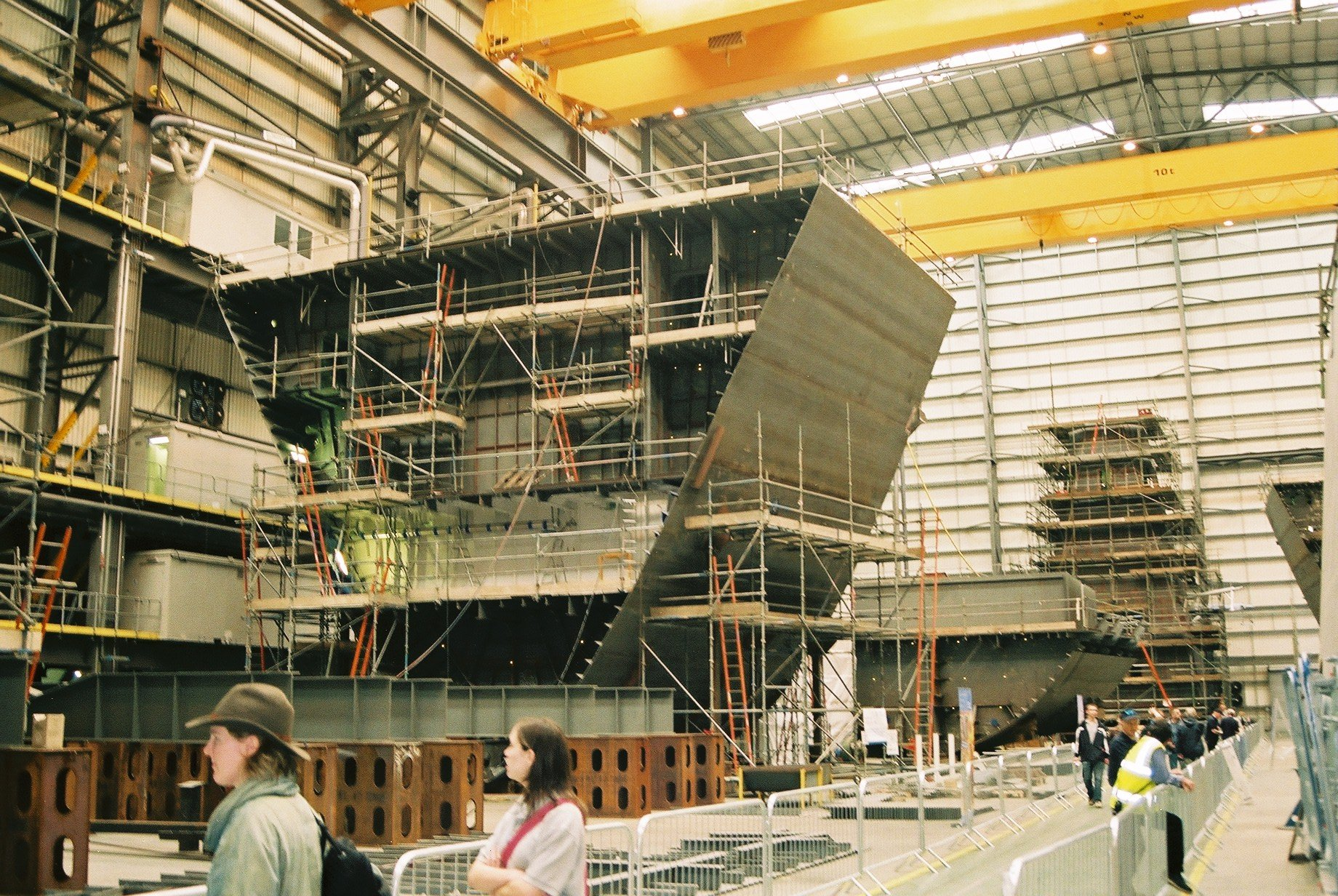
Construction of blocks of Dauntless at Portsmouth

For the first-of-class, Block A was assembled at Govan and moved to Scotstoun, where it was mated to Block B/C, which was already fitted with the WR-21 turbines and machinery. Block D, also assembled at Scotstoun, was fitted to these three blocks. The bow sections (E/F) were mated at HMNB Portsmouth and taken by barge to Scotstoun. These were the final blocks to be attached. At this point, the hull was launched into the Clyde and towed to the Scotstoun Dry Dock, where the masts and funnels were fitted (the masts were partially outfitted with equipment. For example, the mast for the S1850M radar is sent from Portsmouth to Thales Nederland to be fitted with radar equipment). Once this was complete, the remaining equipment was fitted: radar arrays, bow-mounted sonar, propellers, missile equipment, and the 4.5-inch gun.

This modular construction arrangement was agreed upon in February 2002. However, when the original contract for three ships was signed in July 2000, BAE Systems Marine was to build the first and third ships, and VT Group was to build the second.

By the end of 2010, all six Type 45 destroyers had been launched, with the first two in commission and the remainder fitting out. By 2012, all destroyers were structurally complete and the production lines had been closed. Duncan, the last of the Type 45 destroyers, was commissioned at Portsmouth Naval Base on 26 September 2013 and entered service in 2014 after trials and training.

The Daring class are the largest escorts ever built for the Royal Navy in terms of displacement. (Note: Largest in terms of displacement; however, the 6,200-ton County-class destroyers were some 6 metres (20 ft) longer, and the 6,300-ton Type 82 destroyer was 2 metres (6.6 ft) longer.)

In 2009, delivery of the ships' Aster missiles was delayed due to a manufacturing fault with a single batch of missiles identified during testing.

== Characteristics ==
=== General specifications ===
The Type 45 destroyers are 152.4 m (500 ft 0 in) in length, with a beam of 21.2 m (69 ft 7 in), a draught of 7.4 m (24 ft 3 in) and a displacement of approximately 7,350 tonnes (7,230 long tons). This makes them significantly larger than the Type 42 they replaced (displacement 5,200 tonnes, 5,100 long tons, 5,700 short tons). The Type 45 destroyers are the first British warships built to meet the Lloyd's Register's Naval Ship Rules for hull structure requiring design approval by Lloyd's Register for the principal structural arrangements of the vessel. BAE Systems is the Design Authority for the Type 45, a role traditionally held by the Ministry of Defence. The design of the Type 45 brings new levels of radar signature reduction to the Royal Navy. Deck equipment and life rafts are concealed behind the ship's superstructure panels, producing a "clean" superstructure. The mast is also sparingly equipped externally. Speculation by the press suggests that this design gives the ship the radar cross-section of a small fishing boat.

The Daring class is notable for being the first Royal Navy vessels to include gender-neutral living spaces to accommodate male and female crew members; communal shower and heads facilities have given way to individual cubicles, and six-person berths for junior ratings are far more flexible in accommodating a mixture of male and female sailors. Men and women will continue to sleep in separate spaces, in common with most other navies.

=== Propulsion and power ===
The Type 45 is fitted with an advanced and innovative integrated electric propulsion system. Integrated electric propulsion seeks to supply all propulsion and the ship's electrical load using alternating current at a high quality of voltage and frequency. (Note: High quality indicates that the frequency and voltage are stable, with an absence of spikes, even under changes in power demand.) This is achieved by computerised control, high-quality transformation, and electrical filtering. Two Rolls-Royce WR-21 gas turbines drive GE alternators, and along with two Wärtsilä 12V200 diesel generators, provide electrical power at 4,160 volts to a GE high voltage system. The high voltage supply is then used to power two GE Power Conversion advanced induction motors with outputs of 20 MW (27,000 hp) each. Ship's services, including hotel load and weapons system power supplies, are supplied via transformers from the high voltage supply at 440 V and 115 V. The benefits of integrated electric propulsion are cited as:

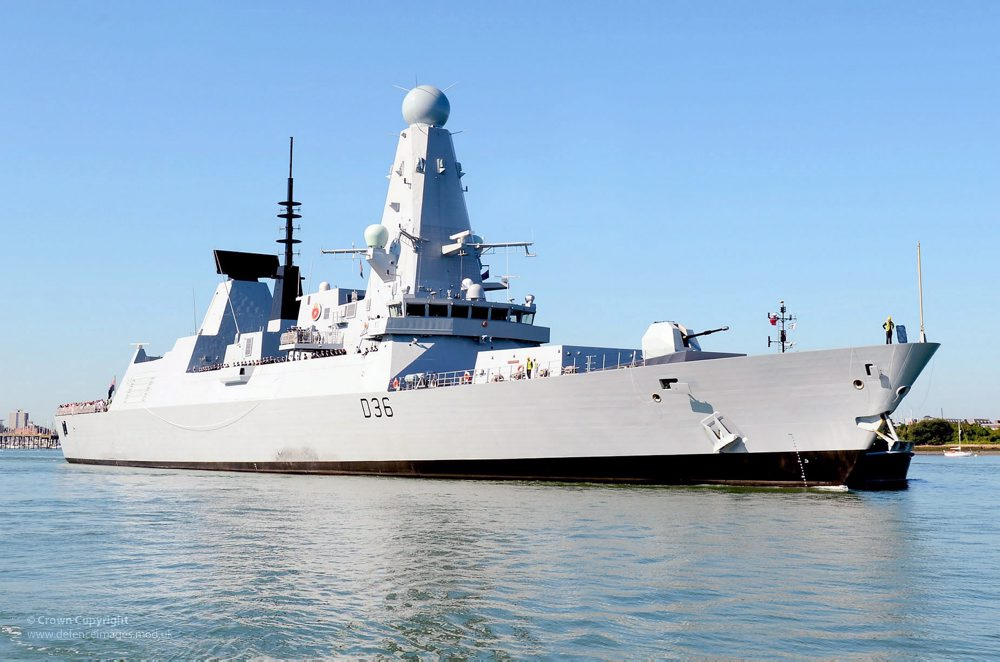
HMS Defender in 2012

- Placing the electric motors closer to the propeller, shortening the shaft line and removing the need for a gearbox or controllable pitch propellers, and reducing exposure to action damage.
- Ability to arrange machinery in more convenient locations away from the shaft line, reducing space lost to funnels, and improving access for maintenance.
- Flexibility in running propulsion and ship services from any combination of prime movers, reducing engine running hours and emissions.
- Ability to distribute prime mover power between services and propulsion can accommodate future increases in service and weapon loads with minimal impact on ship speed or prime movers.

The key to the efficient use of a single prime mover is the choice of a gas turbine that provides efficiency over a large load range; the WR-21 gas turbine incorporates compressor intercooling and exhaust heat recovery, making it significantly more efficient than previous marine gas turbines, especially at low and medium load. The combination of greater efficiency and high fuel capacity gives an endurance of 7,000 nautical miles (13,000 km) at 18 knots (33 km/h). High power density and the hydrodynamic efficiency of a longer hull form allow high speeds to be sustained. It has been reported that Daring reached her design speed of 29 knots (54 km/h) in 70 seconds and achieved a speed of 31.5 knots (58 km/h) in 120 seconds during sea trials in August 2007.

==== Faults ====
In January 2016, the Ministry of Defence acknowledged that the propulsion system was (prior to upgrade) unreliable, with the BBC reporting that "total electric failures are common".

The Rolls Royce WR-21 gas turbine itself is of a sound design: however, the Northrop Grumman intercooler unit "has a major design flaw" and causes the WR-21s to fail occasionally. When this happens, the electrical load on the diesel generators can become too great, and they 'trip out', leaving the ship with no source of power or propulsion. The First Sea Lord, Admiral Philip Jones, clarified that the "WR-21 gas turbines were designed in extreme hot weather conditions to what we call 'gracefully degrade' in their performance, until you get to the point where it goes beyond the temperature at which they would operate... we found that the resilience of the diesel generators and the WR-21 in the ship at the moment was not degrading gracefully; it was degrading catastrophically, so that is what we have had to address".

While the Ministry of Defence does not release detailed information related to the number of problems experienced by the class, including total engine failure, several such occasions have been reported in the media. Daring broke down in November 2010 and April 2012, Dauntless in February 2014 and Duncan in November 2016. In November 2017, The Register reported that a Type 45 destroyer had been recalled to Britain with propeller problems, leaving the Royal Navy's traditional "east of Suez" deployment without proper warship cover. It was stated that "HMS Diamond is on her way back to the UK after a propeller problem proved too much for the ship's crew to repair on their own."

On 21 March 2018, the MoD announced the award of the £160 million "Power Improvement Project" (PIP) contract to BAE Systems, BMT Defence Services, and Cammell Laird to remove the two current diesel generators and install three larger diesel generators at the latter's shipyard in Birkenhead. Replacement or rectification of the WR-21s was not a practical option. With the new diesel generators, the Type 45 needs to rely on the WR-21s only for higher-speed running and always with graceful degradation to cruising without catastrophic loss of power. Dauntless arrived at Cammell Laird on 6 May 2020 to become the first ship to start the PIP upgrade. Completion of the upgrade of all six ships is planned by the mid-2020s.

=== Advanced air-defence ===
The Type 45 destroyers are primarily designed for anti-air warfare, able to defend against targets such as fighter aircraft, drones, and highly manoeuverable sea-skimming anti-ship missiles travelling at supersonic speeds. The Royal Navy describes the destroyers' mission as "to shield the Fleet from air attack".

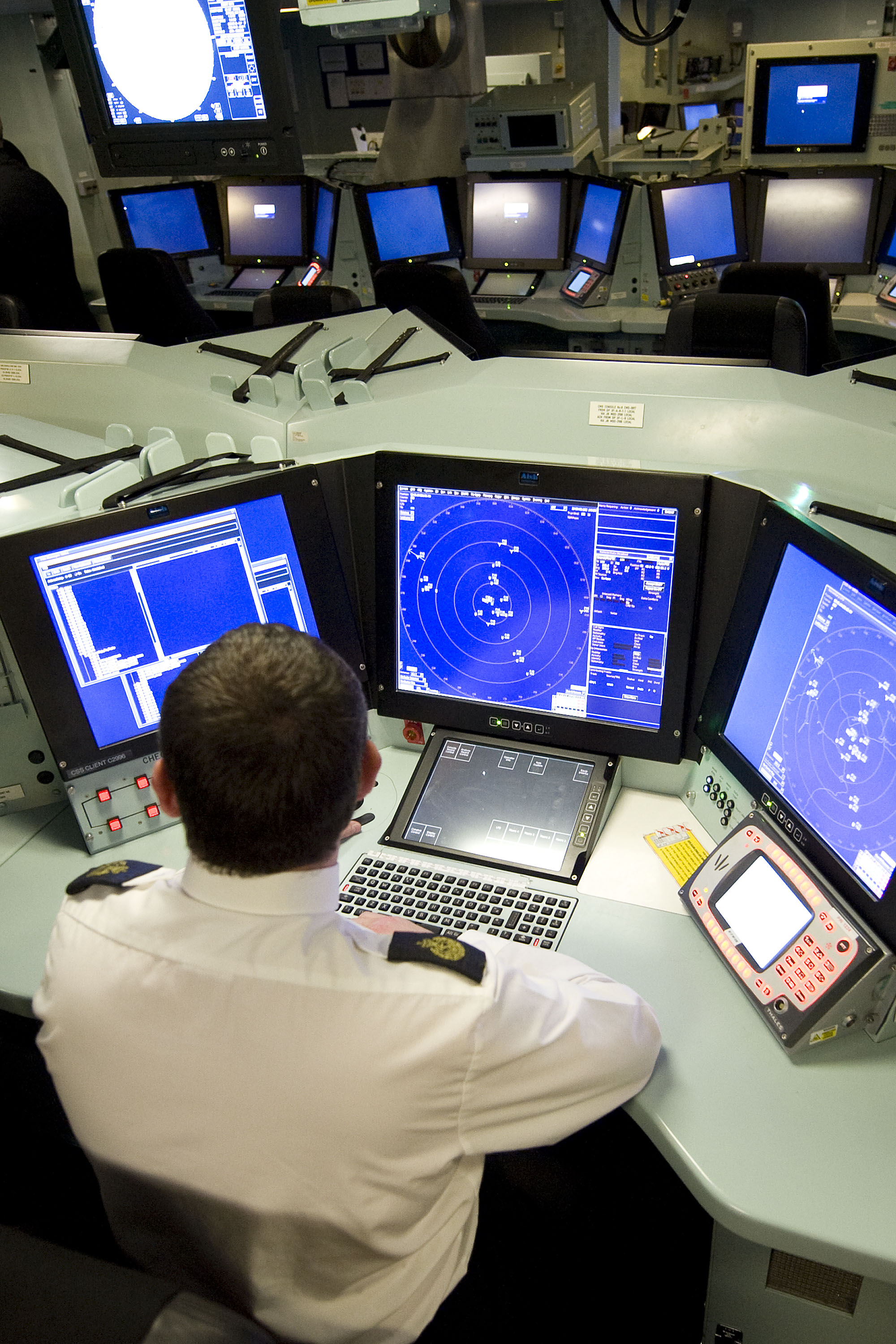
The operations room aboard HMS Daring

The Type 45 destroyer is equipped with the Sea Viper (PAAMS) air-defence system utilising the SAMPSON active electronically scanned array multi-function radar and the S1850M long-range radar. PAAMS can track over 2,000 targets and simultaneously control and coordinate multiple missiles in the air at once, allowing a large number of tracks to be intercepted and destroyed at any given time. This makes it particularly difficult to swamp PAAMS during a saturation attack, even if the attacking elements are supersonic. The US Naval War College has suggested that the SAMPSON radar is capable of tracking 1,000 objects the size of a cricket ball travelling at three times the speed of sound (Mach 3), emphasising the system's capabilities against high-performance stealth targets.

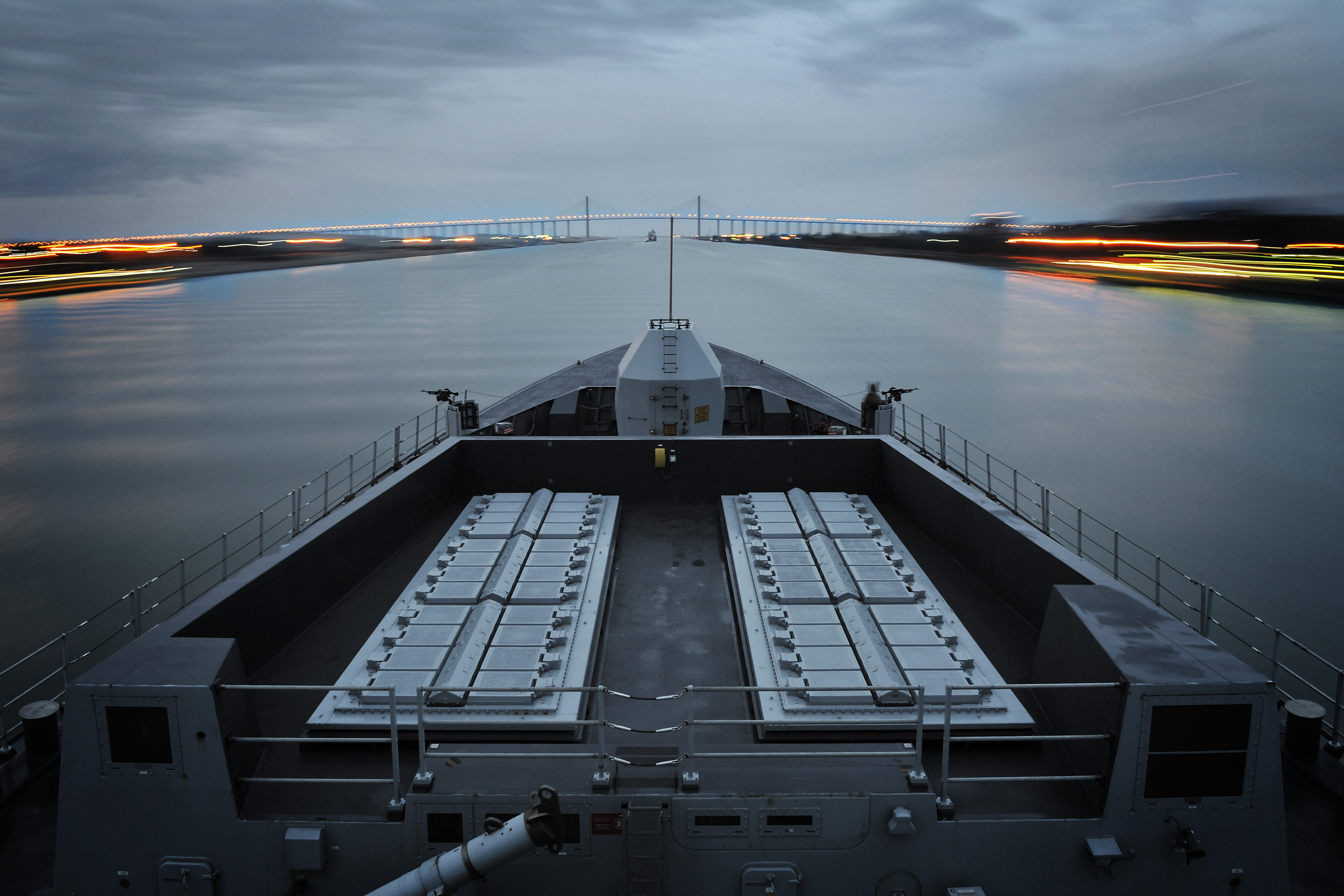
48-cell A50 Sylver Vertical Launching System on Daring

A core component of PAAMS is the Aster missile, comprising Aster 15 and Aster 30. MBDA describes Aster as a "hit-to-kill" anti-missile missile capable of intercepting all types of high-performance air threats at a maximum range of 120 km. The Aster missile is autonomously guided and equipped with an active RF seeker enabling it to cope with "saturated attacks" thanks to a "multiple engagement capability" and a "high rate of fire". The Daring-class destroyers are equipped with a 48-cell A50 Sylver Vertical Launching System, allowing for a mix of up to 48 Aster 15 and 30 missiles.

In addition to its anti-air warfare role, PAAMS offers additional anti-ballistic missile capabilities. In March 2013, the United States Naval Institute reported that the Royal Navy, along with the United States Missile Defense Agency, would explore the potential of the Daring class to provide ballistic missile defence in Europe along with United States Navy Aegis Combat System-equipped destroyers. In May 2014, Jane's Information Group reported that the United Kingdom is committing more funds to explore the capabilities of the SAMPSON multi-function radar and the Type 45 destroyer in a ballistic missile defence role. This followed a successful live firing event at the Ronald Reagan Ballistic Missile Defense Test Site, Kwajalein Atoll in the Western Pacific Ocean, where Daring demonstrated the ability to "[detect] at the earliest opportunity, with tracks maintained through to intercept" two medium-range ballistic missile surrogate targets. BAE Systems reportedly told Jane's that the SAMPSON multi-function radar "exceeded expectations in all respects". An "Experiment Concurrency and Cueing (TECC)" event for the Type 45 was planned for late 2015.

Due to the greater capabilities of the Type 45 over predecessors, the high price per ship, and the public attention they have attracted, defence analysts and correspondents have referred to them as the "most advanced" or "most powerful" air-defence destroyers in the world. BAE Systems claim that "the Type 45 Destroyer is recognised as the most advanced anti-air warfare vessel in the world." Nick Brown, the editor-in-chief of Jane's International Defence Review, was quoted by The Huffington Post saying, "It's certainly one of the most advanced air defence ships in the world... The US Aegis system is similar, but Sea Viper is more advanced."

== Weapons, countermeasures, capabilities and sensors ==
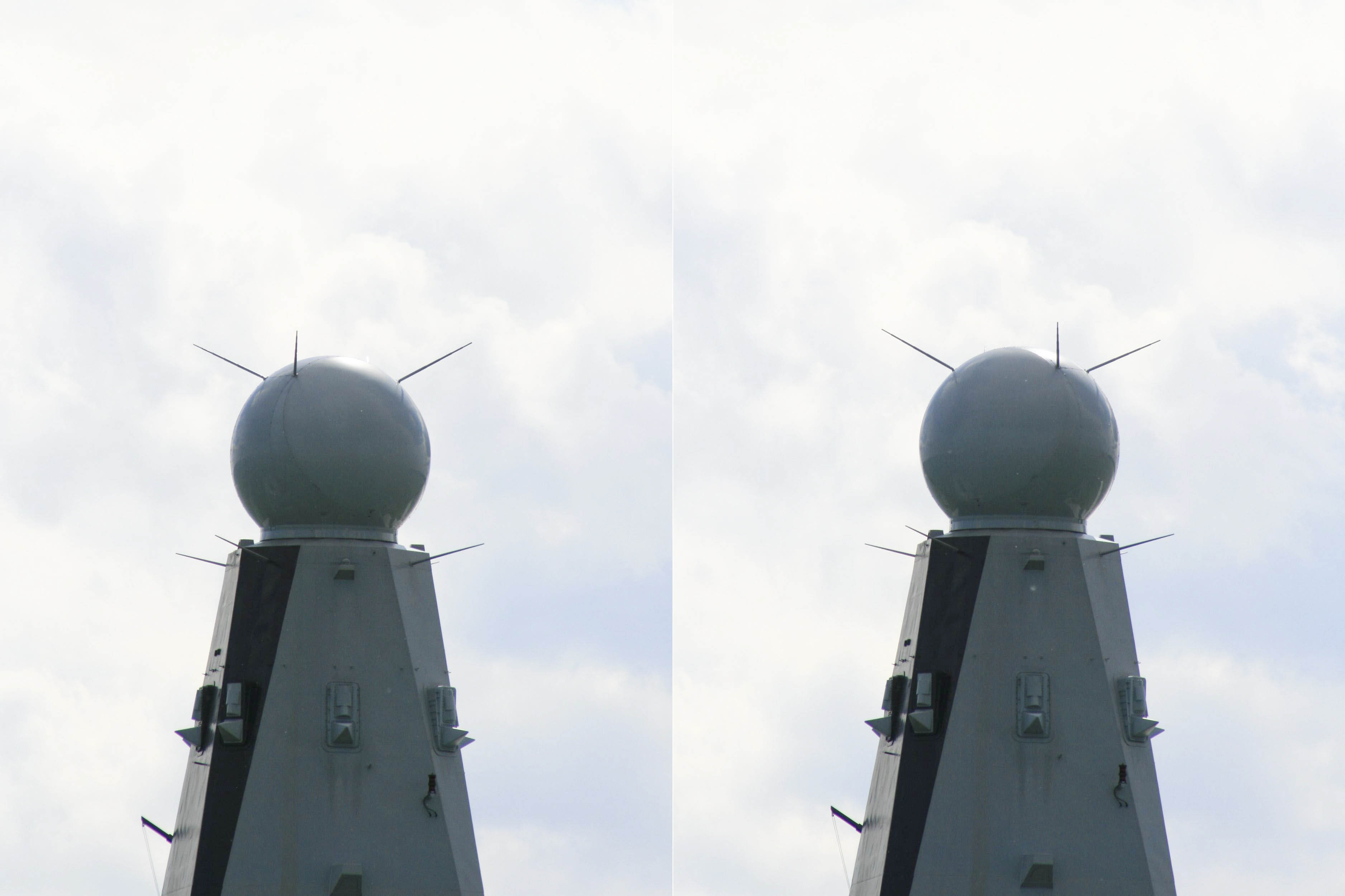
The SAMPSON AESA each of two faces of multi-function air tracking radar makes a full 360° rotation every four seconds.

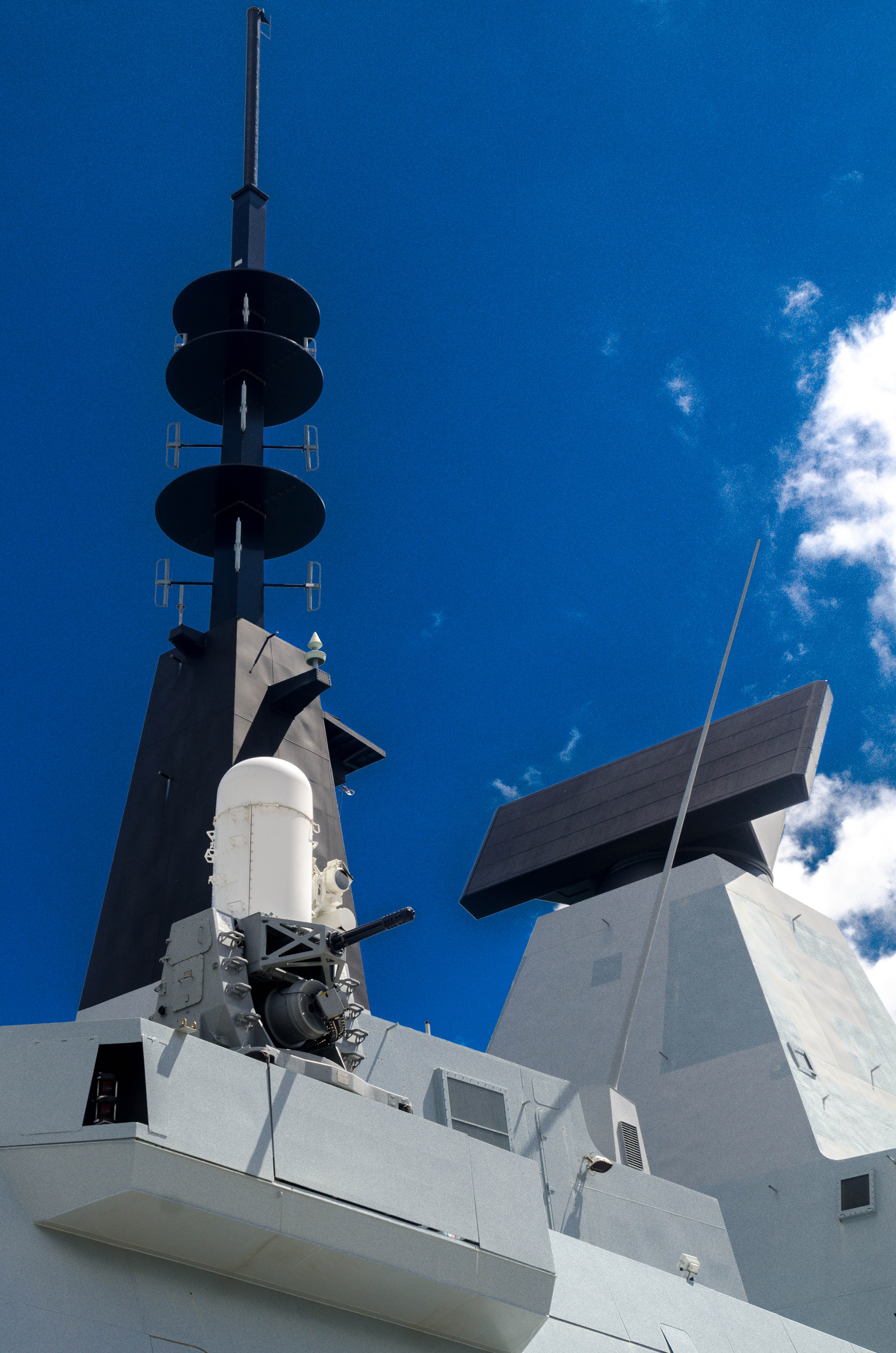
The S1850M long-range air surveillance radar on HMS Daring. A 20 mm Phalanx CIWS gun mount can be seen in the foreground.

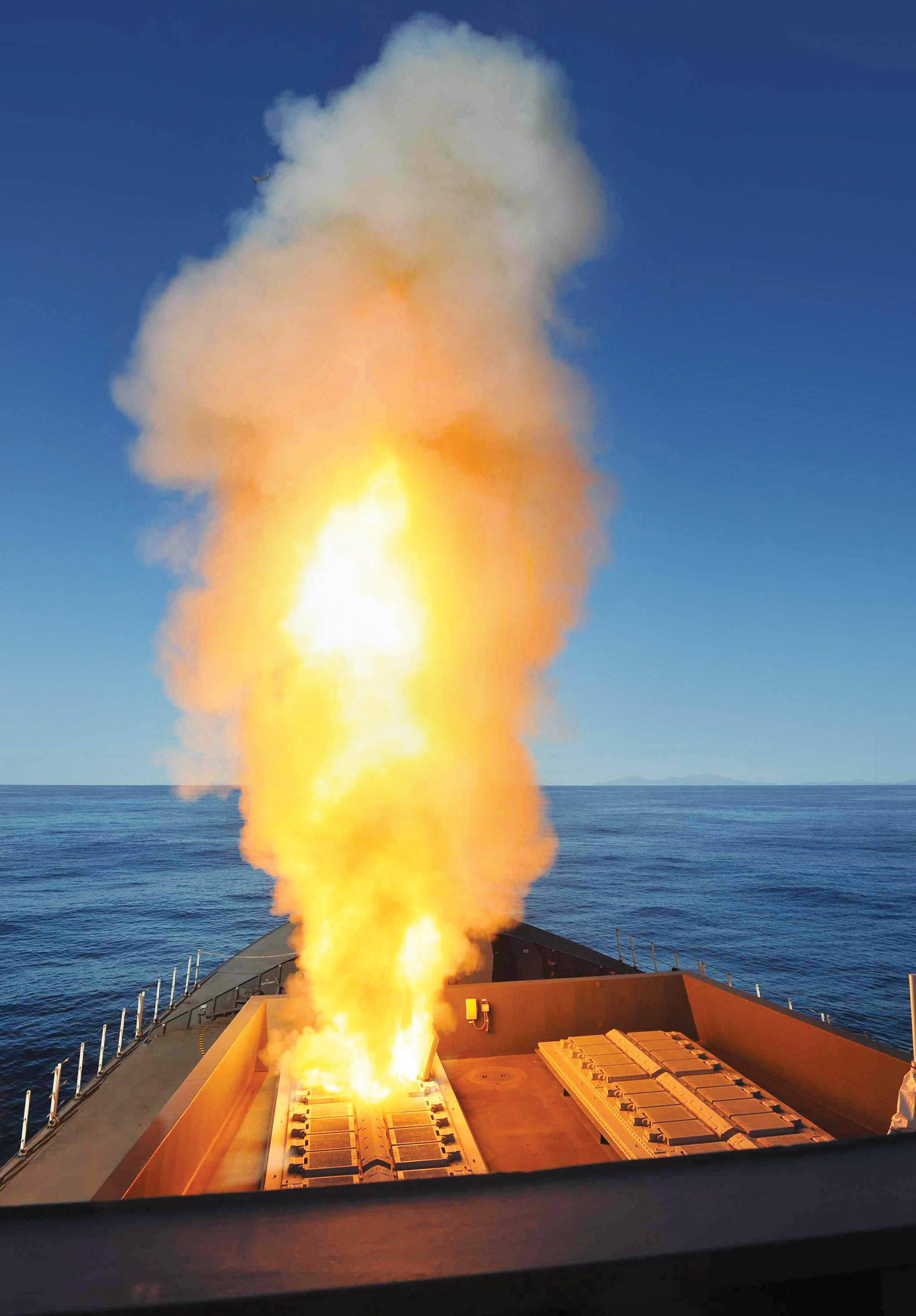
HMS Diamond firing an Aster missile for the first time

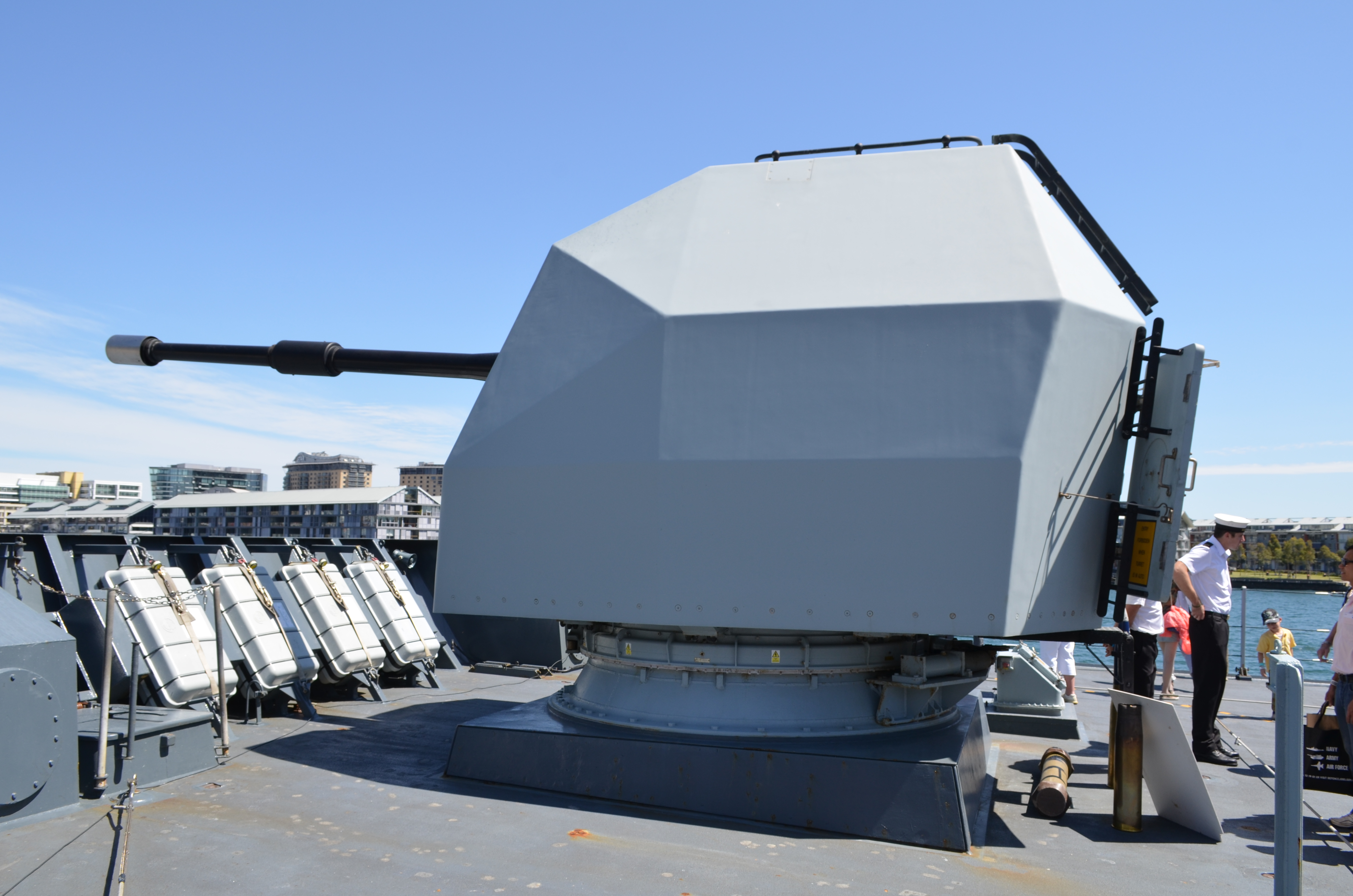
The BAE 4.5-inch Mark 8 naval gun on Daring

=== Anti-air warfare ===
The Sea Viper air-defence system consists of the SAMPSON active electronically scanned array multi-function air tracking radar, which is capable of tracking hundreds of targets (range 400 km, 250 mi).

- S1850M 3D long-range air surveillance radar, capable of tracking up to 1,000 targets (range 400 km).

A 48-cell A50 Sylver Vertical Launching System for a mix of up to 48 shorter-ranged Aster 15 missiles (1.7–30 km (1.1–18.6 mi)) and Aster 30 Block 0 missiles covering 3–120 km (1.9–74.6 mi).

The Type 45 did not have a formal theatre ballistic missile defence (TBMD) capability, but its potential for such a role was being assessed. Land-based Aster 30 Block 1 missiles have intercepted short-range ballistic missiles, and trials of a land-based SAMPSON modified for BMD were planned for early 2012. The Ministry of Defence announced in 2013 that the first ship, Daring, would take part in ballistic defence trials with the US Missile Defence Agency (MDA) as part of a major research and development programme. In March 2016, Britain and France announced a joint procurement programme with the intention of France acquiring Brimstone missiles to equip the Eurocopter Tiger Mk 3 helicopter and Britain acquiring Aster Block 1NT missiles capable of intercepting medium-range ballistic missiles of 1,000–1,500 km (620–930 mi) range. A block 2 version of the Aster 30 NT capable of intercepting 3,000 km (1,900 mi) range missiles is under development by France and Italy.

Planned upgrades

In July 2021, it was announced that the destroyers' anti-air armament was to be enhanced with the addition of a 24-cell silo for Sea Ceptor surface-to-air missiles. These were reported as likely to be in lieu of Aster 15 missiles, permitting the 48 Sylver A50 launch cells to be entirely devoted to carrying Aster 30. It was also announced that Eurosam would provide a refresh of the Aster 30 missile systems. All six ships were to be upgraded from 2026 to 2032.

In May 2022, the Ministry of Defence announced that the Royal Navy's Type 45 destroyers would be upgraded with a ballistic missile defence capability. As part of the Sea Viper Evolution programme, the six ships would be equipped with Aster 30 Block 1 missiles and receive upgrades to their SAMPSON radars and Sea Viper command and control systems.

In order to defend against the growing threat posed by UAVs, MBDA UK was contracted in 2025 to deliver two DragonFire laser-based directed energy weapon (DEW) systems for the Type 45 destroyer, with the first ship to be fit in 2027. In late 2026, photos also revealed that an undetermined C-UAS system for anti-drone defence had been deployed on HMS Dauntless with two 1x2 meter box launchers deployed amidships. It was unclear whether other vessels in the class would be similarly equipped.

=== Guns ===
- 1 × BAE Systems 4.5-inch Mark 8 Mod 1 naval gun. As of November 2011, the Mk 8 Mod 1 is scheduled to remain in service until the 2030s, with a Mod 2 upgrade along the way to address obsolescence.
- 2 × 30 mm Small Calibre Guns on single DS-30B mounts.
- 2 × Phalanx 20 mm calibre close-in weapon systems (CIWS).
- 2 × 7.62 mm M134 Miniguns. (replaced by 0.5 inch (12.7 mm) Browning heavy machine guns as of 2023)
- Up to 6 × 7.62 mm L7A2 General Purpose Machine Guns.

=== Aviation ===
The flight deck of the Type 45 is large enough to accommodate aircraft up to the size of a Boeing Chinook helicopter. It has hangar space for either one Merlin HM1 or two Westland Lynx helicopters. The Merlin HM2 has a dipping sonar, sonobuoys and radar; the Merlin can carry four anti-submarine Sting Ray torpedoes, while the smaller Lynx HMA8 can carry either two Sting Ray torpedoes or four Sea Skua anti-ship missiles. From 2015, the Lynx has been replaced in RN service by the AW159 Wildcat, whose weapons include the Martlet missile from 2021 and the 'Future Air-to-Surface Guided Weapon (Heavy)' missile from 2026. The Wildcat relies on the ship's sensors in attacking submarine targets since, in RN service as of 2019, it lacks dipping sonar or sonobuoys of its own.

=== Anti-ship, submarine and land-attack ===
Four of the six Type 45 destroyers received Mk 141 missile launchers for Harpoon, recycled from the last four decommissioned Type 22 frigates. Duncan, Diamond and Daring all received this upgrade. As of 2022, it was reported that Harpoon SSMs were no longer deployed on the destroyers. However, as of March 2023, HMS Duncan was still equipped with Harpoon, though the missile was withdrawn from all the destroyers by the end of 2023. In November 2022, it was announced that the Royal Navy would replace Harpoon with the Naval Strike Missile (NSM) , on the Type 45 destroyers.

The Type 45 has a bow-mounted medium-frequency Ultra/EDO MFS-7000 sonar but has no shipboard anti-submarine weapons. The class relies on its helicopter(s) for ASW. As of August 2013, there were no plans to fit anti-submarine torpedo tubes.

The 4.5-inch Mark 8 Mod 1 naval gun can be used against ships and for naval gunfire support (NGS) against land targets.

=== Countermeasures ===
- The Seagnat decoy system allows for the seduction and distraction of radar-guided weapons through active and passive means. An infrared countermeasure device is planned for future retrofits.
- Airborne Systems's Naval Decoy IDS300 floating naval decoy system (corner reflectors).
- Surface Ship Torpedo Defence System (SSTD) active torpedo decoy system.

=== Communications and other systems ===
- Fully Integrated Communications System (FICS45): a combined external and internal communications system supplied by Thales and Selex ES Ltd.
- In 2012, the UAT Mod 2.0 digital Radar Electronic Surveillance system was fitted to Daring and Diamond as part of a £40m contract with Thales UK that will see UAT Mod 2.1 fitted to the other Type 45s.
- METOC Meteorology and Oceanography: The Metoc system by BAE Systems comprises the Upper Air Sounding System using launchable radiosondes by Eurodefence Systems Ltd and Graw Radiosondes (Germany) joint venture, as well as a comprehensive weather satellite receiving system and a bathymetric system. These sensors provide each vessel with full environmental awareness for tasks such as radar propagation, ballistics, and general self-supporting meteorological and oceanographic data production.

=== Additional capabilities ===
The Type 45 has sufficient space to embark 60 Royal Marines and their equipment.

The Type 45 destroyers are designed with the ability to operate as flagships.

== Operational history ==
In support of protecting merchant ships transiting the Red Sea and the Gulf of Aden, HMS Diamond shot down a suspected attack drone targeting commercial shipping with a single Sea Viper (Aster) missile on the night of 15 December 2023. According to Navy Lookout, the Sea Viper missile that was used costs around £1–2 million and the drone it shot down may have only cost 20,000 US dollars. In the same theatre of war, the United States Navy's, USS Carney, shot down 14 drones, most likely, using her main gun which is a much cheaper method. The Royal Navy is unable to use the main gun on their ships to do this, the 4.5-inch Mark 8, because software support for anti-aircraft use has been withdrawn (RN ships will not have anti-aircraft main gun capability until the Type 26 frigates, or Type 31 frigates, are in service). The in service Type 23 frigates have the Sea Ceptor missile system which can be used to shoot down drones and is cheaper than the Sea Viper (Aster) missile system. It will be several years until the Type 45 destroyers are fitted with the Sea Ceptor upgrade. On 10 January 2024, it was reported that Diamond had shot down seven drones in the Red Sea using a combination of her missiles and guns on 9 January as part of a force that brought down "21 drones and missiles" that night.

On Wednesday 24 April 2024, HMS Diamond used a single Sea Viper (Aster) missile to shoot down a ballistic missile which had been launched from Houthi-controlled areas of Yemen and which according to American sources was likely targeting a US container ship. It was the first time since the Gulf War of 1991 that the Royal Navy had intercepted any kind of missile in combat, when HMS Gloucester shot down an Iraqi Silkworm cruise missile. It is also the first time that the Royal Navy's Sea Viper system has shot down a ballistic missile in combat.

In 2026, the Ministry of Defence launched a study into extending the Type 45 destroyers’ service lives beyond their planned retirement dates in the mid‑2030s, following the cancellation of the Type 83 programme and delays to the Hybrid Navy concept intended to deliver their replacement. The review, funded through the 2026 Defence Investment Plan, will assess the transition to the proposed Maritime Air Defence system and whether an overlap period or life‑extension measures will be required to maintain the Royal Navy’s high‑end air‑defence capability

== Ships in the class ==
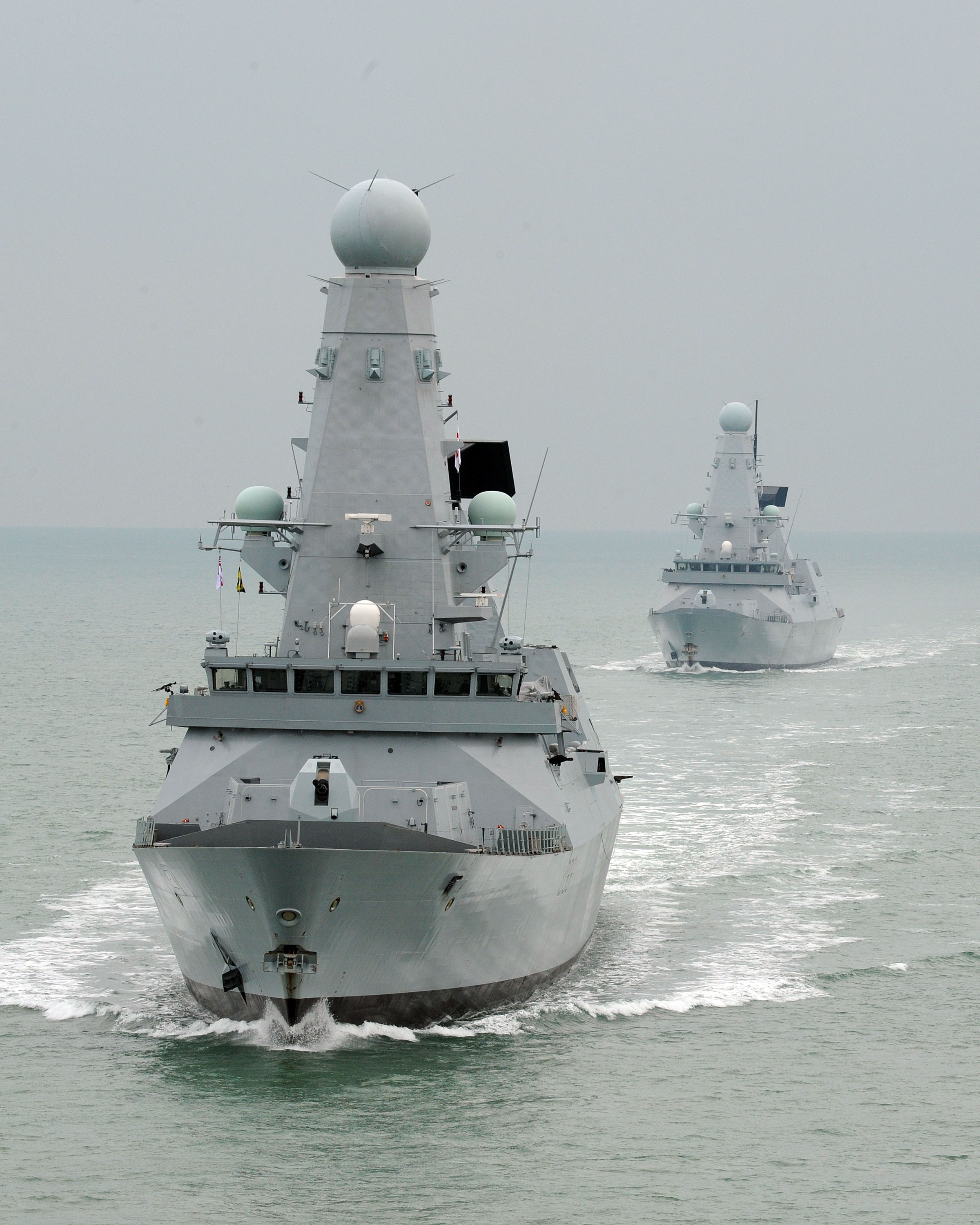
Dauntless (front) operating with Daring off the Isle of Wight in 2010

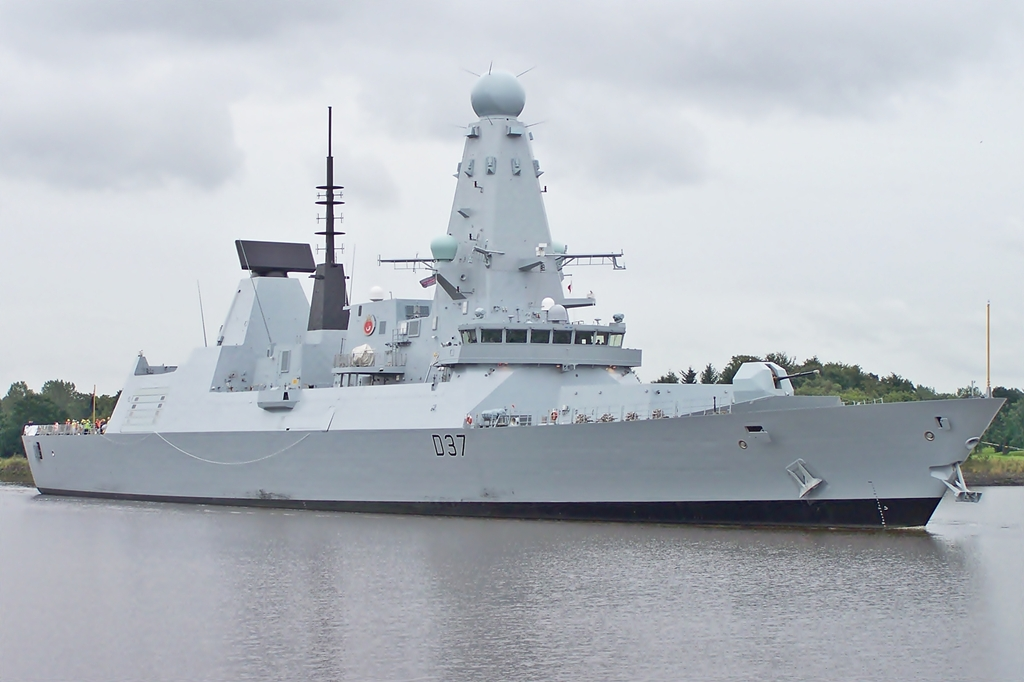
Duncan, the last ship of the class, departing for sea trials in 2012

Six ships were ordered, and transfer of custody of the first happened on 10 December 2008. The MoD's initial planning assumption was to procure twelve ships on a like-for-like replacement of a similar number of Type 42s, with the size of the second batch to be determined between 2005 and 2010. However, this was reduced to eight ships in the 2003 defence white paper entitled Delivering Security in a Changing World: Future Capabilities, following a strategic refocusing on "small to medium-scale operations" and expeditionary land operations. It was reported in December 2006 that the last two could be cut. In July 2007, Ministry of Defence officials stated that they "still planned to build eight Type 45 destroyers" and that "the extra two ships were still included in planning assumptions". This plan was officially abandoned on 19 June 2008 when the Minister for the Armed Forces, Bob Ainsworth, announced in Parliament that options for the seventh and eighth destroyers would not be taken up. The continual scaling back of the project, first from twelve to eight, and subsequently to six ships, has been criticised for leaving the Royal Navy with insufficient ships to meet its requirements.

On 9 March 2007, The Independent reported that Saudi Arabia was considering buying "two or three" Type 45s. On 7 September 2007, it was reported that Saudi Arabian officials had been invited to observe Daring's sea trials.

In 2009, the House of Commons Public Accounts Committee conducted an enquiry into the procurement. Its main conclusions were that despite the destroyer being based on 80% new technology, there was a failure to take sufficient account of technical risk, over-optimism, and an inappropriate too-early fixed price project entered into before many elements had been specified. This resulted in a difficult commercial relationship until a contract renegotiation in 2007. It noted that the MoD believed six ships would still enable it to meet the operational requirement of having five ships at sea, with only a small risk of failing to meet that requirement.

In July 2016, it was reported that all six of the class were docked in Portsmouth. The Ministry of Defence said it was "unusual but not unprecedented" and that "All Type 45 destroyers are currently in port as they have either just returned from operations or are about to be deployed, are conducting training or carrying out maintenance or are home for crew to take summer leave."

In an interview with the Sunday Times, former Rear Admiral Chris Parry claimed that the Type 45 destroyers are noisy ships that can be heard 100 nautical miles (190 km; 120 mi) away by submarines. Parry claimed that noise suppression in surface ships has been ignored since the end of the Cold War; the MoD responded to this claim by stating that as air defence ships, noise suppression was not a "premium requirement" for the Type 45 class.

In response to a written question in the House of Commons on 19 July 2021, Jeremy Quinn Minister of State, Ministry of Defence, detailed the status of the Type 45 destroyers as 4 undergoing refit in the UK, one being repaired abroad having been forced to detach from the CSG21 formation and one active with CSG21.

In January 2024 John Healey, Shadow Secretary of State for Defence, submitted a written question: "To ask the Secretary of State for Defence, what the current status is of each of the Royal Navy's Type 45 destroyers". James Cartlidge, Minister of State for the Ministry of Defence, responded: "HMS Diamond, HMS Duncan and HMS Dauntless are all currently available for operations. HMS Daring, HMS Dragon and HMS Defender are all currently at various stages of the Power Improvement Project (PIP)."

The entire class is based at HMNB Portsmouth. All ships were built by BAE Systems Surface Ships.

Name	Pennant no.	First steel cut (Note: The Type 45 is constructed in modules, so the keel is not "laid down" as in the past. The ceremonial start of the ships' construction is "cutting the first sheet" of steel.)	Launched	Date of commission	Power improvement package	Status
Daring	D32	28 March 2003	1 February 2006	23 July 2009	September 2021 to January 2023	To undergo refit
Dauntless	D33	26 August 2004	23 January 2007	3 June 2010	May 2020 to June 2022	In active service
Diamond	D34	25 February 2005	27 November 2007	6 May 2011	October 2024 to date	Undergoing PIP Refit
Dragon	D35	19 December 2005	17 November 2008	20 April 2012	March 2022 to February 2024	In active service
Defender	D36	31 July 2006	21 October 2009	21 March 2013	July 2023 to date	Undergoing PIP Refit
Duncan	D37	26 January 2007	11 October 2010	26 September 2013	TBA	Undergoing PIP Refit

Three ships of the Type 45 Daring class carry the same names as members of the previous Daring-class destroyers of 1949; these are: Daring, Diamond and Defender. These names had been used for the D-class destroyers of the 1930s. The name Duncan, has been used for several ships, including the D-class flotilla leader, and also one of the Type 14 (Blackwood-class) frigates in the 1950s. The remaining Type 45 names, Dauntless and Dragon, were most recently carried by D-class (or Danae-) light cruisers of 1918, which served until 1945.

In December 2020, the Minister for Defence Procurement, Jeremy Quin, indicated that under plans at that time, the Type 45 destroyers would be decommissioned between 2035 and 2038. In January 2024, James Cartlidge, the Minister of State for Defence Procurement, responded to a written question, saying that the last destroyer will retire from service by the end of 2038.

== See also ==
- List of destroyer classes

Equivalent destroyers of the same era

- Atago class – Guided-missile destroyer class in the Japanese Maritime Self-Defense Forces
- Sejong the Great class (Batch I) – Class of South Korean destroyers
- Kolkata class – Class of guided-missile destroyers
- Type 052C – Class of guided missile destroyers in the Chinese People's Liberation Army Navy
- Horizon class – Class of air-defence destroyers
