= S1850M =

Long-range, rotating AESA radar

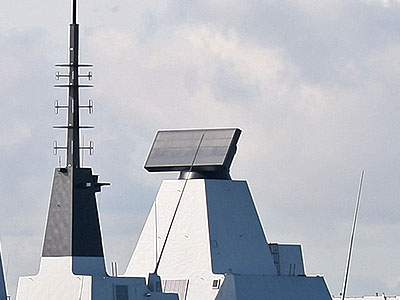
S1850M radar on HMS Daring

The S1850M is a long-range radar with a digital antenna array for wide area search in elevation. The S1850M is manufactured by Thales and BAE Systems Integrated System Technologies (formerly AMS UK). It is a modified version of the Thales Nederland SMART-L radar. The S1850M is advertised as being capable of fully automatic detection, track initiation, and tracking of up to 1,000 targets at a range of 400 kilometres (250 mi). It is also claimed to be highly capable of detecting stealth targets, and able to detect and track outer atmosphere objects at short range, enabling it to form part of a Theatre Ballistic Missile Defence system.

The contract for initial production of the S1850M was signed in 2001: two for the UK, one for France, and one for Italy, with a common prototype based in Toulon. In 2005, a follow-on contract was signed for five more for the UK, one more for France, and one more for Italy.

A further developed version of the Smart-L is being installed on ships by the Royal Netherlands Navy, which is an updated version of the current SMART-L radar called the SMART-L-EWC (Early Warning Capability) Radar. It has a greater search radius: a tracking range of 2000 km for ballistic missiles and 480 km for air targets. SMART-L EWC is a programmable AESA radar that is characterized by full flexibility. Additional capabilities can be introduced during its lifetime according to customer needs. This makes the radar future-proof in case of evolving requirements.

== Applications ==
- UK Royal Navy: Type 45 destroyer and Queen Elizabeth-class aircraft carrier
- France: Horizon-class frigate
- Italy: Orizzonte-class destroyer

In all its current applications, the S1850M is the long-range radar (LRR) component of the Principal Anti-Air Missile System. On the Type 45 destroyers, it is paired with the SAMPSON multifunction radar; on the Horizon ships, it is paired with the EMPAR multifunction radar.

On 11 February 2009, Thales indicated that the S1850M radar will be fitted on the Royal Navy's Queen Elizabeth-class aircraft carrier.
