= Rolls-Royce WR-21 =

Marine gas turbine engine

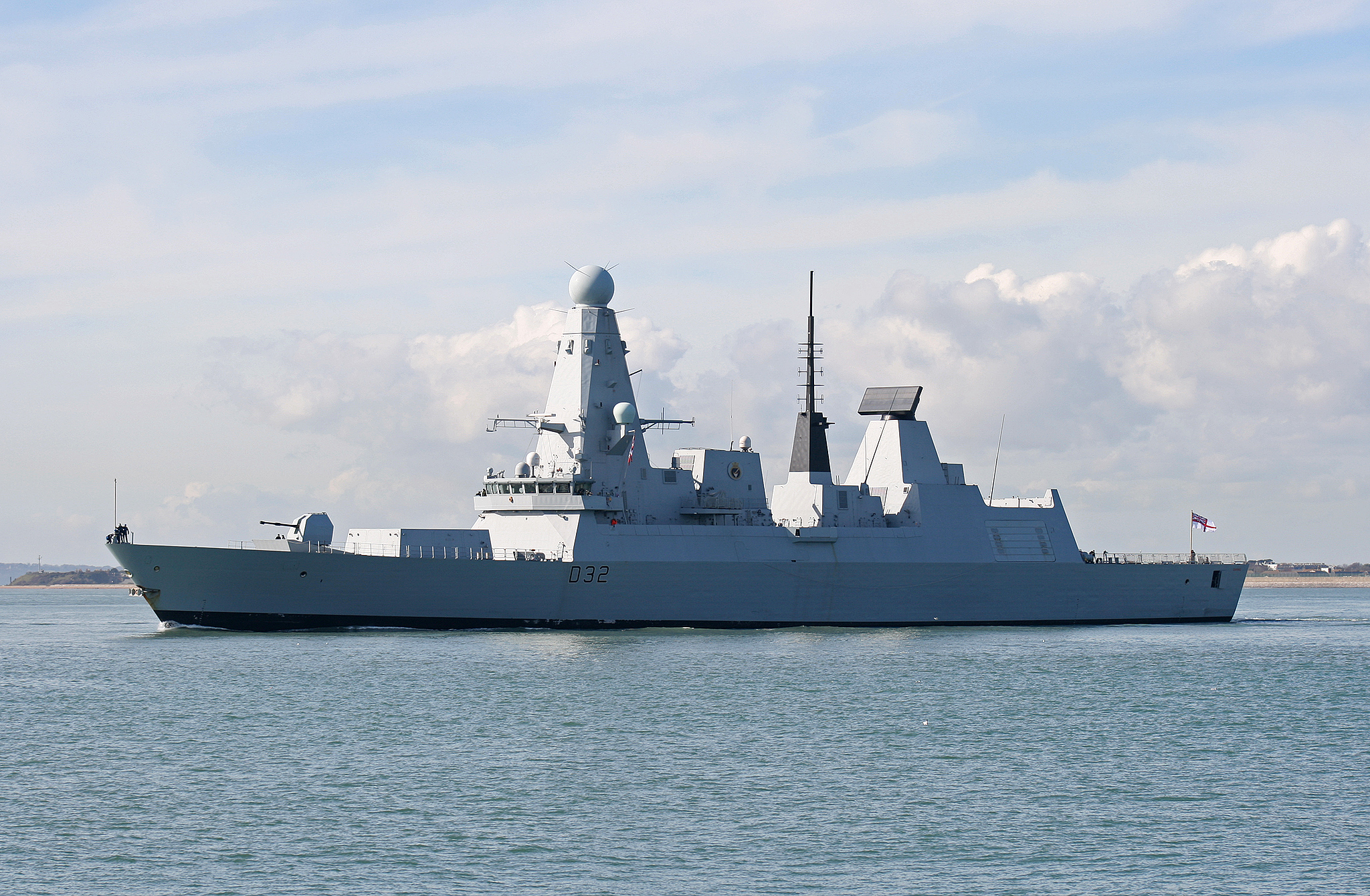
The WR-21 powers Royal Navy Type 45 destroyers.

The Rolls-Royce WR-21 is a gas turbine marine engine, designed with a view to powering the latest naval surface combatants of the partner nations.

== History ==
Developed with government funding input from the United Kingdom, France and the United States, the WR-21 was designed and manufactured by an international consortium led by Northrop Grumman as prime contractor. The turbine itself was designed primarily by Rolls-Royce with significant marine engineering and test facility input from DCN, with Northrop Grumman responsible for the intercooler, the recuperator and system integration.

WR-21 development draws heavily on the technology of the successful Rolls-Royce RB211 and Trent families of gas turbines.

The original design and development of the WR-21 was carried out by Westinghouse Electric Corporation (later Northrop Grumman Marine Systems) under a US Navy contract placed in December 1991. Later the Royal Navy and the French Navy became interested in the WR-21, leading to Rolls-Royce and DCN involvement.

The WR-21 is the propulsion system of Royal Navy Type 45 destroyers.

== Design ==
The WR-21 is the first aeroderivative gas turbine to incorporate gas compressor intercooler and exhaust heat recovery system technologies that deliver low specific fuel consumption across the engine's operating range. It offers a reduction in fuel burn of 30% across the typical ship operating profile.

- The intercooler cools air entering the high-pressure compressor, reducing the amount of energy required to compress the air.
- The recuperator preheats the combustion air by recovering waste heat from the exhaust, improving cycle efficiency and reducing fuel consumption.

== Specifications ==
- Rated power: 25.2 MW
- Specific fuel consumption: approximately 190 g/kWh (53 g/MJ)
- Main module wet weight: 45,974 kg
- Twin-spool gas generator and free-rotating power turbine
  - Low-pressure (LP) spool with six-stage compressor and single-stage turbine at 6,200 rpm
  - High-pressure (HP) spool with six-stage compressor and single-stage turbine at 8,100 rpm
  - Five-stage free power turbine 3,600 rpm (60 Hz)
- Intercooler between LP and HP compressors
- Nine radial combustors
- Exhaust heat recuperator to combustor inlet air

== Operational issues ==
In 2009 it was discovered that the Northrop Grumman intercooler as fitted in the WR-21, on Type 45 destroyers, had a major design flaw, failing to operate in water temperatures beyond 30 °C. The intercooler of the first Type 45 destroyer, HMS Daring, failed in the mid-Atlantic in 2010 and had to be repaired in Canada, with further repairs for intercooler failure in 2012 in Bahrain. The Type 45's pioneering integrated electric propulsion (IEP) system uses two WR-21s and two Wartsila 2-MW diesel generators to power everything on board, including weapons systems in addition to propulsion and other functions, leaving the ships vulnerable to "total electric failure". The Ministry of Defence said: "The Type 45 was designed for world-wide operations, from sub-Arctic to extreme tropical environments, and continues to operate effectively in the Gulf and the South Atlantic all year round."

The WR-21 engines will have to be supplemented by one or two additional diesel generators, fitted by cutting open the hull in dry dock.

Former First Sea Lord Admiral Philip Jones clarified that "WR-21 gas turbines were designed in extreme hot weather conditions to what we call "gracefully degrade" in their performance, until you get to the point where it goes beyond the temperature at which they would operate... we found that the resilience of the diesel generators and the WR-21 in the ship at the moment was not degrading gracefully; it was degrading catastrophically, so that is what we have had to address." The Admiral still argued that despite the problems, the Royal Navy has been able to deploy Type 45 destroyers in nine-month cycles to the Gulf region where temperatures are high with little fault. The Royal Navy has also been able to maintain at least two Type 45s at operational readiness.
