= Naval Decoy IDS300 =

Naval missile decoy system

Naval Decoy IDS300 (Mk 59)
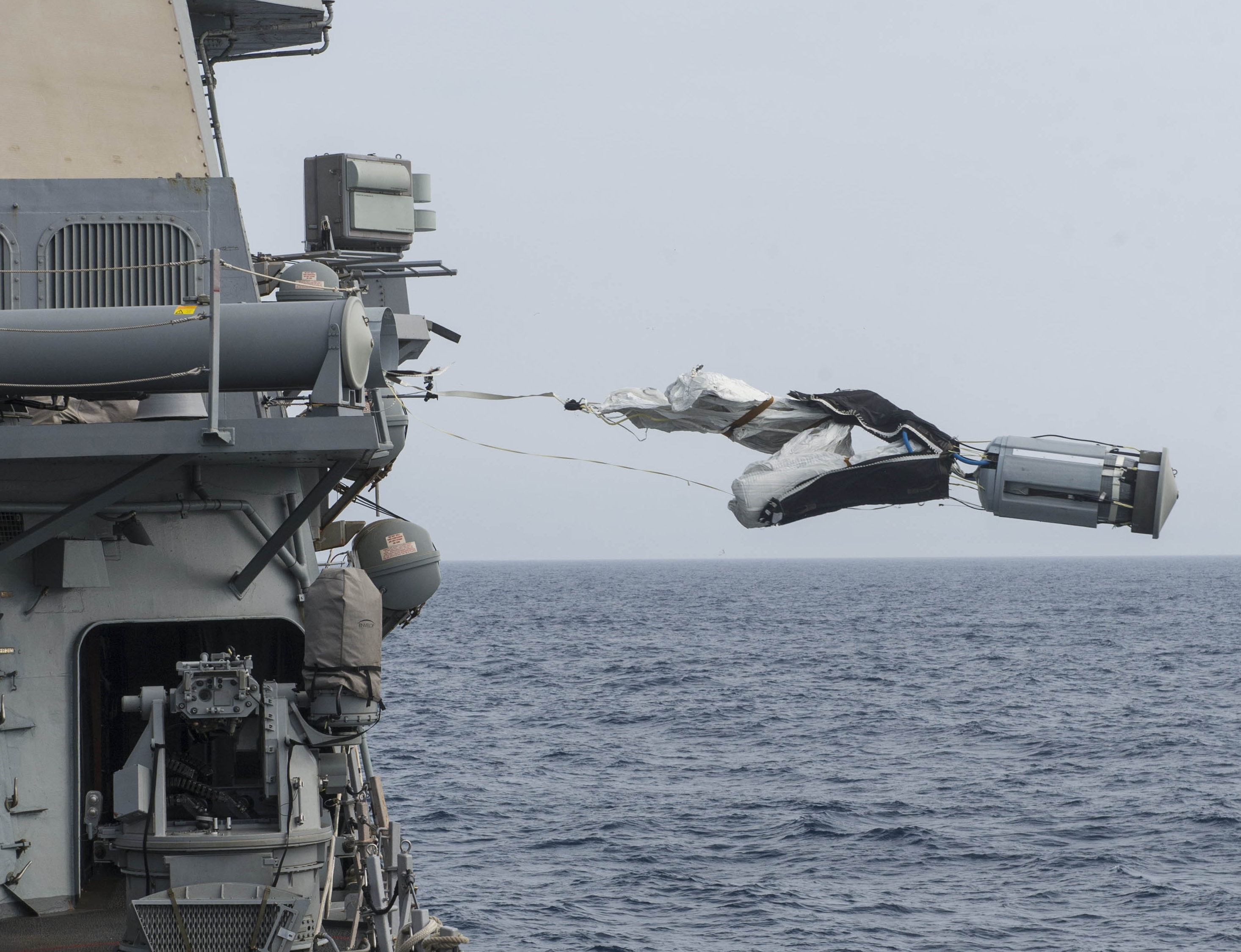
- Launch from USS Ramage (DDG‑61), 2014
- Type: Passive inflatable radar decoy
- Place of origin: United Kingdom

Service history
- In service: c. 2014–present
- Used by: Royal Navy; United States Navy

Production history
- Designer: Irvin Aerospace Ltd (formerly Irvin‑GQ)
- Manufacturer: Irvin Aerospace Ltd
- Produced: c. 2014–present

Specifications
- Diameter: Octahedral (inflated)

Naval Decoy IDS300 (Inflatable Decoy System) is a passive, off-board, octahedral, corner reflector decoy of the Royal Navy's Type 45 destroyer and the US Navy's Arleigh Burke-class destroyer, forming part of a layered defence to counter anti-ship missiles. Unlike chaff, the decoy is persistent and will float for up to three hours in sea state 4.

Jane's was first to report the United Kingdom was looking for a new floating decoy as part of a program known as the Naval Passive Off-Board Decoy (N-POD), on March 3, 2019. In US Navy service, it is designated as the Mk 59 decoy launching system. The system is made by Irvin Aerospace Ltd, Hertfordshire in the United Kingdom.

== Deployment ==
The decoy is launched out of a deck-mounted tube and self-inflates on the sea surface before being released to free-float past the stern to mimic a ship's radar and radio signatures. The deployment and inflation process takes seconds and the decoy is completely independent, requiring no further input from the ship. Typical ship fitment is four launchers, fitted using eight bolts and an electrical feed. The system is most effective in littoral waters with a calm sea state.

== Upgrades and future trends ==
In March 2024, the UK Ministry of Defence awarded a £135 million contract for the development of the Ancilia trainable decoy launcher, intended to replace fixed-tube systems (like Seagnat and IDS300) across Type 45, 26, and 31 classes. Ancilia will enable rapid, vectorable launches of RF and IR decoys without ship manoeuvre.

Meanwhile, the US Navy continues to research active and airborne decoy systems, including Mk 234 and GEN-X to augment existing passive systems.

== See also ==
- AN/SLQ-49 Chaff Buoy Decoy System
- Electronic countermeasure
- Electronic warfare
- Nulka
