= HNLMS De Zeven Provinciën (F802) =

Frigate

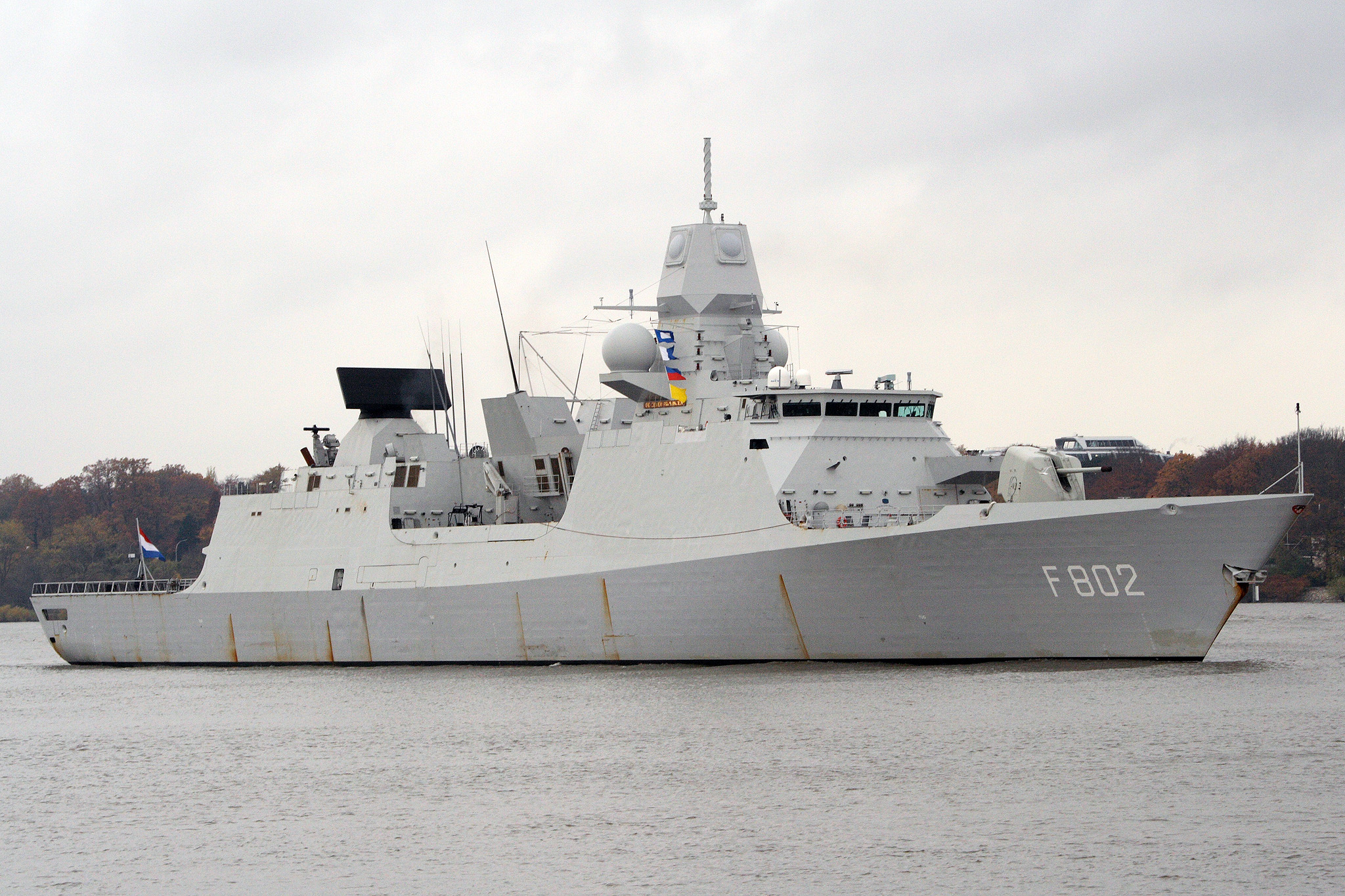

History

Netherlands
- Name: De Zeven Provinciën
- Namesake: De Zeven Provinciën
- Builder: Damen Schelde Naval Shipbuilding
- Laid down: 1 September 1998
- Launched: 8 April 2000
- Commissioned: 26 April 2002
- Identification: MMSI number: 244911000; Callsign: PAEQ
- Status: In active service
- Badge

General characteristics
- Class & type: De Zeven Provinciën-class frigate
- Displacement: 6,050 tonnes (full load)
- Length: 144.24 m (473 ft 3 in)
- Beam: 18.8 m (61 ft 8 in)
- Draft: 5.18 m (17 ft 0 in)
- Propulsion: Combined diesel or gas; 2 × Wärtsilä 16 V26 marine diesel engines, 5.1 MW (6,800 hp) each; 2 × Rolls-Royce Marine Spey SM 1C gas turbines, 19.5 MW (26,100 hp) each; 2 × propeller shafts, 5-bladed controllable pitch propellers
- Speed: 30 knots (56 km/h; 35 mph)
- Complement: 174 (202 incl. command staff)
- Sensors & processing systems: Thales Nederland SMART-L long-range air and surface surveillance radar; Thales Nederland APAR air and surface search, tracking and guidance radar (I band); DECCA NAV navigation radar; Thales Nederland Scout (Low-probability-of-intercept) surface search/navigation radar; Thales Nederland Sirius IRST long-range infrared surveillance and tracking system; Thales Nederland Mirador optical surveillance and tracking system; Atlas Elektronik DSQS-24C hull-mounted sonar; MK XII IFF system
- Electronic warfare & decoys: Thales Sabre ECM suite
- Armament: Guns: 1 × Oto Melara 127 mm/54 dual-purpose gun; 2–4 × Browning M2 12.7 mm machine guns; 4–6 × FN MAG 7.62 mm machine guns; 1–2 × Goalkeeper CIWS; Missiles: 40-cell Mk 41 vertical launching system; 32 × SM-2 IIIA surface-to-air missiles; 32 × Evolved SeaSparrow missiles (quad-packed); 8 × Harpoon anti-ship missiles; 2 × twin Mk 32 Mod 9 torpedo launchers with Mk 46 Mod 5 torpedoes
- Aircraft carried: 1 × NH90 NFH helicopter

HNLMS De Zeven Provinciën (F802) is the first ship of the De Zeven Provinciën-class air defence and command frigates in service with the Royal Netherlands Navy (RNLN). There are three other ships in this class, HNLMS Tromp, HNLMS De Ruyter, and HNLMS Evertsen. De Zeven Provinciën is the eighth ship in the Royal Netherlands Navy to carry this name. The name refers to the original seven Dutch provinces which together formed the Union of Utrecht.

She was built by Damen Schelde Naval Shipbuilding (formerly the Koninklijke Schelde Groep) in Vlissingen. Her design incorporates stealth technology, as well as advanced radars of Dutch design such as SMART-L and APAR.

As of December 2009, Commander Hugo L.J. Ammerlaan is De Zeven Provinciën's commanding officer.

== Operational history ==
In December 2003, the HNLMS De Zeven, became the first vessel to successfully fire the evolved Sea Sparrow missile (ESSM) and standard missile SM2-MR block IIIA, using interrupted and continues wave illumination and X-band uplinks. Both missiles were controlled by the APAR radar.

On 21 March 2006, the container ship MV Hyundai Fortune suffered a major explosion and massive fire in the aft on-deck container stacks. When efforts to control the fire failed, the crew abandoned ship and were picked up by De Zeven Provinciën.

On 4 April 2006, De Zeven Provinciën along with the destroyer USS Roosevelt responded to MV Dong Won which reported that it had come under rocket attack off the coast of Somalia. However, the pirates had already hijacked the vessel and reached Somali territorial waters after threatening the captured crew. De Zeven Provinciën and Roosevelt continued to monitor the situation.

On 29 March 2009, as De Zeven Provinciën was part of Operation Atalanta, the German Navy tanker Spessart was attacked by 7-man pirate boat. Spessart had a 12-man security detail which exchanged fire with the pirates which repelled the attack. De Zeven Provinciën along with the German frigate Rheinland-Pfalz, Greek frigate Psara, Spanish frigate Victoria, and USS Boxer intervened. The pirates were later captured after a chase lasting a few hours.

De Zeven Provinciën provided security during the 2014 Nuclear Security Summit. That same year the ship also took part in exercises and performed tests in relation to its weapon systems.

De Zeven Provinciën participated in Exercise Formidable Shield 2021. During the exercise, she fired two RIM-162 ESSM and assisted USS Paul Ignatius in intercepting a ballistic missile using its SMART-L radar.

Between March–July 2022, De Zeven Provinciën was part of Standing NATO Maritime Group 1. She had port calls in Tallinn and Devonport.

On 9 October 2022, De Zeven Provinciën along with HNLMS Van Amstel deployed to conduct drills with the aircraft carrier USS Gerald R. Ford.

=== Live missile firings ===
De Zeven Provinciën carries the Evolved Sea Sparrow Missile (ESSM) and the SM-2 Block IIIA missile systems. The primary sensor used to guide these missile systems is APAR.

In November 2003, approximately 200 nautical miles (370 km; 230 mi) from the Azores, De Zeven Provinciën conducted her first live firings of these missile systems. The firings involved a single ESSM and a single SM-2. These firings were particularly significant in that they were the first ever live firings involving a full-size ship-borne Active Electronically Scanned Array (i.e., APAR) guiding missiles using the Interrupted Continuous Wave Illumination (ICWI) technique in an operational environment. As related by Jane's Navy International:

During the tracking and missile-firing tests, target profiles were provided by Greek-built EADS/3Sigma Iris PVK medium-range subsonic target drones. [...] According to the RNLN, ... "APAR immediately acquired the missile and maintained track until destruction". [...] These ground-breaking tests represented the world's first live verification of the ICWI technique.

Further live firings were performed by De Zeven Provinciën in March 2005, again in the Atlantic Ocean approximately 180 nautical miles (330 km; 210 mi) west of the Azores. The tests involved three live-firing events including firing a single SM-2 at an Iris target drone at long range, a single ESSM at an Iris target drone, and a two-salvo launch (with one salvo comprising two SM-2s and the other comprising two ESSMs) against two incoming Iris target drones. The long-range SM-2 engagement apparently resulted in an intercept at a range of greater than 100 km (62 mi) from the ship, with a missile-target miss distance of 8 feet (2.4 m) (the warhead's proximity fuze having been disabled for the purposes of the test).

On 24 October 2015 De Zeven Provinciën performed maritime integrated air and missile defense during a At Sea Demonstration (ASD).

In May, 2021 during At Sea Demonstration/Formidable Shield 2021 De Zeven Provinciën detected and tracked a ballistic missile with SMART-L radar and relayed the target information to USS Paul Ignatius. The Arleigh Burke-class destroyer intercepted and destroyed the ballistic missile with SM-3 surface-to-air missile. During the exercise it also performed a Plot Level Data Exchange and Fusion (PLDEF) with the French frigate Forbin.

== Gallery ==
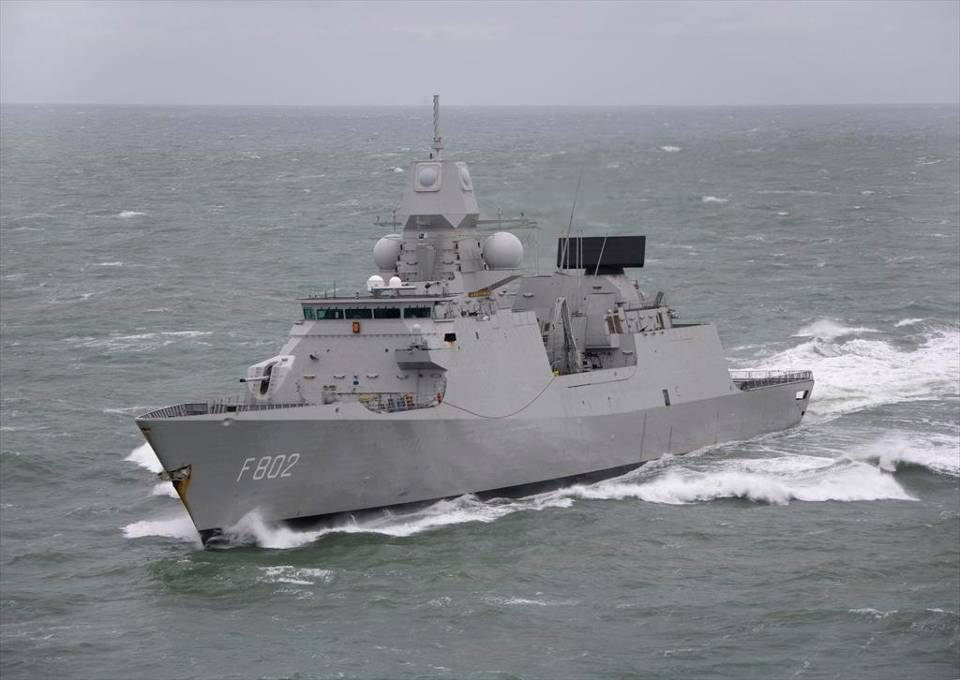
De Zeven Provinciën at the North Sea during the 2014 Nuclear Security Summit

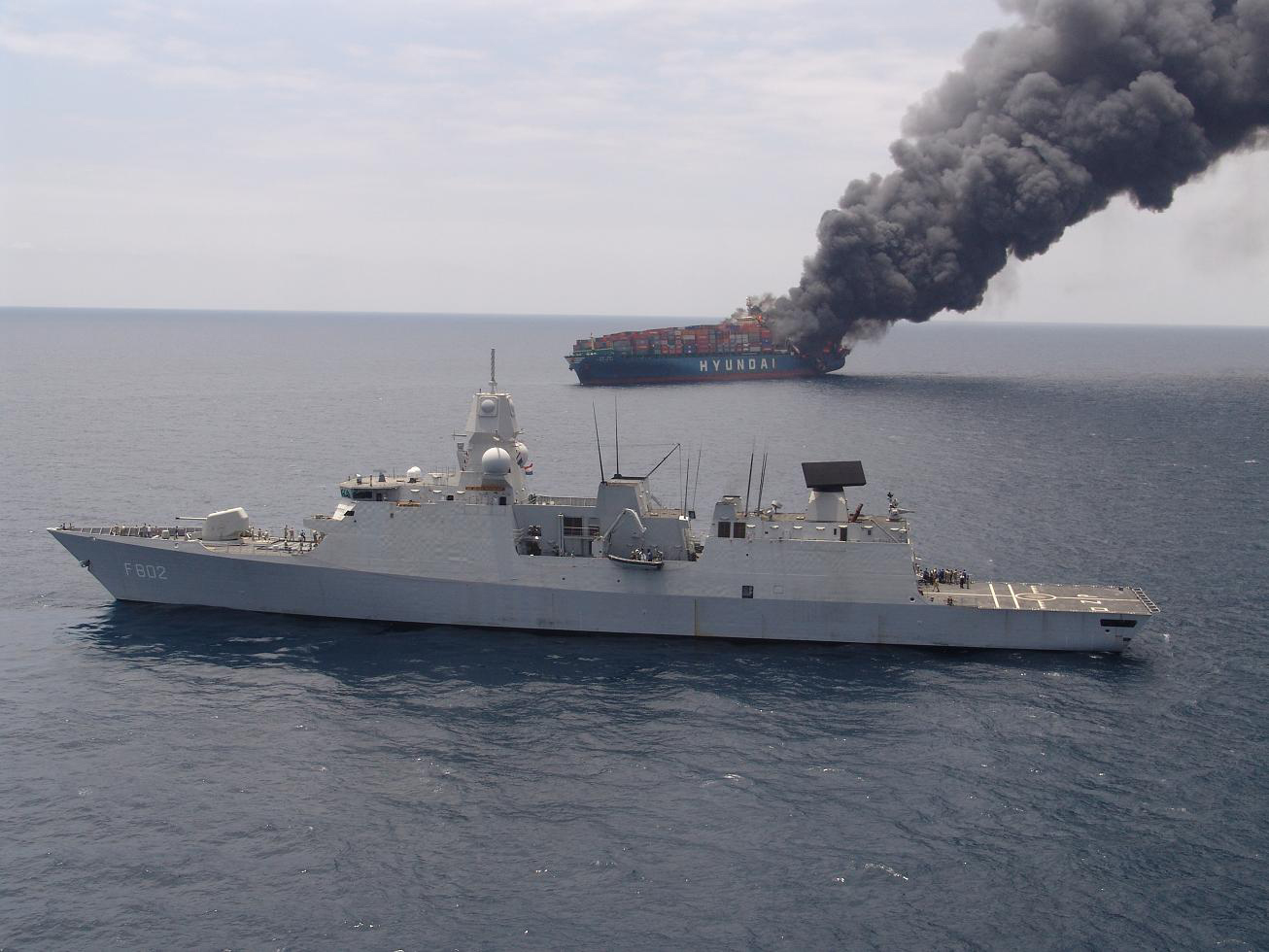
De Zeven Provinciën helps MV Hyundai Fortune (2) on 3 March 2006.

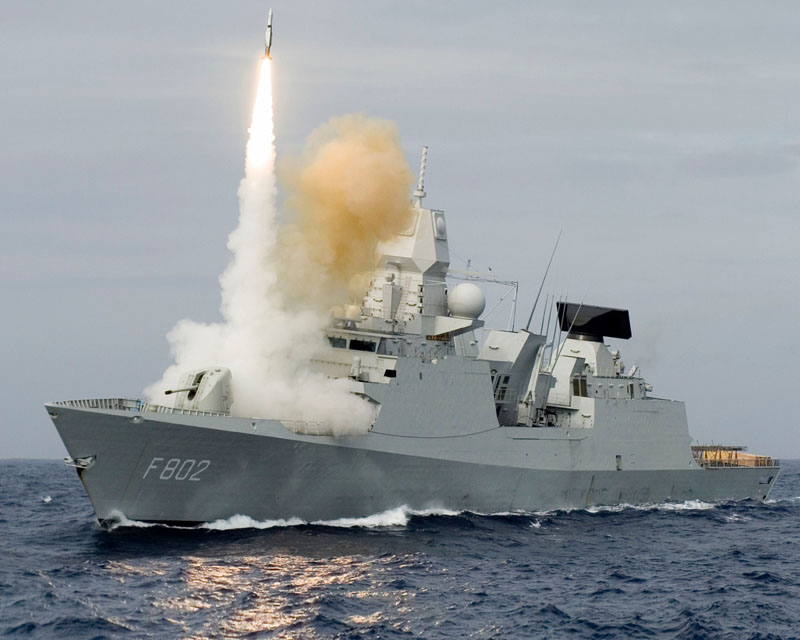
De Zeven Provinciën fires an SM-2

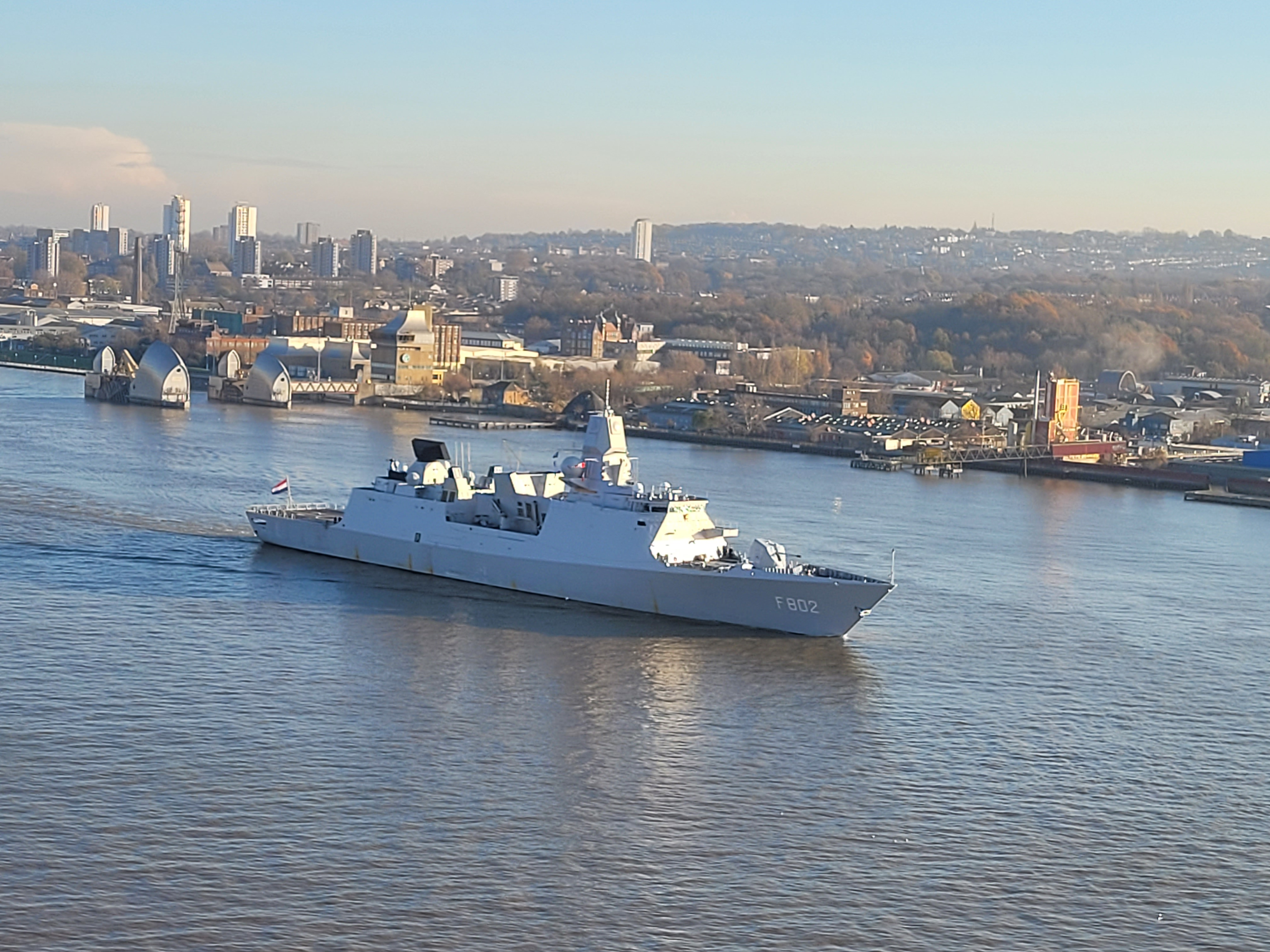
De Zeven Provinciën crossing the Thames Barrier in London
