= SAMPSON =

Multifunction, rotating AESA radar

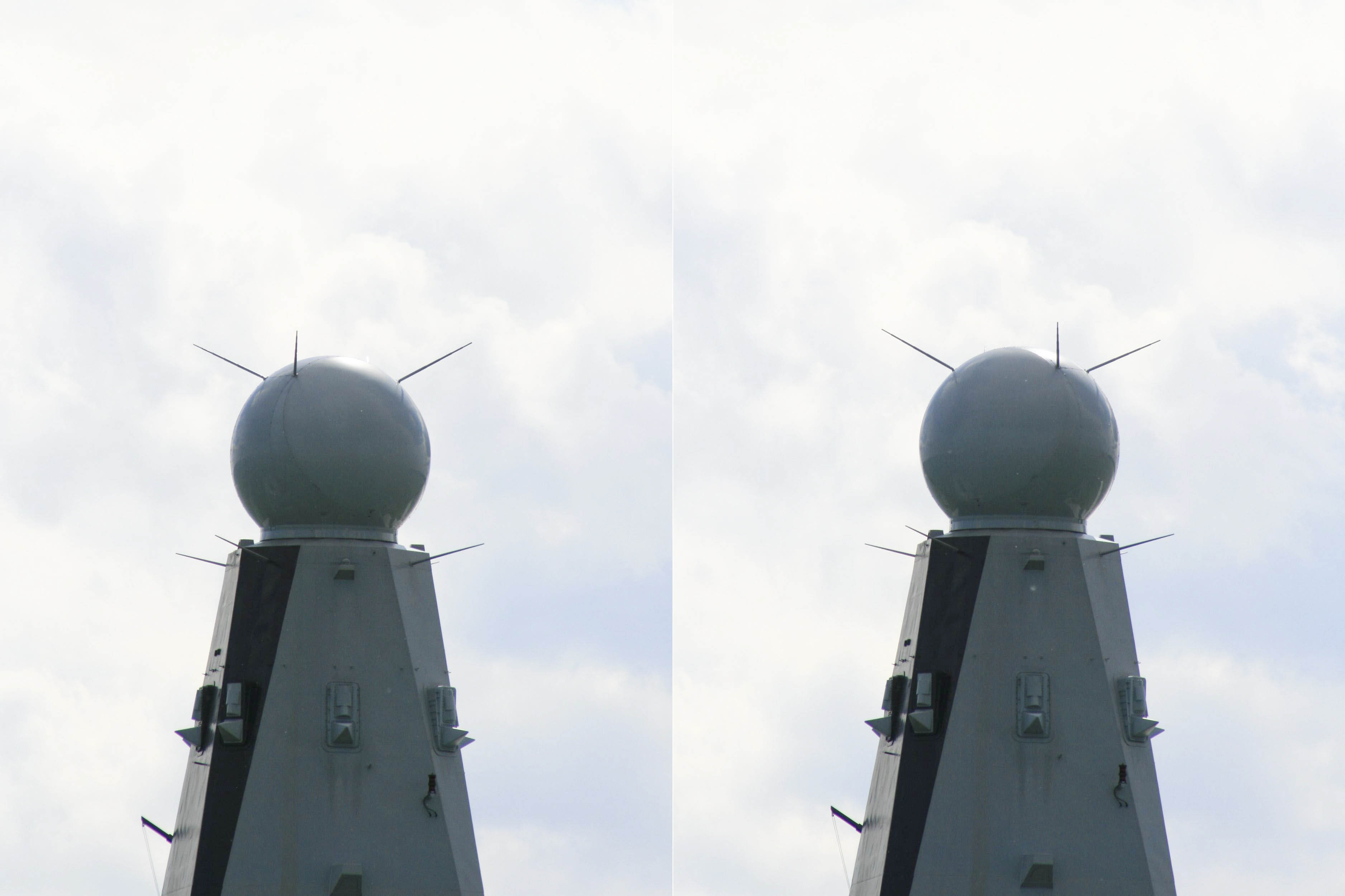
- 2012 composite photographed at less than one second interval showing SAMPSON antenna rotation.
- Country of origin: United Kingdom
- No. built: 7
- Type: Solid-state AESA radar
- Frequency: 2–4 GHz (S band)
- Range: 400 km
- Power: 25 kW

The SAMPSON is a multi-function dual-face active electronically scanned array radar produced by BAE Systems Maritime. It is the fire control radar component of the Sea Viper naval air defence system. The Sea Viper system is also known as PAAMS(S) to denote the use of the SAMPSON radar and to distinguish it from the PAAMS system on the Franco-Italian Horizon-class frigate.

The SAMPSON multifunction radar can detect air and surface targets. It has a maximum detection distance of 400 km (250 mi), and it is capable of tracking hundreds of targets at any one time. Sea Viper uses this information to assess and command target priorities and calculate the optimum launch time for its Aster missiles.

== History ==
SAMPSON is derived from the Multifunction Electronically Scanned Adaptive Radar (MESAR) programme. MESAR 1 development commenced in 1982 as a partnership between Plessey, Roke Manor Research, and the Defence Evaluation and Research Agency. Plessey was acquired by Siemens in 1989 to become Siemens-Plessey, itself acquired by British Aerospace in 1998. British Aerospace became BAE Systems in November 1999. MESAR 1 trials occurred between 1989 and 1994. MESAR 2 development began in August 1995, of which SAMPSON is a derivative.

The Royal Navy intended to deploy the SAMPSON multifunction radar (MFR) on its version of the Horizon-class frigate (also known as Common New Generation Frigate or CNGF), a collaboration with France and Italy to produce anti-air warfare warships. Following delays and complications, the UK withdrew and started its own Type 45 programme. The Type 45 destroyer uses the SAMPSON radar with the PAAMS missile system, which was also developed for the Horizon frigates (French and Italian ships are to be fitted with the EMPAR MFR). The SAMPSON Radar is made in Cowes, Isle of Wight.

In September 2013, Type 45 destroyer HMS Daring was positioned near missile launch sites at US Army Kwajalein Atoll to take part in a trial assessing SAMPSON's ability to detect and track ballistic missiles, a capability it was not originally intended to have. During the trial, the system successfully detected two simulated medium-range ballistic missiles. Director of the UK Missile Defence Centre, Simon Pavitt, said, "This work has raised the profile of the Ballistic Missile Defence potential [...] and will support an ongoing Missile Defence Centre programme to further explore key issues."

== Operation ==
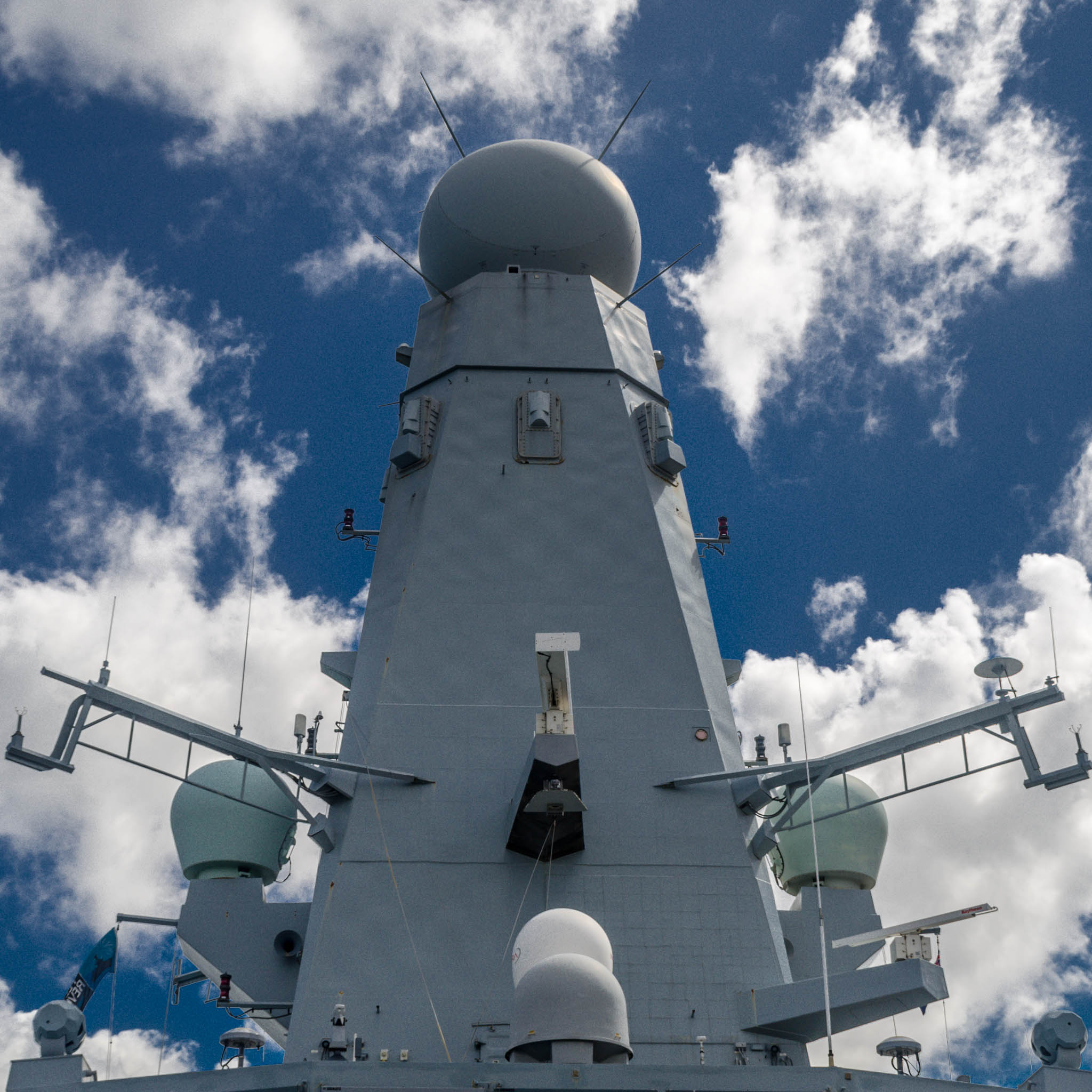
The mainmast of HMS Daring showing the SAMPSON multi-function AESA radar

Conventional radars, consisting of a rotating transmitter and sensor, have limited power, are vulnerable to enemy jamming, and perform only one function—with separate units therefore required for surveillance, tracking, and targeting.

As an active array, SAMPSON uses software to shape and direct its beam, allowing several functions to be carried out at once and, through adaptive waveform control, is virtually immune to enemy jamming. Active arrays have both longer range and higher accuracy than conventional radars. The beam-directing software uses sophisticated algorithms to schedule searches so that the potentially hundreds of active tracks are maintained with maximum accuracy.

The SAMPSON uses two planar arrays to provide coverage over only part of the sky; complete coverage is provided by rotating the arrays, similar to the way conventional radar systems operate. This is in contrast to the US AN/SPY-1 (as used on the Ticonderoga-class cruiser and Flight I–IIA Arleigh Burke-class destroyer) and AN/SPY-6 (as used on the Flight III Arleigh Burke-class destroyer) or the Dutch APAR system (as used on the Royal Netherlands Navy's De Zeven Provinciën-class frigate, the German Navy's Sachsen-class frigate, and the Royal Danish Navy's Iver Huitfeldt-class frigate), which use multiple arrays fixed in place to provide continuous coverage of the entire sky.

Although the SAMPSON radar does not provide continuous 360-degree coverage, it rotates at 30 revolutions per minute, and with two back-to-back arrays, no part of the sky lacks coverage for more than half a second on average (the precise time varies as the beams can also be swept back and forth electronically). In addition, the use of a smaller number of arrays allows the system to be much lighter, allowing placement of the arrays at the top of a prominent mast rather than on the side of the superstructure as in the Dutch or US ships. Placing any radar emitter at a higher altitude extends the horizon distance, improving performance against low-level or sea-skimming targets; SAMPSON is at approximately double the height above the waterline than the arrays of equivalent ships in foreign navies. Although precise details of the SAMPSON's performance in this regard are unlikely to enter the public domain, such factors may mitigate the disadvantages of fewer arrays.

Some tasks are difficult to combine: for example, (long-range) volume search consumes substantial radar resources, leaving little room for other tasks like targeting. Combining volume search with other tasks also results either in slow search rates or in low overall quality per task. Driving parameters in radar performance is time-on-target or observation time per beam. This led to the Royal Navy selecting the S1850M long-range radar to complement SAMPSON on the Type 45 destroyers. This also resulted in the NATO Anti-Air Warfare System study (NAAWS) defining the preferred AAW system as consisting of a complementary Volume Search Radar and MFR. This gives the added advantage that the two systems can use two different radar frequencies; one being a good choice for long-range search, the other a good choice for an MFR (physics makes both tasks difficult to combine).

The first Type 45, HMS Daring, was launched on February 1, 2006. The ship was fitted with SAMPSON and S1850M radars in 2007 and was commissioned on 23 July 2009.

=== Modes ===
- Long and medium-range search
- Surface picture search
- High-speed horizon search
- High-angle search and track
- Multiple target tracking and multiple channel fire control; 1000 targets can be tracked

== See also ==
- Phased array
- Active electronically scanned array
- Active phased array radar
- AN/SPY-3
- AN/SPY-6
- EL/M-2248 MF-STAR
- EMPAR
- OPS-24
- OPS-50
- Selex RAT-31DL
- Selex RAN-40L
- Type 346 Radar
