= AN/SPY-3 =

Electronically scanned radar system

- Country of origin: United States
- Type: Navigation/Targeting
- Frequency: X band
- Range: 200 mi (320 km)

The AN/SPY-3 is an active electronically scanned array radar manufactured by Raytheon and designed for both blue-water and littoral operations.

In accordance with the Joint Electronics Type Designation System (JETDS), the "AN/SPY-3" designation represents the 3rd design of an Army-Navy electronic device for surface ship surveillance radar system. The JETDS system also now is used to name all Department of Defense electronic systems.

== Technology ==
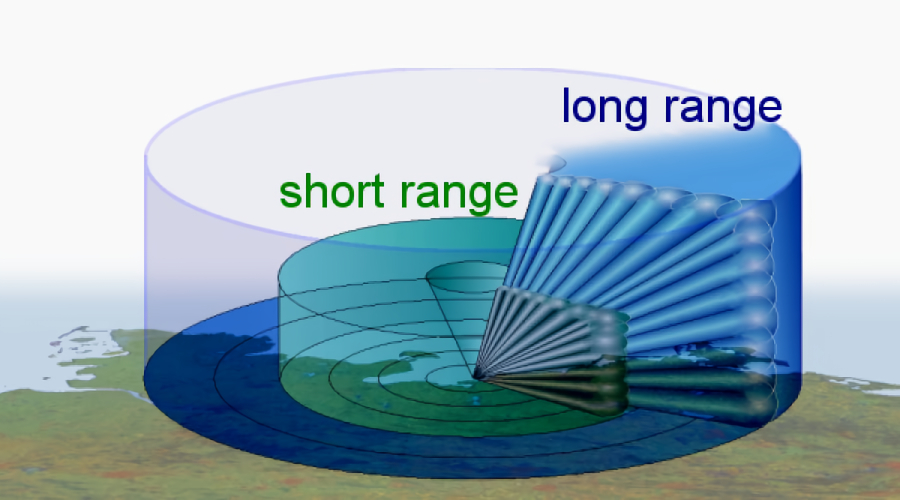
Diagram of AN/SPY-3 vertical electronic pencil beam radar conex projections

X band functionality (8 to 12 GHz frequency range) is optimal for minimizing low-altitude propagation effects, narrow beam width for best tracking accuracy, wide frequency bandwidth for effective target discrimination, and the target illumination for SM-2 and Evolved Sea Sparrow Missiles (ESSM). The X-band has, in general, favorable low-altitude propagation characteristics, which readily support the horizon search functionality of the AN/SPY-3. A large operating bandwidth is required to mitigate large propagation variations due to meteorological conditions.

The system uses commercial off the shelf (COTS) computers and has reduced manning requirements for operation and maintenance. A number of operation and maintenance functions can be completely automated. Commercial IBM System p (Regatta) series symmetric multiprocessor (SMP) servers, ruggedized for the shipboard environment, provide the low-latency computing throughput (rapid sensor-to-shooter loop closure) and high productivity software engineering environment.

The system was introduced in the new Zumwalt-class destroyers and Gerald R. Ford-class aircraft carriers. On both of these classes, the AN/SPY-3 was originally to be combined with the S Band AN/SPY-4 under the designator "Dual Band Radar". In June 2010, Pentagon acquisition chief Ashton Carter announced that they will be removing the SPY-4 S-band Volume Search Radar (VSR) from the DDG 1000's dual-band radar to reduce costs as part of the Nunn-McCurdy certification process. Due to the SPY-4 removal, SPY-3 radar is to have software modifications so as to perform a volume search functionality.

Shipboard operators will be able to optimize the SPY-3 MFR for either horizon search or volume search. While optimized for volume search, the horizon search capability is limited. Without the VSR, DDG-1000 is still expected to perform local area air defense. USS Gerald R. Ford (CVN-78) aircraft carrier will be the only ship to have both radars married in one system.

AN/SPY-3 was also under consideration for retrofit to existing ships (USS Makin Island (LHD-8), Nimitz-class aircraft carriers, and San Antonio-class amphibious transport docks), as well for installation in future LH(X) America-class amphibious assault ship.

== Replacement ==
Starting with USS John F. Kennedy (CVN-79), SPY-4 has been replaced with AN/SPY-6 radar from Raytheon.

== See also ==
- List of radars
- DD(X)
- CG(X)
- Sea-based X-band Radar
- Phased array
- Active electronically scanned array
- Active phased array radar
- AN/SPY-6
- EL/M-2248 MF-STAR
- OPS-24
- OPS-50
- SAMPSON
- Selex RAT-31DL
- Selex RAN-40L
- List of military electronics of the United States
