= EL/M-2248 MF-STAR =

Israeli naval defense radar system

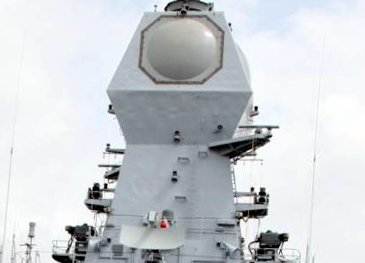
- EL/M-2248 MF-STAR on board a Kolkata-class destroyer of the Indian Navy
- Country of origin: Israel
- Type: Solid-state Multifunction Naval AESA radar
- Frequency: S band
- Range: >450 km Automatic track initiation at >250 km for high altitude fighter size aircraft. 25+ km (13.5+ nm) against sea skimming missiles.
- Azimuth: 0–360°
- Elevation: -20° to +85°

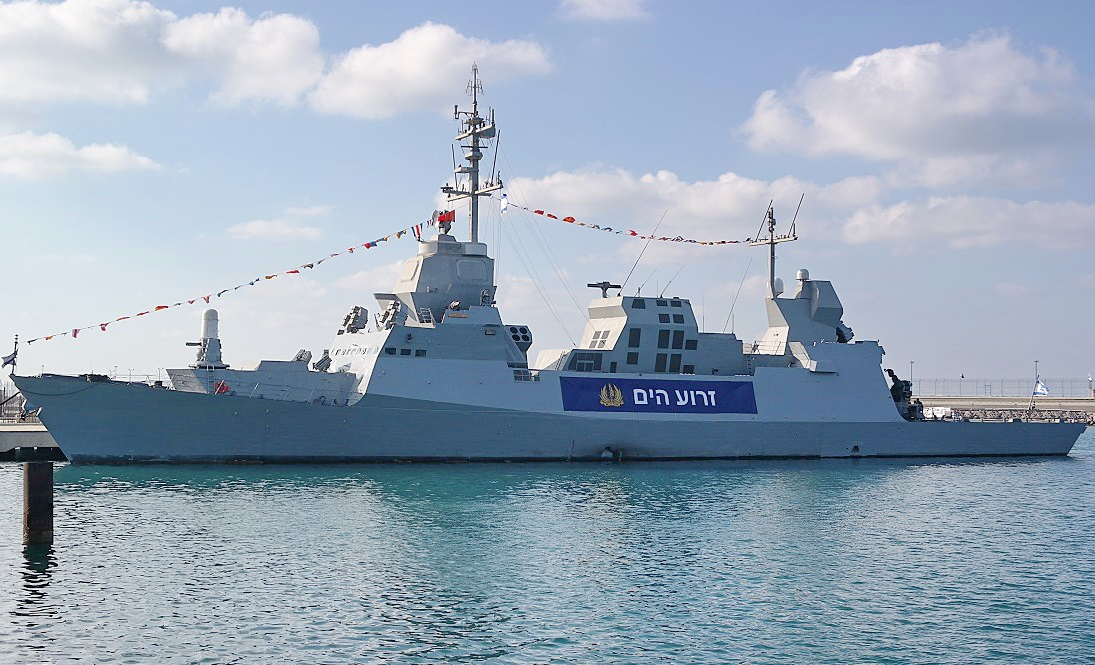
EL/M-2248 MF-STAR atop INS Lahav of the Israeli Navy

The EL/M-2248 MF-STAR is a GaN based multifunction active electronically scanned array naval radar system developed by IAI Elta for maritime installation on warships. It is capable of tracking both air and surface targets and providing fire control guidance. MF-STAR is an acronym of Multi-Function Surveillance, Track And Guidance Radar.

== Design and description ==
The EL/M-2248 MF-STAR is a multifunction solid-state Active electronically scanned array (AESA) radar developed for a new generation of naval platforms. The radar system is made up of 4 active arrays operating in the S-band, each of the 4 arrays is positioned in one direction. The radar employs multi-beam and pulse Doppler techniques, as well as robust Electronic counter-countermeasures techniques to extract low radar cross-section targets from complex clutter and jamming environments. AESA radars provide a low probability of intercept of emitted signals and help the ships remain stealthy. Weighing only seven tons, the system can be installed on smaller vessels of corvette size and above.

The MF-STAR is capable of tracking both air and surface targets and can track hundreds of targets simultaneously with a very fast refresh rate. It is capable of providing guidance illumination and mid course updates to both active and semi-active surface-to-air missiles and anti-ship missiles, with multiple simultaneous engagement capability. It is also capable of automatic splash detection and correction for naval gunnery support.

While targets are tracked at long range threats are automatically recognized at medium range and automatic track initiation takes place. Sea skimming attacking missile are tracked at >25 km while high flying fighter aircraft are automatically tracked at >250 km.

=== Performance and Parameters ===
Parameters	Corvette Version	Frigate Version
Range	>250 km	>450 km
Azimuth coverage	360^{o}	360^{o}
Elevation coverage	-20^{o} to +85^{o}	-20^{o} to +85^{o}
Weight above deck	500 kg per face	2000 kg per face
Weight below deck	1300 kg	4000 kg
Antenna size	1x2 m	3x3 m

== Operators ==
India

- Kolkata-class destroyer
- Visakhapatnam-class destroyer
- INS Vikrant
- Nilgiri-class frigate

Israel

- Sa'ar 5-class corvette (only on INS Lahav)
- Sa'ar 6-class corvette

Republic of Korea

- ROKS Marado

== See also ==
- EL/M-2258 ALPHA (rotating variant of ELM-2248)
- EL/M-2080 Green Pine
- EL/M-2238 STAR
- Barak 8
- Phased array
- Active electronically scanned array
- Active phased array radar
- AN/SPY-3
- AN/SPY-6
- OPS-24
- OPS-50
- SAMPSON
- Selex RAT-31DL
- Selex RAN-40L
- Type 346 Radar
