= MV Hyundai Fortune =

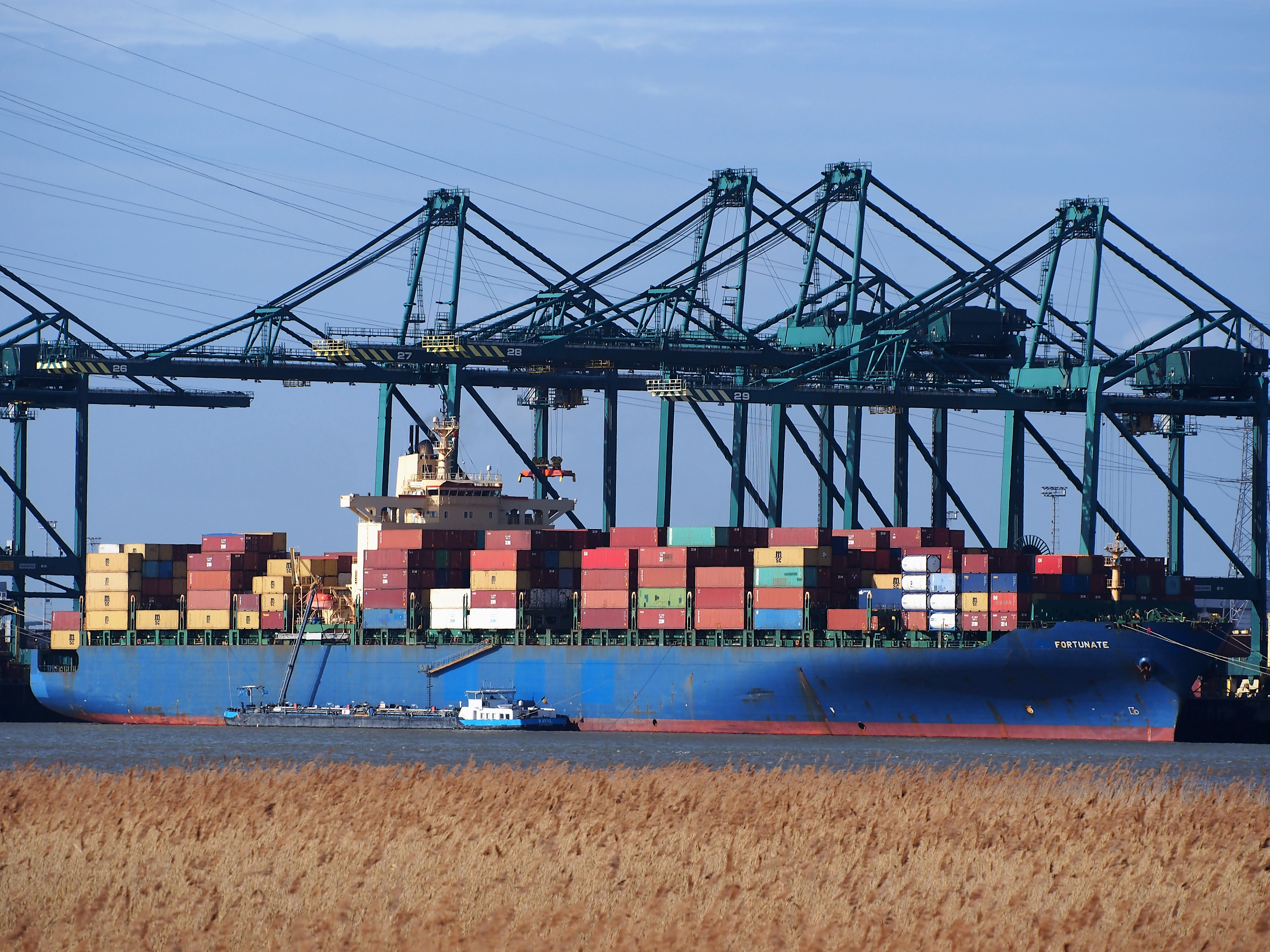
- MV Fortunate at the Port of Antwerp, Belgium in March 2017

History
- Name: Fortunate 2015-2018; MSC Fortunate 2009–2015; Fortune 2006–2009; Hyundai Fortune 1996-2006
- Owner: Kosmo SVCS Inc.; EMF International S.A. 1996-2006
- Operator: Kosmo SVCS Inc.; Hyundai Merchant Marine 1996-2006
- Port of registry: Panama
- Builder: Hyundai Heavy Industries; Ulsan, South Korea
- Launched: 22 June 1996
- Completed: August 1996
- Out of service: 2018
- Identification: Call sign: 3FLG6; IMO number: 9112272; MMSI no.: 356703000
- Fate: Scrapped in 2018

General characteristics
- Tonnage: 64,054 GT; 35,490 NT; 68,363 DWT
- Length: 274.2 m (900 ft)
- Beam: 40 m (130 ft)
- Draught: 24.2 ft (7.4 m)
- Speed: 25.6 kts
- Capacity: 5,551 TEU

MV MSC Fortunate (formerly MV Fortune and MV Hyundai Fortune), was a container ship owned by Kosmo SVCS Inc., and previously registered to Hyundai Merchant Marine. She was completed in August 1996 and sailed under the flag of Panama. She had a gross tonnage of 64,054 and was capable of speeds of up to 25 knots. Her cargo capacity was 5,551 twenty-foot equivalent units (TEU).

As Hyundai Fortune, she was severely damaged in a fire at sea on 21 March 2006. After repairs, she returned to service as a container ship until being scrapped in 2018.

== Fire ==
On 21 March 2006, the vessel was en route from ports in China and Singapore through the Gulf of Aden about 60 miles (97 km) south of the coast of Yemen. She was sailing west towards the Suez Canal on the way to ports in Europe. Around 1235 UTC, an explosion of unknown origin occurred below deck, aft of the accommodation, causing 60 to 90 containers to fall into the ocean. The explosion caused a fire that spread through the stern of the ship, including the accommodation and the container stacks in front of the accommodation. Secondary explosions followed as seven containers full of fireworks also ignited above deck on the stern.

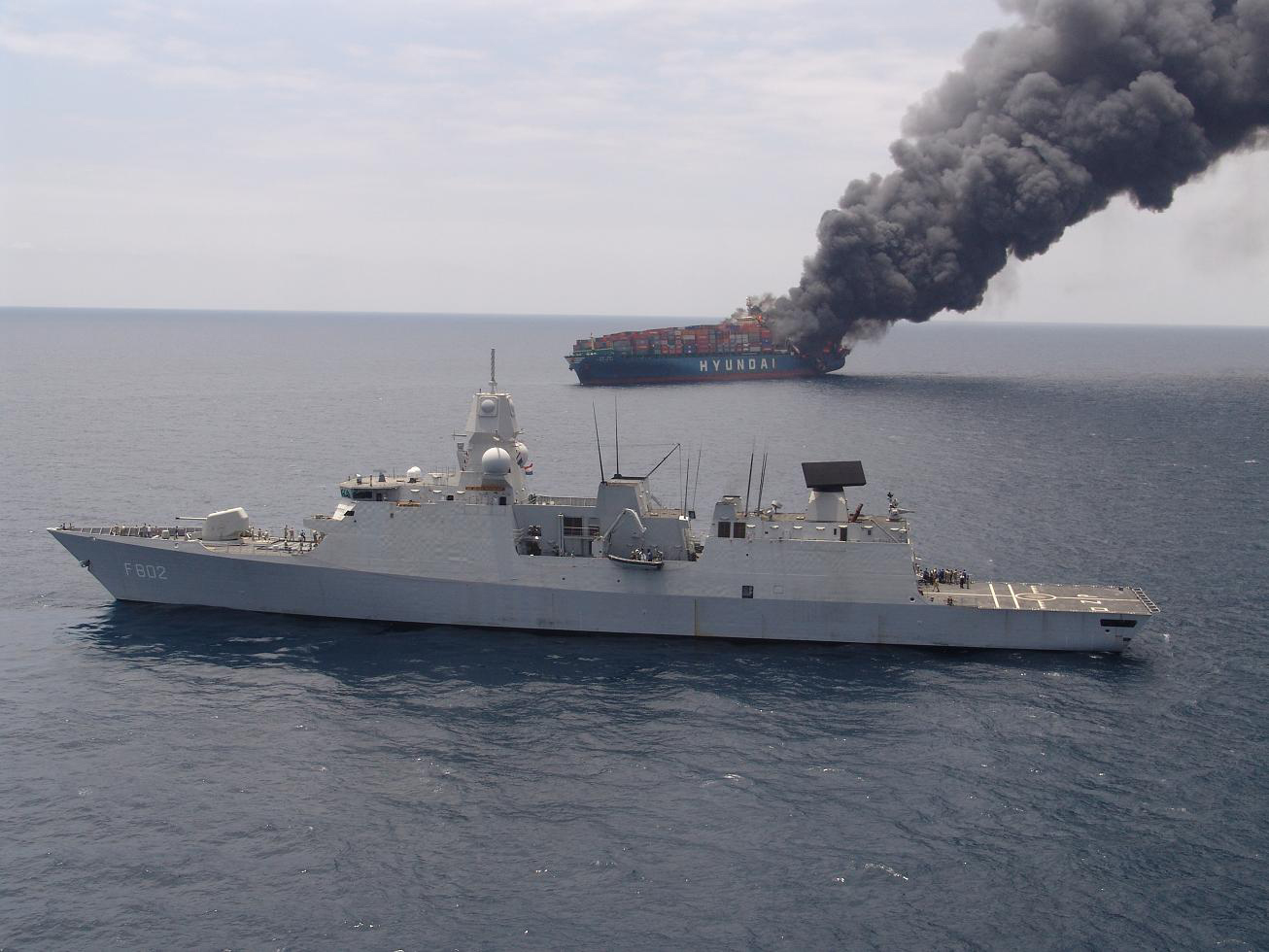
MV Hyundai Fortune on fire, with HNLMS De Zeven Provinciën in the foreground, 2006.

Photos of the blazing ship showed a large section of the hull had been blown out below deck but above the waterline on the port side.

After efforts to contain the fire with the ship's water based suppression system failed, all 27 crew members abandoned ship and were rescued by the Dutch frigate HNLMS De Zeven Provinciën, which was performing maritime security operations in the area as part of Operation Enduring Freedom. One sailor was evacuated to the French aircraft carrier Charles de Gaulle with injuries that were not life-threatening.

On 23 March, firefighting tugs began to arrive on the scene. With her engine room burned and completely flooded, the listing Hyundai Fortune continued to burn for several days.

General average was declared and at least one third of the containers were damaged by the blaze. Every container aft of the superstructure was either incinerated or lost overboard. Most of the containers forward of the superstructure were left intact, although after the ship lost power, any cargo in the refrigerated containers would have spoiled. An estimated 10 percent of the cargo was uninsured.

The combined cost of the ship and lost cargo is estimated at over $800 million US. The ship was eventually towed to Salalah, Oman and 2,249 salvageable containers were offloaded for transhipment to Europe.

According to a statement to the US House of Representatives Homeland Security Appropriations Committee, "The cause of the fire is believed to have been a container loaded with petroleum-based cleaning fluids stowed near the engine room. The shipper failed to indicate the hazardous nature of this shipment to Hyundai Fortune, undoubtedly to avoid the special handling fees associated with transporting hazardous materials."

== Repairs ==
The vessel was renamed Fortune and temporarily repaired for being towed to China for final repairs and refurbishing, including 5,000 tonnes of new steel and a new accommodation block.

The ship was repaired at COSCO Zhoushan Shipyard in Liuhen Dao Island in China in 2007-2008. In the course of the repairs the stern tube was confirmed to be nearly 100 mm lower than the main engine thrust sightline. With the technical assistance of Tecnitas of Bureau Veritas and BF Consultant of France, the ship repair yard straightened the hull and brought the stern tube back in line, for it to be final machined at a later stage of the rebuilding of the vessel.

The vessel was eventually delivered to its owner and resumed its activity as a container carrier. In 2018, she was scrapped in Alang.
