= HNLMS Evertsen (F805) =

Dutch Frigate

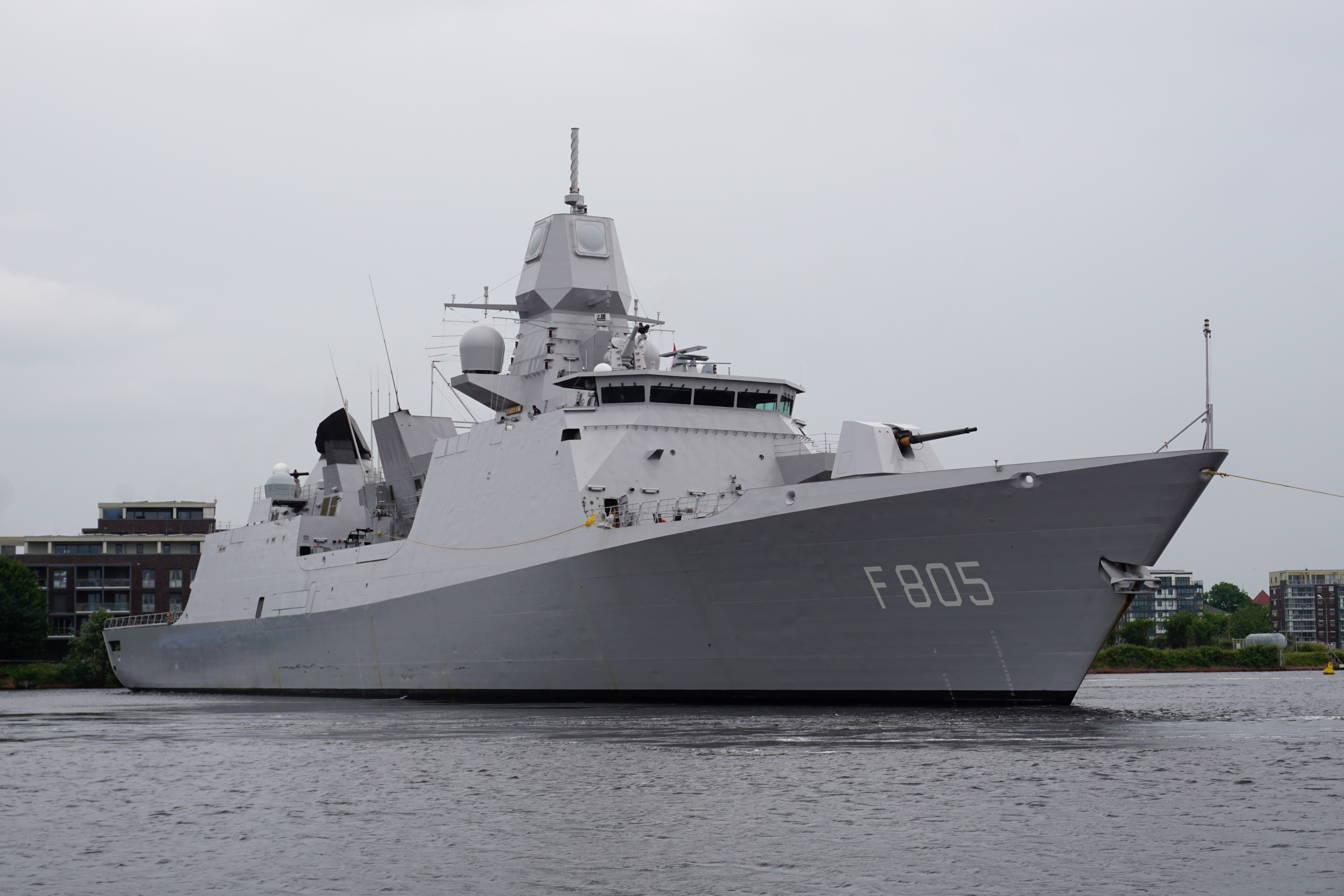
- HNLMS Evertsen in Wilhelmshaven in 2025.

History

Netherlands
- Name: Evertsen
- Namesake: Evertsen family
- Builder: Damen Schelde Naval Shipbuilding
- Laid down: 6 September 2001
- Launched: 19 April 2003
- Commissioned: 10 June 2005
- Identification: MMSI number: 244942000; Callsign: PAEU
- Status: In service
- Badge

General characteristics
- Class & type: De Zeven Provinciën-class frigate
- Displacement: 6,050 tonnes (full load)
- Length: 144.24 m (473.2 ft)
- Beam: 18.80 m (61.7 ft)
- Draught: 5.18 m (17.0 ft)
- Propulsion: Combined diesel or gas; 2 × Wärtsilä 16 V26 marine diesel engines, 5.1 MW (6,800 hp) each; 2 × Rolls-Royce Marine Spey SM 1C gas turbines, 19.5 MW (26,100 hp) each; 2 × propeller shafts, 5-bladed controllable pitch propellers
- Speed: 28 knots (52 km/h; 32 mph)
- Complement: 174 (202 incl. command staff)
- Sensors & processing systems: Thales Nederland SMART-L long-range air and surface surveillance radar; Thales Nederland APAR air and surface search, tracking and guidance radar (I band); DECCA NAV navigation radar; Thales Nederland Scout (Low-probability-of-intercept) surface search/navigation radar; Thales Nederland Sirius IRST long-range infrared surveillance and tracking system; Thales Nederland Mirador optical surveillance and tracking system; Atlas Elektronik DSQS-24C hull-mounted sonar; MK XII IFF system
- Armament: Guns: 1 × Oto Melara 127 mm/64 dual-purpose gun; 2–4 × Browning M2 12.7 mm machine guns; 4–6 × FN MAG 7.62 mm machine guns; 2 × Goalkeeper CIWS; Missiles: 40-cell Mk 41 vertical launching system; 32 × SM-2 IIIA surface-to-air missiles; 32 × Evolved SeaSparrow missiles (quad-packed); 8 × Harpoon anti-ship missiles; 2 × twin Mk 32 Mod 9 torpedo launchers with Mk 46 Mod 5 torpedoes
- Aircraft carried: 1 x NH90 NFH helicopter

HNLMS Evertsen (F805) (Dutch: Zr.Ms. Evertsen) is the fourth De Zeven Provinciën-class frigate of the Royal Netherlands Navy.

== Design ==
=== Modifications ===
In July 2023, the new Otobreda 127/64 naval gun for the Evertsen was delivered. This gun would replace the old Otobreda 127/54 Compact naval gun. In March 2025, it was reported that the new naval gun had been installed on the ship.

== Service history ==
Evertsen visited South Africa in late 2007 as part of a NATO task force on a friendship visit. From February till June 2008 she was patrolling the Somali waters for the World Food Programme. The ship was back in these same waters in 2009 for Operation Atalanta. In early December 2009, she was involved in the capture of a group of Somali pirates, who had allegedly attacked the merchant ship BBC Togo.

In 2014, Commander Jos Oppeneer became HNLMS Evertsen's commanding officer.

In 2017, Evertsen was active in the Baltic Sea as part of Standing NATO Maritime Group 1.

In October 2020, the ship served a defensive role as part of the HMS Queen Elizabeth Task Group for GROUPEX and Joint Warrior Exercises. She became one of eight ships escorting the British aircraft carrier, including six other Royal Navy vessels and the US destroyer USS The Sullivans. In a statement, Commanding Officer Cdr Rick Ongering praised the close and long-standing relationship between both navies.

In 2021, Evertsen joined UK Carrier Strike Group 21 on a deployment to the Asia-Pacific. The aircraft carrier was also accompanied by six British ships, a British submarine and an American destroyer. The ships sailed from Portsmouth to the Mediterranean Sea, where an exercise followed with the fleet of the French aircraft carrier Charles de Gaulle. The strike group crossed the South China Sea to Japan via the Suez Canal, India and Singapore. A number of ships, including Evertsen, made an interim visit to the Black Sea. During the visit to the Black Sea, Russian jets conducted mock attacks on the frigate.

On 29 August 2024, a fire broke out on board the Evertsen while undergoing maintenance in Den Helder. It was first reported as a major fire, but a day later was revealed to be contained to an exhaust pipe of a generator with minimal damage.

On 3 March 2026 the Dutch government received a request from France to support the French aircraft carrier Charles de Gaulle in the eastern Mediterranean with HNLMS Evertsen. The aircraft carrier was deployed to Cyprus as a result of the Iran War. While the Dutch government was taking the request in consideration, the Evertsen had already been sent to the eastern Mediterranean alongside Charles de Gaulle. On 9 March 2026 it was announced that the Evertsen will support Charles de Gaulle and other naval ships that are part of the carrier strike group. In addition, it will also provide missile defense against attacks by Iran on European Union member states and NATO allies in the region.

In April 2026 it was reported that Evertsen had successfully neutralised an airborne drone during an air defence exercise near Crete. During the exercise the frigate launched a surface-to-air missile and made use of the Goalkeeper. That same month it was also reported that a Dutch regional broadcaster was able to track the frigate in real time via a Bluetooth tracker that was sent to the ship by military mail. On 13 May Evertsen arrived at the Nieuwe Haven Naval Base in Den Helder after being deployed for nine weeks.

On 27 September 2026 Evertsen left Den Helder to journey towards the Middle East. After the ship has arrived, she will support existing missions such as Operation Aspides and Operation Atalanta.

== Gallery ==
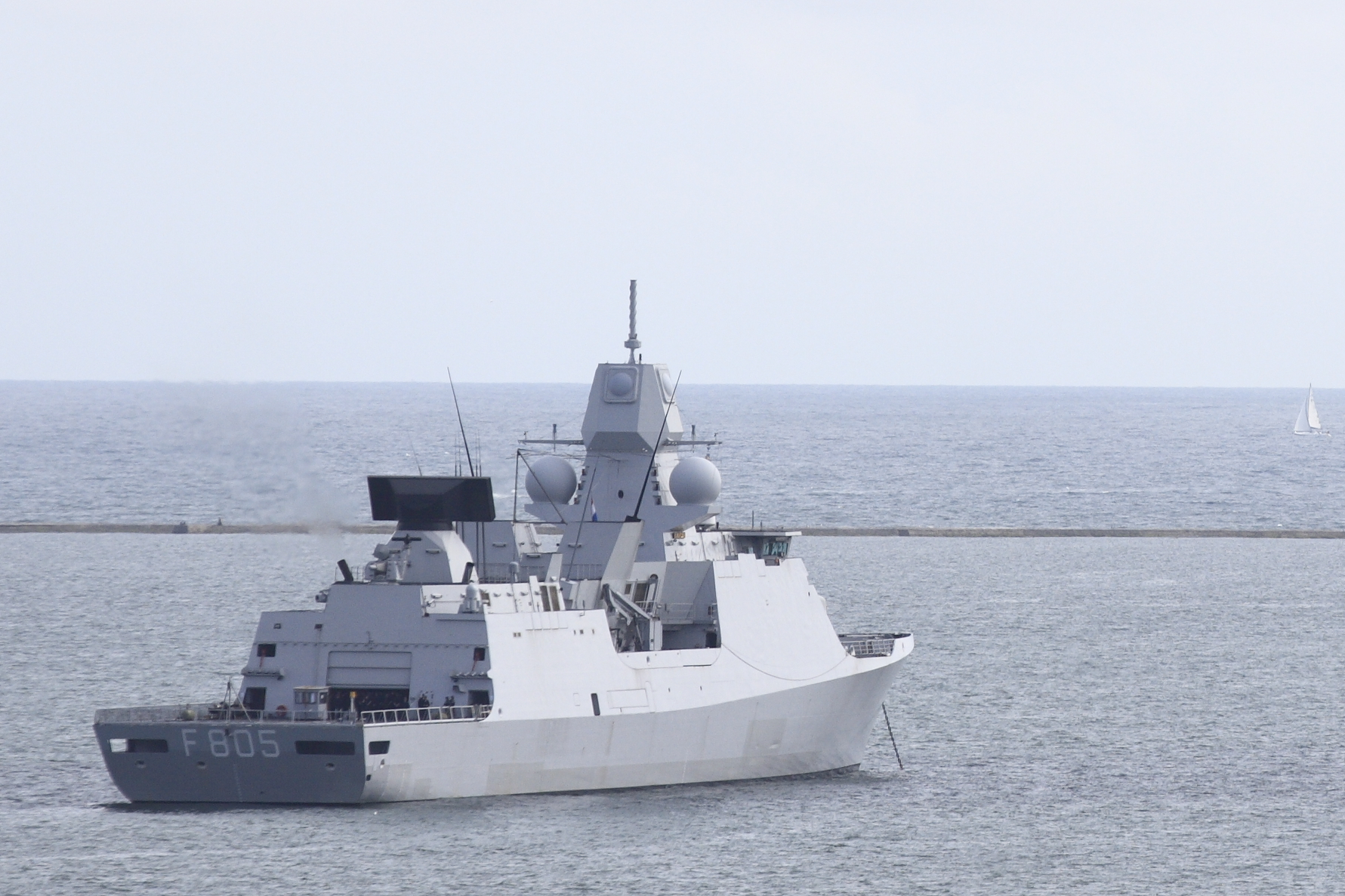
Evertsen at anchor near Plymouth Hoe, England, in May 2007

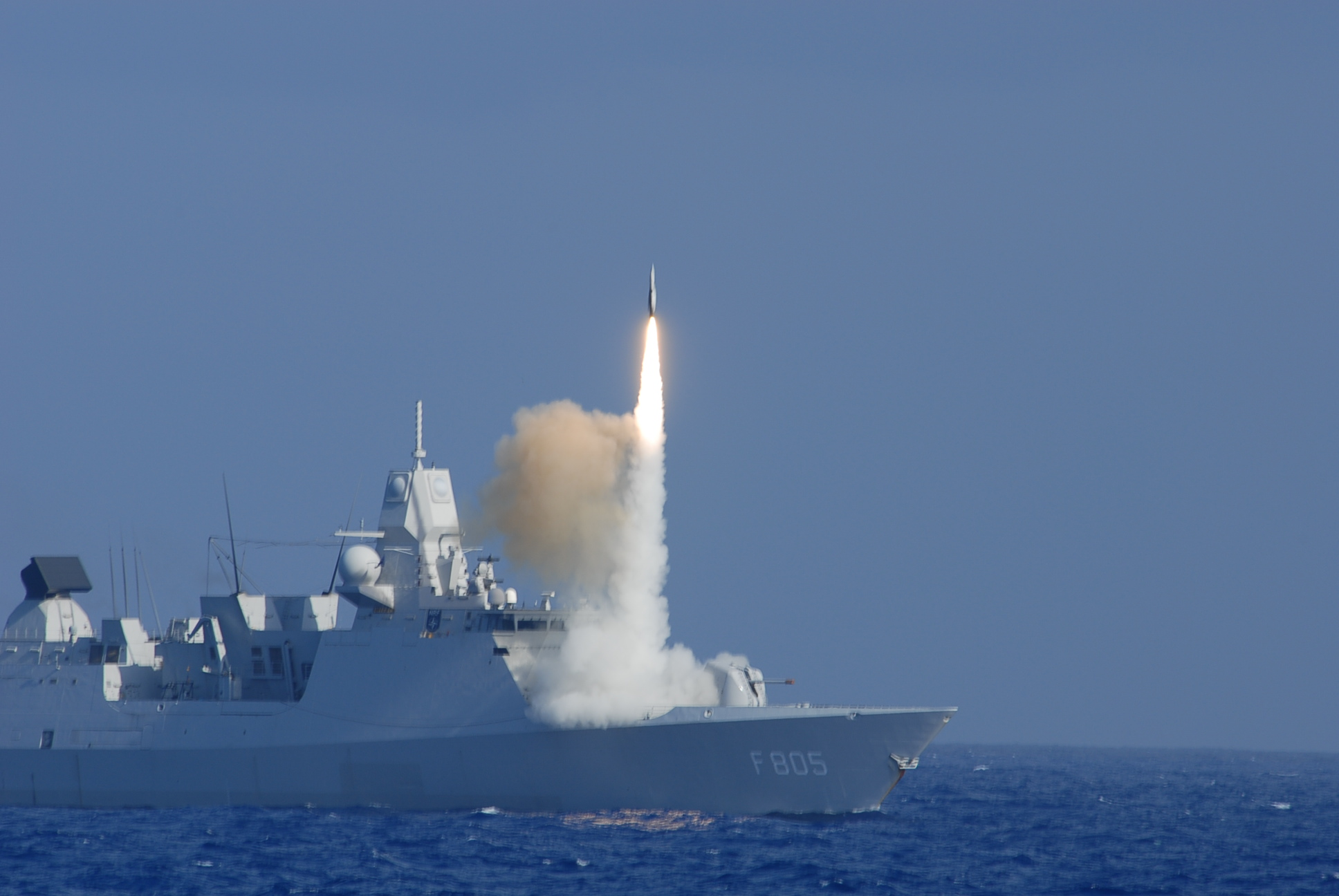
Evertsen fires a SM-2

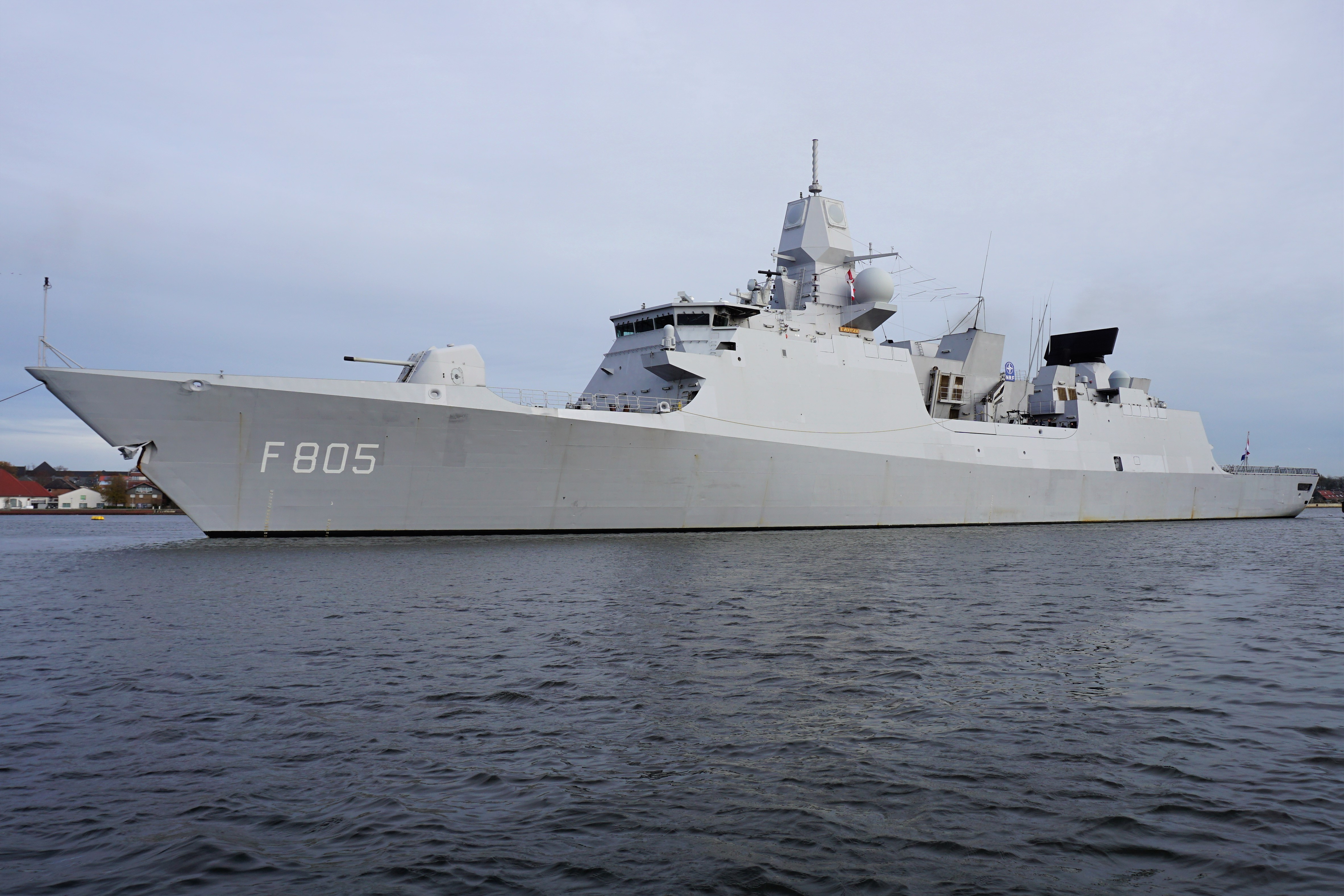
Evertsen at the magnetic measurement facility in Wilhelmshaven

== See also ==
- List of frigate classes in service
