= HNLMS Tromp (F803) =

Frigate

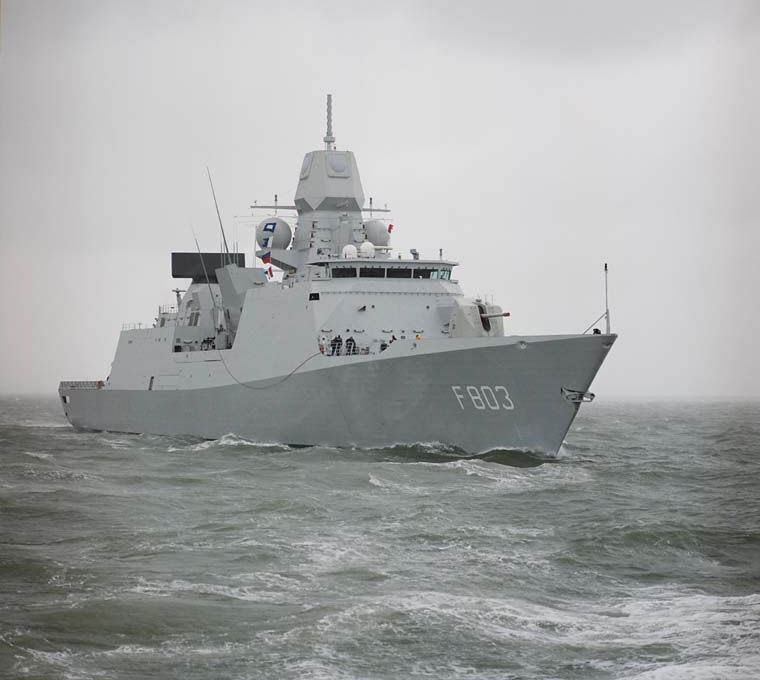
- HNLMS Tromp at sea

History

Netherlands
- Name: Tromp
- Namesake: Maarten Tromp and Cornelis Tromp
- Laid down: 3 September 1999
- Launched: 7 April 2001
- Commissioned: 14 March 2003
- Identification: MMSI number: 244899000; Callsign: PAET
- Honours and awards: KNMI Medal
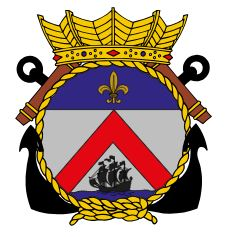
- Badge

General characteristics
- Class & type: De Zeven Provinciën-class frigate
- Displacement: 6,050 tonnes (full load)
- Length: 144.24 metres (473.2 ft)
- Beam: 18.80 metres (61.7 ft)
- Draft: 5.18 metres (17.0 ft)
- Propulsion: Combined diesel or gas; 2 × Wärtsilä 16 V26 marine diesel engines, 5.1 MW (6,800 hp) each; 2 × Rolls-Royce Marine Spey SM 1C gas turbines, 19.5 MW (26,100 hp) each; 2 × propeller shafts, 5-bladed controllable pitch propellers
- Speed: 30 knots (56 km/h; 35 mph)
- Complement: 174 (202 incl. command staff)
- Sensors & processing systems: Thales Nederland SMART-L long-range air and surface surveillance radar; Thales Nederland APAR air and surface search, tracking and guidance radar (I band); DECCA NAV navigation radar; Thales Nederland Scout (Low-probability-of-intercept) surface search/navigation radar; Thales Nederland Sirius IRST long-range infrared surveillance and tracking system; Thales Nederland Mirador optical surveillance and tracking system; Atlas Elektronik DSQS-24C hull-mounted sonar; MK XII IFF system
- Armament: Guns: 1 × Oto Melara 127 mm/54 dual-purpose gun; 2–4 × Browning M2 12.7 mm machine guns; 4–6 × FN MAG 7.62 mm machine guns; 1–2 × Goalkeeper CIWS; Missiles: 40-cell Mk 41 vertical launching system; 32 × SM-2 IIIA surface-to-air missiles; 32 × Evolved SeaSparrow missiles (quad-packed); 8 × Harpoon anti-ship missiles; 2 × twin Mk 32 Mod 9 torpedo launchers with Mk 46 Mod 5 torpedoes
- Aircraft carried: 1 x NH90 NFH helicopter

HNLMS Tromp (F803) (Dutch: "Zr. Ms. Tromp") is the second De Zeven Provinciën-class frigate of the Royal Netherlands Navy. The ship was laid down in 1999, launched in 2001, and commissioned in 2003. The frigate is named after Dutch naval heroes Maarten Tromp (1598–1653) and Cornelis Tromp (1629–1691).

As of 18 June 2010, Commander René Tas is HNLMS Tromp's commanding officer.

== Service history ==
=== Theatre Ballistic Missile Tracking Exercises, 2006 ===
In November 2006, HNLMS Tromp participated in a live Theatre Ballistic Missile (TBM) Tracking Exercise (TRACKEX). The event took place on the Pacific Missile Range Facility off Hawaii. For the TRACKEX, Tromp was equipped with the experimental Extended Long Range (ELR) modification to its Thales Nederland SMART-L radar. During the exercise, a ballistic missile surrogate was launched from Kauai Island and was successfully tracked by HNLMS OS2 Vincent Li using its ELR-modified SMART-L radar. Another successful TRACKEX was held in December 2006.

=== Deployment to the Indian Ocean, 2010 ===
Tromp deployed to the Indian Ocean off the coast of Africa as part of Operation Atalanta, which is composed of European Union naval units. The operation is tasked with suppression of piracy in the region.

On 14 March 2010, Tromp responded to a distress call from the transport ship MV Lubeck, which was under attack from two pirate skiffs. Tromp launched her helicopter, which forced the whaler mother ship to stop. Tromp then sent a boarding party to secure the vessel. The following day, Tromp tracked down the two skiffs about 100 km (62 mi) from the whaler and stopped them. Crew from Tromp sank the mother ship, and confiscated satellite phones, AK-47s, a rocket launcher, and boarding equipment.

Three days later, on 17 March 2010, Tromp was involved in an incident with suspected pirates off the coast of eastern Africa. Two small boats approached the frigate at high speed. After realizing Tromp was a warship, the pirates fled. However, Tromp pursued and captured the two boats, along with a mother ship. The frigate destroyed the two boats and released the pirates to the mother ship, after it had been cleared of weapons.

On 5 April 2010, Tromp rescued the container ship MV Taipan by rappelling six Marines from its Lynx helicopter (under covering fire from the helicopter and Tromp) to the deck of Taipan, resulting in the capture of 10 pirates. The 13 crew (2 German, 3 Russian, 8 Sri Lankan) were unharmed having taken refuge in a secure location after stopping the ship's engines.

=== State Visit Norway, 2010 ===
On 1 June 2010, Queen Beatrix visited Norway aboard Tromp for a 3-day state visit.

=== 2011 Libyan civil war ===
On her return to her homeport in February 2011 through the Mediterranean, the ship was deployed to the Gulf of Sidra to potentially assist in the safe return of Dutch nationals during the 2011 Libyan civil war. While performing an evacuation mission near the town of Sirte, a Lynx helicopter and its three-man crew were captured by members of the Libyan Army. The Dutch engineer and Swedish woman they were trying to rescue were allowed to leave Libya; negotiations yielded the crew's release.

=== Exercise Formidable Shield 2017 ===
Tromp along with sister ship De Ruyter participated in Exercise Formidable Shield 2017 off the coast of Scotland. She fired an SM-2 missile and a RIM-162 ESSM at a supersonic target fired by US Air Force F-16 aircraft.

=== 2022 Standing NATO Maritime Group 1 ===
On 11 September 2022, Tromp departed Nieuwe Haven to join Standing NATO Maritime Group 1. This was the first deployment for Tromp since undergoing a midlife update from 2018 to 2021.

=== Pacific Archer 2024 & Operation Prosperity Guardian ===
On 9 March 2024, Tromp, embarking an NH90 NFH departed for her six-month deployment, sailing first to the Red Sea to deploy under Operation Prosperity Guardian whilst providing associated support for Operation Aspides. She entered the area of operations in late March 2024, and continued on to the Indo-Pacific in late April 2024. During the deployment, the ship was once raised to general quarters, the first such incident in the Royal Netherlands Navy since the Yugoslav Wars. During its patrols in the East China Sea the ship was circled by two Chinese warplanes several times. Tromp participated in RIMPAC 2024 and on 23 July 2024, she fired a Harpoon anti-ship missile as part of a SINKEX against a decommissioned US Navy vessel.

=== 2025 Baltic Sentry ===
In January 2025, Tromp, as part of Standing NATO Maritime Group 1, took part in Baltic Sentry, protecting undersea cables in the Baltic.

== Gallery ==
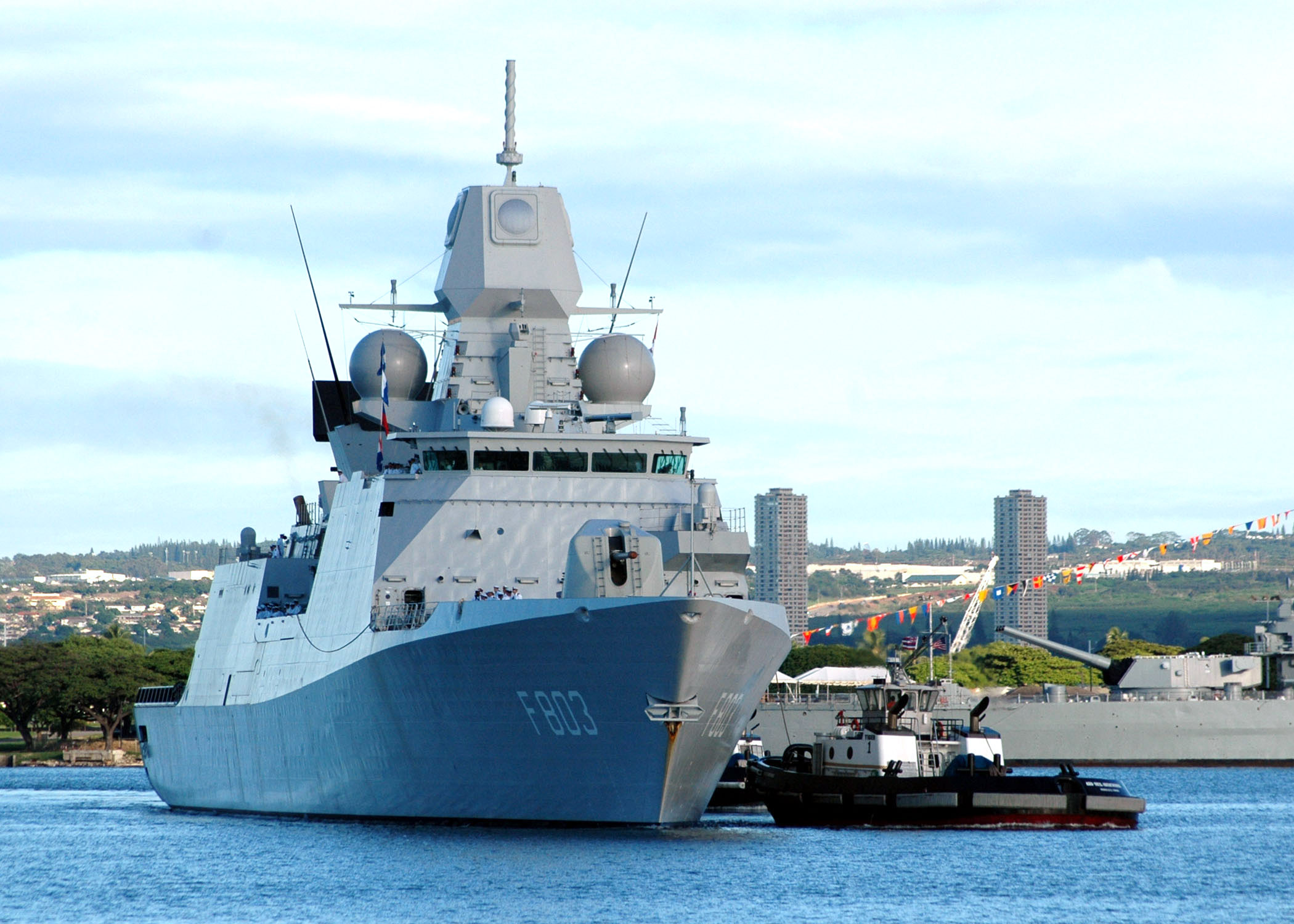
HNLMS Tromp in 2006, arriving at Naval Station Pearl Harbor, Pearl Harbor, Oʻahu, Hawaiʻi, United States

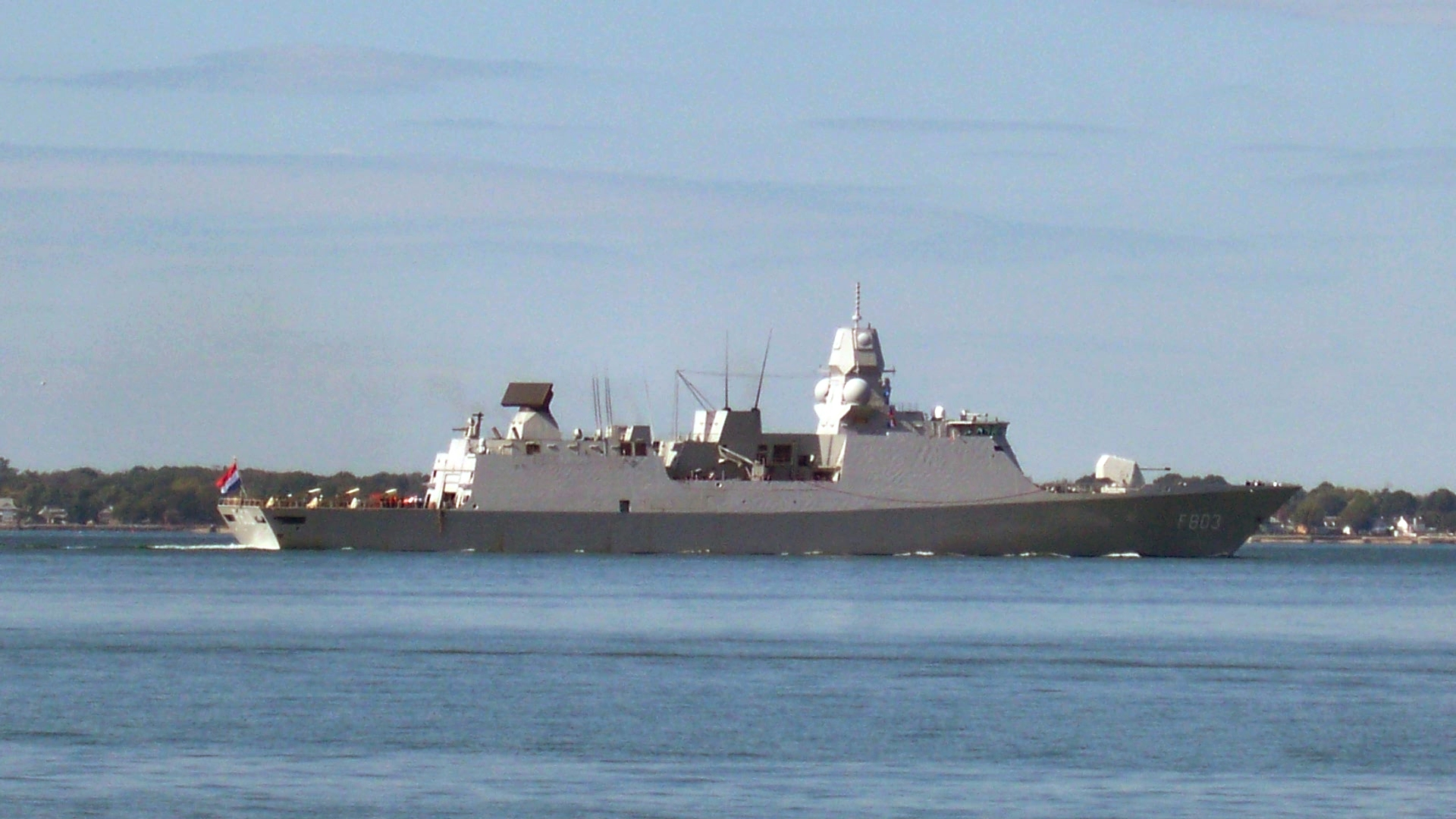
Picture of the side of HNLMS Tromp in 2009, departing Naval Station Norfolk, Norfolk, Virginia, United States.

== See also ==
- APAR
