= Selex RAN-40L =

Naval radar

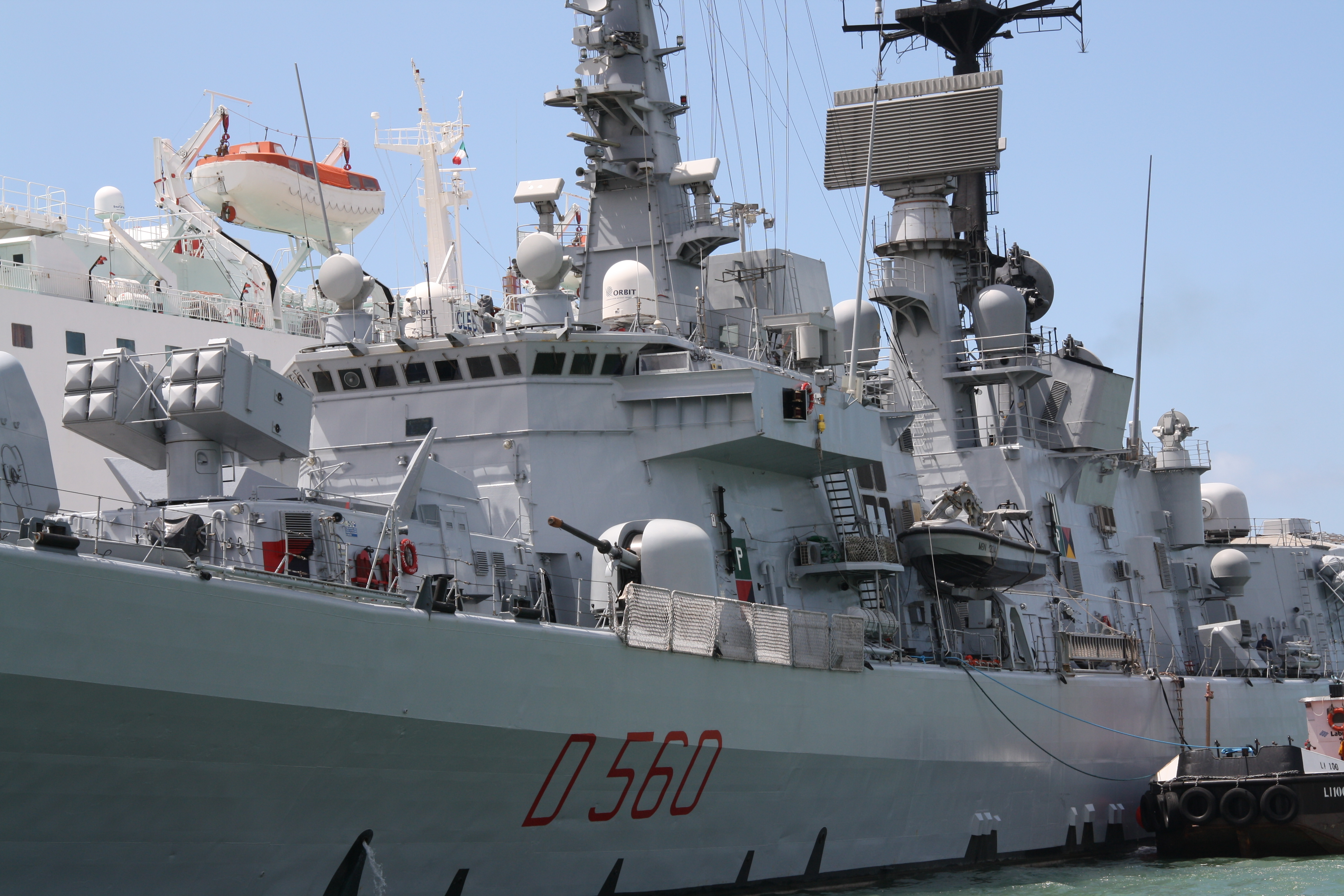
- Country of origin: Italy
- Type: 3D Solid-state Long Range Early Warning Naval Active Phased Array Radar
- Frequency: L band
- RPM: 6 rpm modes
- Range: 400 km
- Azimuth: 0–360°

Selex RAN-40L is a naval 3D L band search radar developed by Leonardo. The radar is used for long range maritime air surveillance and early warning. The radar uses a fully solid state active phased array antenna and capable of tracking and detecting air targets like aircraft or drones up to 400 km away. RAN-40L is based on existing land based 3D RAT-31DL radar which is a system widely used by NATO Countries for long air surveillance.

The radar functions include Track While Scan for air and surface long-range surveillance and missile tracking. Radar coverage is obtained by phase scanning in elevation, while mechanically rotating in azimuth. The antenna rotates at 6rpm or 12rpm, with 360° azimuth coverage.

== Operators ==
India
- INS Vikrant Aircraft Carrier

Italy

- Italian aircraft carrier Cavour
- Durand de la Penne-class destroyers

== See also ==
- Selex RAT-31DL
- SMART-L
- AN/SPY-3
- AN/SPY-6
- OPS-24
- OPS-50
- Type 346 Radar
- Phased array
- Active electronically scanned array
- Active phased array radar
