= Selex RAT-31DL =

Long-range air surveillance radar manufactured by Leonardo

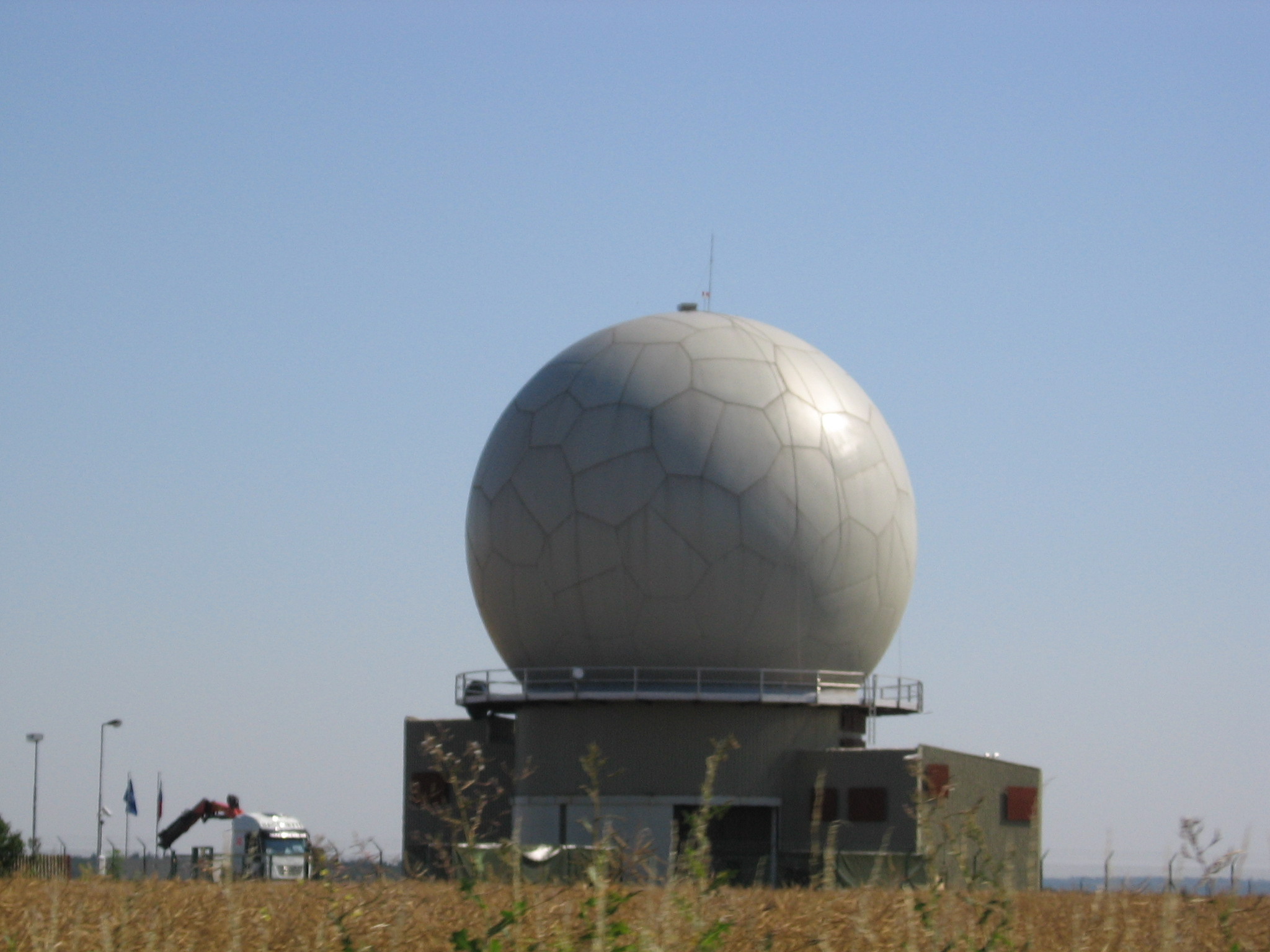
- RAT-31DL in the Czech Republic
- Country of origin: Italy
- Type: 3D Solid-state Long Range Surveillance Active Phased Array Radar
- Frequency: L band
- RPM: 6 rpm
- Range: 470 km detection range and 500 km instrumented range
- Altitude: 30 km
- Azimuth: 0–360°
- Elevation: 0°-20°

The Selex RAT-31DL is a long-range air surveillance radar manufactured by Leonardo (previously Selex ES, SELEX Sistemi Integrati and later Finmeccanica). The acronym RAT stands for Radar Avvistamento Terrestre, an Italian term for such "ground-based reconnaissance radar".

The RAT-31DL is an L-band solid-state active phased array 3D radar with an effective range of over 500 km. It is derivative of widely used RAT-31 SL.

The RAT 31DL is a solid-state active phased array radar with monopulse antenna with 42 rows of 42 Tx/Rx modules of which 24 boosted, each with 2 kW output power. The 360 ° search is performed with four independent beams in the L band at 6 rpm, the vertical pivoting of the beams is done by means of electronic phase shift of the 42 rows feeding the antenna.

== RAT-31DL/M ==
The mobile RAT 31 DL / M radar variant is derived from the stationary FADR version. The RAT 31 DL / M consists of a fold-able antenna and an equipment shelter, which are housed in air transportable 20-foot ISO containers. This configuration allows rapid deployment with high mobility and allows deployment in an unprepared position.

== See also ==
- Selex RAN-40L Naval Long Range Surveillance radar.

== Operators ==
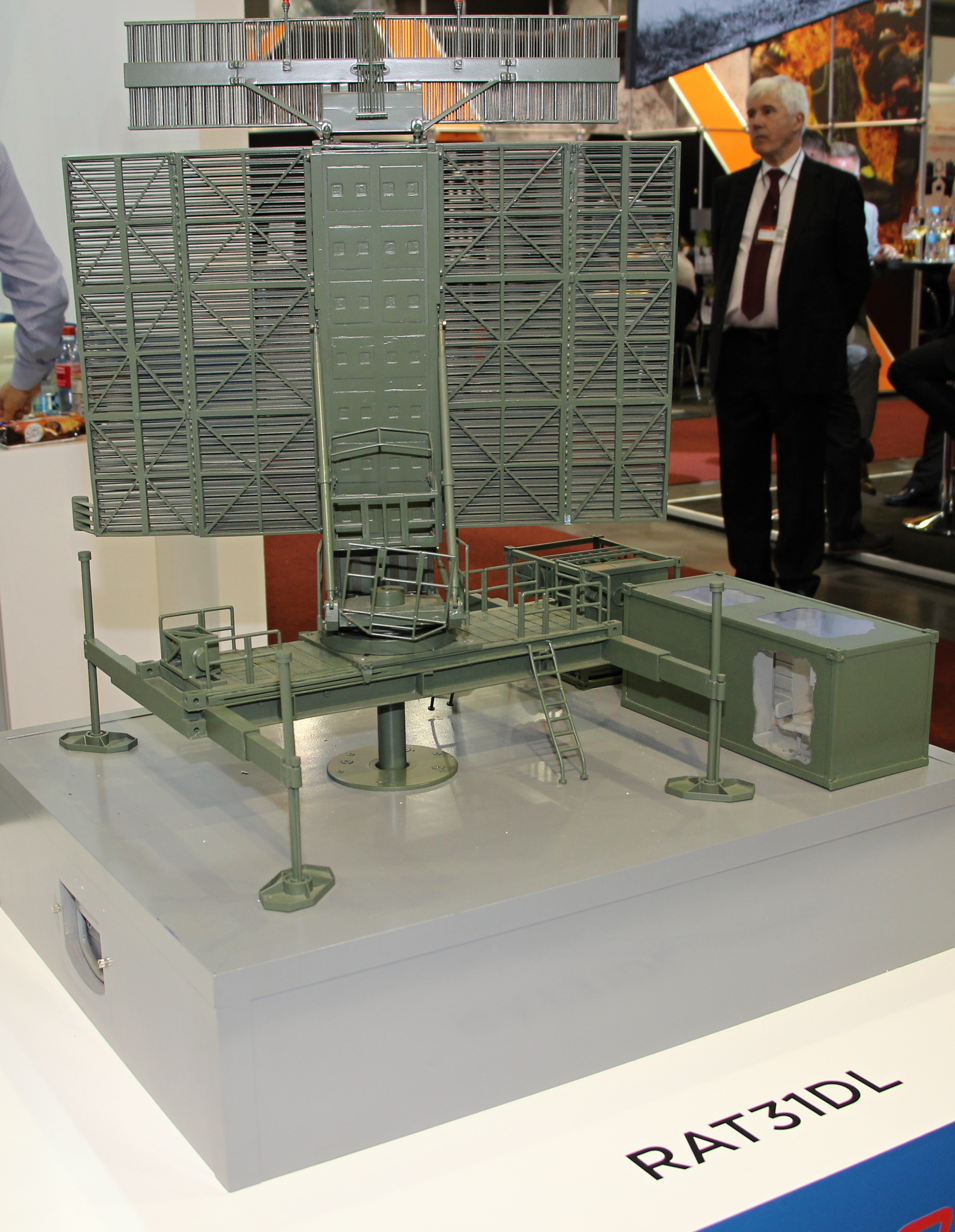
Model of RAT-31DL/M

Austria

- Austrian Air Force: 3 RAT-31 DL, 1 RAT-31 DL/M

Bangladesh

- Bangladesh Air Force: 1 system.

Italy

- Italian Air Force

Germany

- German Air Force

Malaysia

- Royal Malaysian Air Force

Poland

- Polish Air Force

Denmark

- Royal Danish Air Force

Czech Republic

- Czech Air Force

Greece

- Hellenic Air Force

Hungary

- Hungarian Air Force

Spain

- Spanish Air and Space Force

Thailand

- Royal Thai Air Force

Egypt

- Egypt Air Force

Turkey

- Turkish Air Force

United Kingdom

- Royal Air Force

Indonesia

- Indonesian Air Force
