= SMART-L =

Long-range, rotating AESA radar

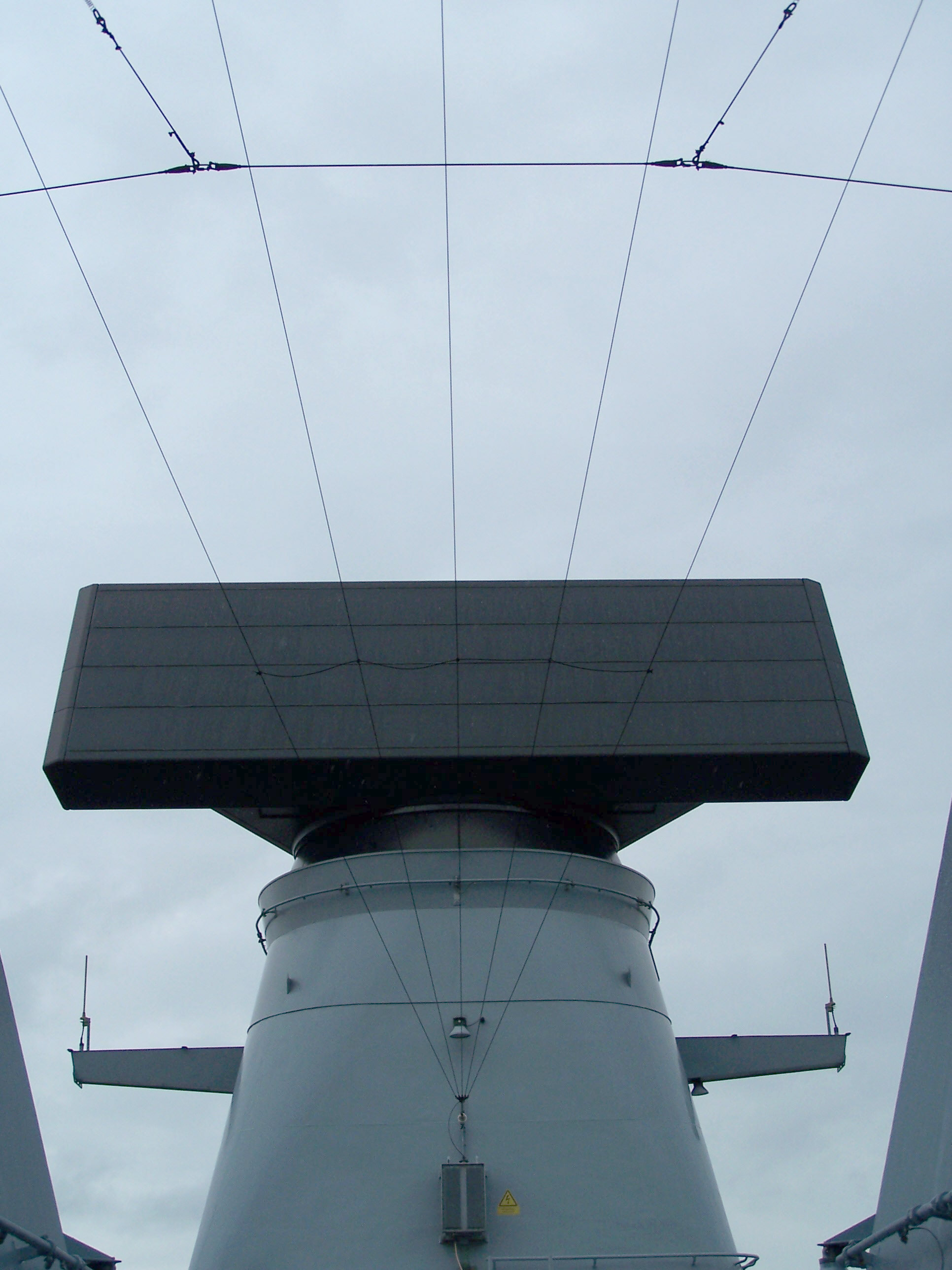
- SMART-L onboard F221 Hessen a Sachsen class frigate
- Country of origin: Netherlands
- Manufacturer: Thales Nederland

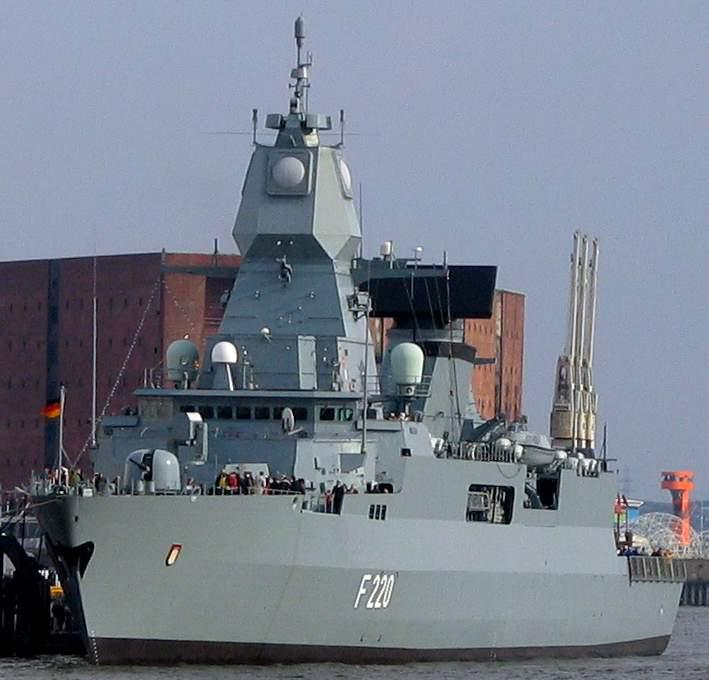
F220 Hamburg of the German Navy with SMART-L radar

SMART-L (Signaal Multibeam Acquisition Radar for Tracking, L band) is a long-range naval search radar introduced in 2002 by Thales Nederland, formerly Hollandse Signaalapparaten (Signaal).

== Design ==
The digital antenna array has 24 elements; all are used for reception, while 16 are used for creating virtual receiver beams through digital beamforming. The beams' vertical elevation, and compensation for ship movement, is done electronically. Horizontal training is done by mechanically rotating the entire array.

As designed, SMART-L has a maximum range of 400 km (220 nmi) against patrol aircraft, and 65 km (35 nmi) against stealthy missiles. A software upgrade, Extended Long Range (ELR) Mode, extends the maximum range for the detection of ballistic missiles to over 2000 km, since 2018 all four Zeven Provincien class Frigates of the Royal Netherlands Navy have been equipped with the update.

On the 25th of September 2017, as part of the exercise Formidable Shield 2017 the SMART-L MM radar system mounted on the test tower at the Thales premises in Hengelo, detected and tracked a ballistic missile launched from the Hebrides in Scotland at an average range of more than 1500 km without difficulties. The Thales SMART-L Multi Mission radar in Hengelo detected the target as soon as it appeared over the horizon and maintained a stable track for more than 300 seconds. The track quality was sufficient to enable Launch On Remote by BMD-capable naval ships.

== Variants ==
- SMART-L
- SMART-L MM/N (Multi-mission, Naval)
- SMART-L MM/F (Multi-mission, Fixed)
- S1850M

== Specifications ==
- Antenna system:
  - Dimensions; 8.4 × 4 × 4.4 m (28 × 13 × 14 ft), 7,800 kg (17,200 lb)
  - Number of antenna elements: 24 (16 transceivers, 8 receivers)
  - Number of beams formed: 16
  - Beamwidth 2.2° horizontal, 0–70° vertical
  - Polarization: vertical
  - Frequency: L band
  - Rotational speed: 12 rpm
  - IFF system integrated, D band
- Maximum detection ranges:
  - Stealth missiles: 65 km (35 nmi)
  - Patrol aircraft: 400 km (220 nmi)
  - Ballistic missiles:2000 km after software upgrade.
- Maximal numbers of tracked targets:
  - Airborne: 1000
  - Seaborne: 100

== Users ==
Ship class / Air force use	Operator	Variant	Quantity	Notes
Land applications
Air Operations Control Station Nieuw-Milligen	Royal Netherlands Air and Space Force	SMART-L MM/F	1	
Radar station Herwijnen	Royal Netherlands Air and Space Force	SMART-L MM/F	1	To be installed
Swedish Air Defence & Control - SLRR programme (särskilt långräckviddig radar)	Swedish Air Force	SMART-L MM/F	Unknown	
Land applications - sub-total			2	
Naval applications
De Zeven Provinciën-class frigate	Royal Netherlands Navy	SMART-L MM/N	4	
Dokdo-class amphibious assault ship	Republic of Korea Navy	SMART-L	1	The second ship of the class uses the EL/M-2248 MF-STAR.
Horizon-class frigate	French Navy	S1850M	2	
Horizon-class frigate	Italian Navy	S1850M	2	
Horizon-class frigate - modernised	French Navy	SMART-L MM/N	2	
Horizon-class frigate - modernised	Italian Navy	SMART-L MM/N	2	
Iver Huitfeldt-class frigate	Royal Danish Navy	SMART-L	3	
Queen Elizabeth-class aircraft carrier	Royal Navy	S1850M	2	
Sachsen-class frigate	Deutsche Marine	SMART-L	3	Being replaced by the Hensoldt TRS-4D/LR ROT.
Type 45 destroyer	Royal Navy	S1850M	6	
Naval applications - sub-total			27	
Total			29	

== See also ==
- Thales/BAE Systems Insyte S1850M, a SMART-L derivative.
- Selex RAN-40L
