= Active Phased Array Radar =

Shipborne multi-function radar

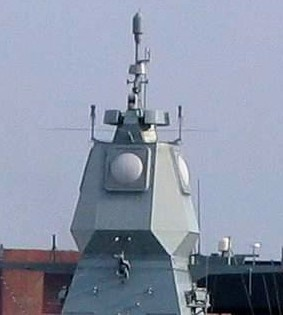
APAR mounted on top of the German Navy Sachsen class frigate Hamburg's superstructure

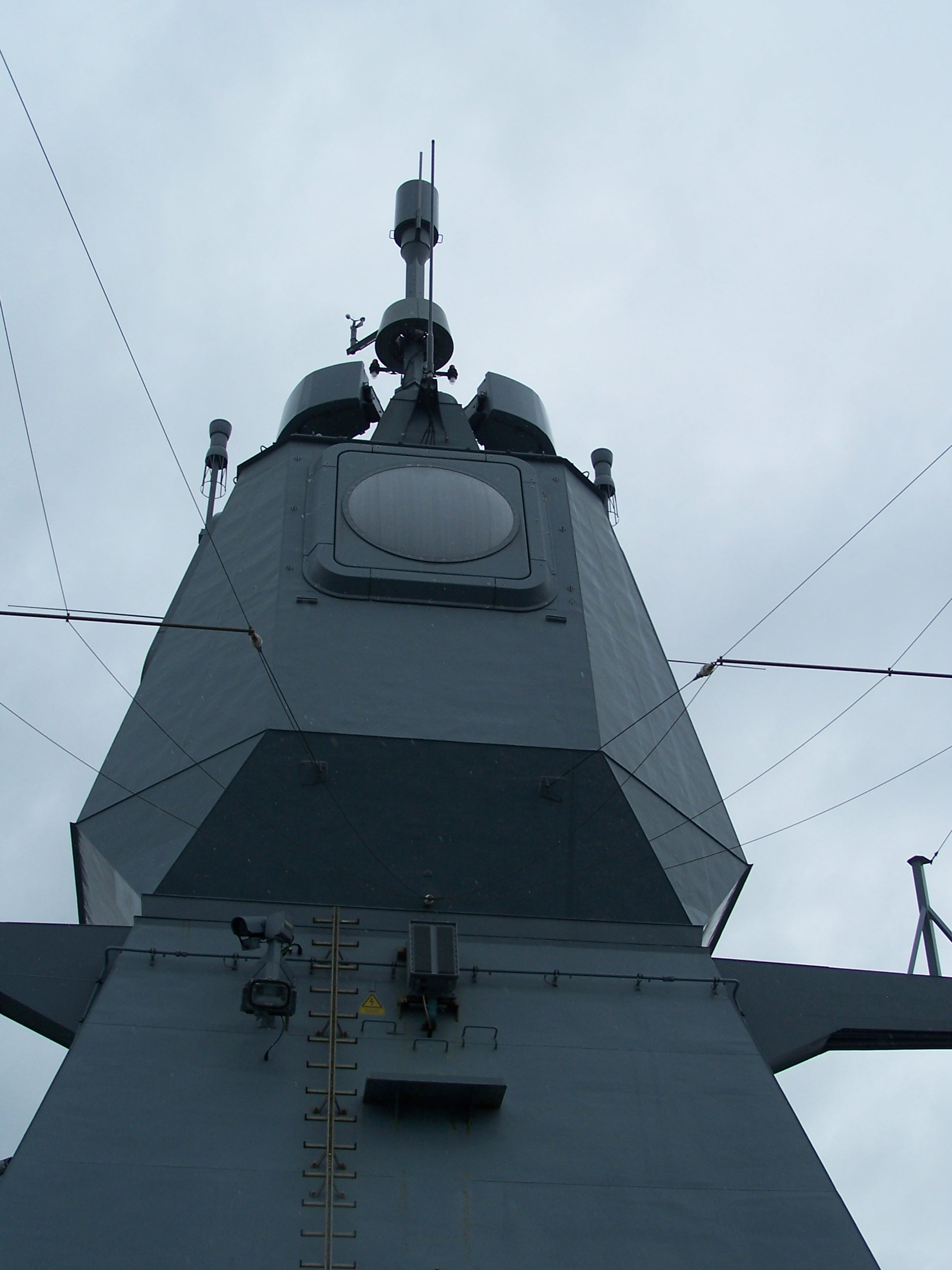
Rear side of APAR on board the German Navy Sachsen class frigate Hessen

Active Phased Array Radar (APAR) is a shipborne active electronically scanned array multifunction 3D radar (MFR) developed and manufactured by Thales Nederland. The radar receiver modules are developed and built in the US by the Sanmina Corporation.

== Characteristics ==
APAR has four fixed (i.e., non-rotating) sensor arrays (faces), fixed on a pyramidal structure. Each face consists of 3424 transmit/receive (TR) modules operating at X band frequencies.

The radar provides the following capabilities:

- air target tracking of over 200 targets out to 150 km
- surface target tracking of over 150 targets out to 32 km
- horizon search out to 75 km
- "limited" volume search out to 150 km (in order to back up the volume search capabilities of the SMART-L)
- cued search (a mode in which the search is cued using data originating from another sensor)
- surface naval gunfire support
- missile guidance using the Interrupted Continuous Wave Illumination (ICWI) technique, thus allowing guidance of 32 semi-active radar homing missiles in flight simultaneously, including 16 in the terminal guidance phase
- "innovative" Electronic Counter-Countermeasures (ECCM)

Note: all ranges listed above are instrumented ranges.

== Usage ==
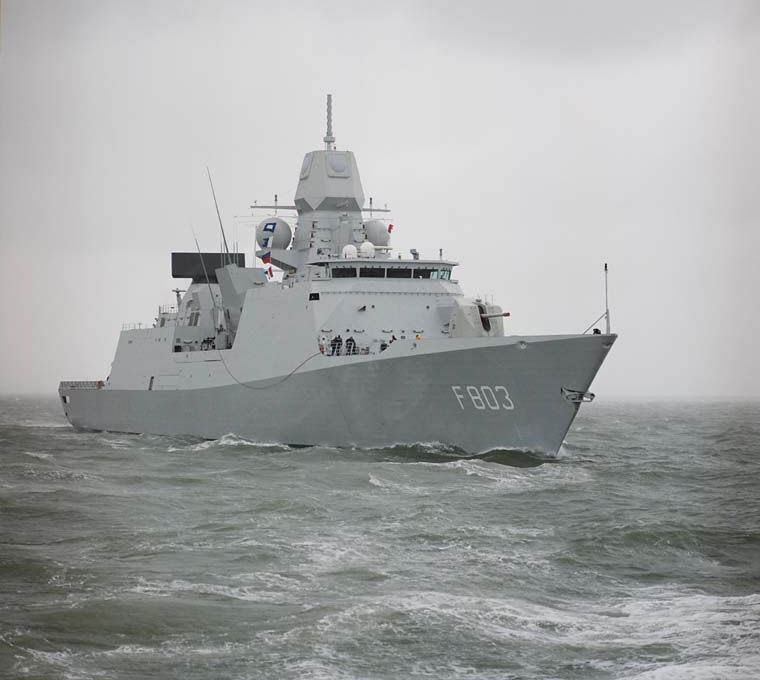
APAR aboard the Royal Netherlands Navy De Zeven Provinciën class frigate HNLMS Tromp

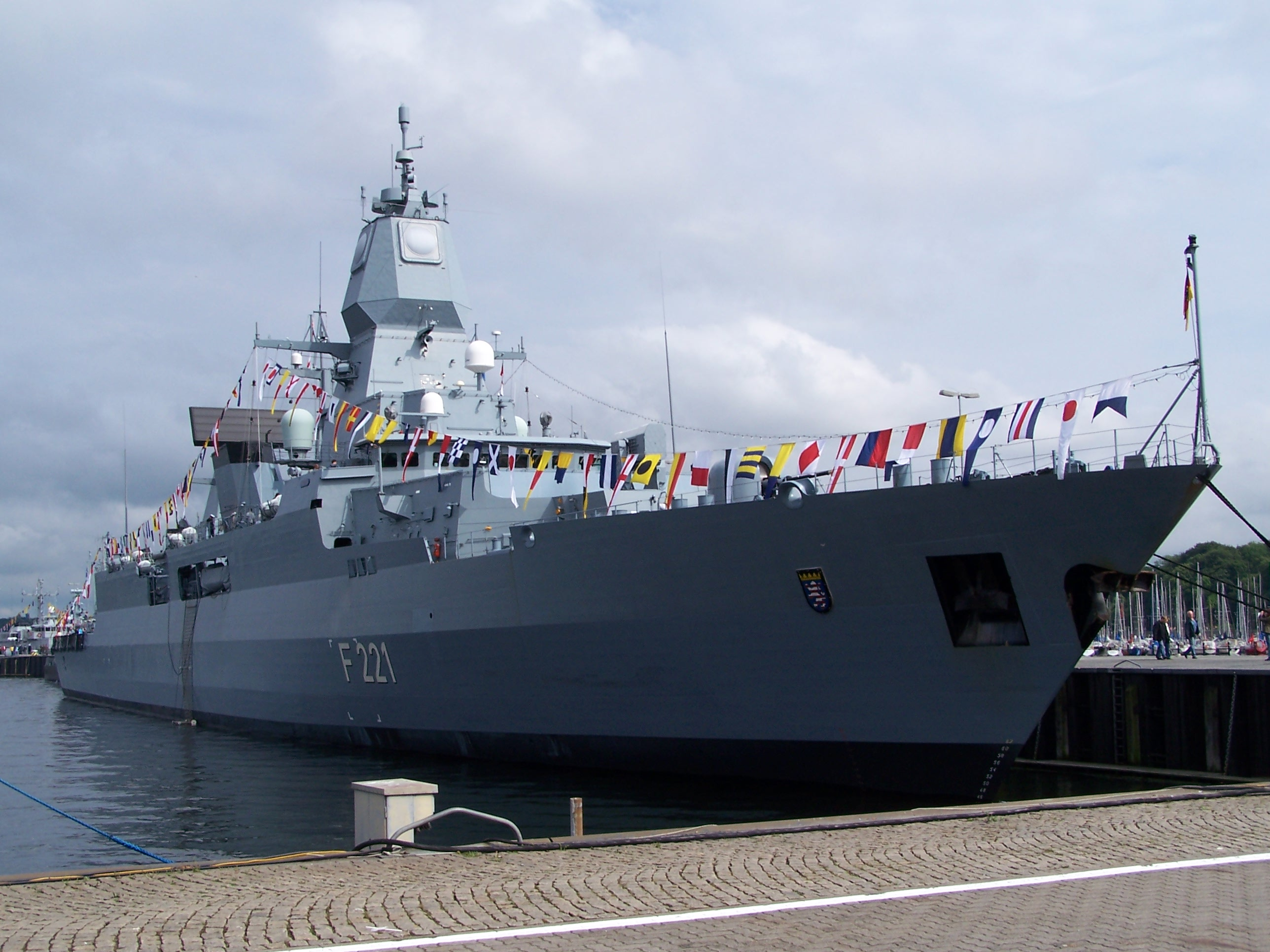
APAR aboard the German Navy Sachsen class frigate Hessen at Kiel Week 2007

APAR is installed on four Royal Netherlands Navy (RNLN) LCF De Zeven Provinciën class frigates, three German Navy F124 Sachsen class frigates, and three Royal Danish Navy Iver Huitfeldt class frigates. The Netherlands and Germany (along with Canada) were the original sponsors for the development of APAR.

Denmark selected APAR for their frigates as part of a larger decision to select a Thales Nederland anti-air warfare system (designed around the APAR and SMART-L radars, the Raytheon ESSM and SM-2 missile systems, and the Lockheed Martin Mk-41 vertical launch system) over the competing Sea Viper anti-air warfare system (designed around the S1850M and BAE Systems SAMPSON radars, the MBDA Aster 15/30 missile systems, and the MBDA SYLVER vertical launch system).

== Live missile firings ==
APAR's missile guidance capability supports the Evolved Sea Sparrow Missile (ESSM) and the SM-2 Block IIIA missile. In November 2003, approximately 200 nautical miles (370 km) from the Azores, the missile guidance capabilities were tested with live firings for the first time. The firings were performed by the RNLN's HNLMS De Zeven Provinciën and involved the firing of a single ESSM and a single SM-2 Block IIIA. These firings were the first ever live firings involving a full-size ship-borne Active Electronically Scanned Array guiding missiles using the ICWI technique in an operational environment. As related by Jane's Navy International:

During the tracking and missile-firing tests, target profiles were provided by Greek-built EADS/3Sigma Iris PVK medium-range subsonic target drones. [...] According to the RNLN, ... "APAR immediately acquired the missile and maintained track until destruction". [...] These ground-breaking tests represented the world's first live verification of the ICWI technique.

In August 2004, a German Navy Sachsen class frigate completed a series of live missile firings at the Point Mugu missile launch range off the coast of California that included a total of 11 ESSM and 10 SM-2 Block IIIA missiles. The tests included firings against target drones such as the Northrop Grumman BQM-74E Chukkar III and Teledyne Ryan BQM-34S Firebee I, as well as against missile targets such as the Beech AQM-37C and air-launched Kormoran 1 anti-ship missiles.

Further live firings were performed by the RNLN's HNLMS De Zeven Provinciën in March 2005, again in the Atlantic Ocean approximately 180 nautical miles (330 km) west of the Azores. The tests involved three live-firing events including firing a single SM-2 Block IIIA at an Iris target drone at long range, a single ESSM at an Iris target drone, and a two-salvo launch (with one salvo comprising two SM-2 Block IIIAs and the other comprising two ESSMs) against two incoming Iris target drones. The long-range SM-2 engagement apparently resulted in an intercept at a range of greater than 100 km from the ship, with a missile-target miss distance of 2,4m/8 feet (the warhead's proximity fuse having been disabled for the purposes of the test).

== Operational concept ==
APAR is typically paired with Thales Nederland's SMART-L passive electronically scanned array radar (which operates at L band frequencies). SMART-L is a long-range Volume Search Radar (VSR) that is able to provide volume search and tracking out to 480 km. The whole system is called Anti-Air Warfare Systems (AAWS), and is based on the NATO Anti-Air Warfare (NAAWS) concept of the late 1980s. The principle behind this concept is that an X band MFR coupled with an L band VSR provides the optimal combination of complementary capabilities: the VSR is optimized for long range detection and tracking of targets, while the MFR is optimized for medium range high accuracy tracking of targets, as well as horizon search and missile guidance functions.

== Counter-piracy operations ==
Ships of the RNLN's De Zeven Provinciën class have been involved in counter-piracy operations off the Horn of Africa. The untraditional target set (i.e., small slow-moving or even static surface targets) can apparently be challenging for doppler radars designed to take on "high end" threats. However, according to Jane's International Defence Review:

[The RNLN has] reported great success using tailored surface-search software for the APAR sets fitted to the De Zeven Provinciën-class frigates deployed on anti-piracy roles. By sacrificing some of APAR's high-end anti-air warfare capabilities, which were deemed unnecessary for the anti-piracy role, its performance and resolution were improved in the surface-search role.

The exploits of the RNLN's De Zeven Provinciën class frigate HNLMS Tromp in regards to counter-piracy operations — including the April 2010 rescue of the container ship MV Taipan — are described here. The counter-piracy exploits of the HNLMS Evertsen are outlined here.

== Operators ==
=== Current operators ===
Block 1

- (Netherlands) De Zeven Provinciën-class frigate
- (Germany) Sachsen-class frigate
- (Denmark) Iver Huitfeldt-class frigate

=== Future operators ===
Block 2

- (Germany) Niedersachsen-class frigate
- (Netherlands) ASW-class frigate

== See also ==
- Active electronically scanned array
- Phased array

== Sources ==
- Jane's International Defence Review, September 2010, "Fighting the hydra: multinational piracy operations move inshore"
- Jane's Navy International, August 2010, "Expanding coverage from sea to sky"
- Jane's Radar and Electronic Warfare Systems, 2007–2008 Edition, Edited by Martin Streetly, ISBN 978-0-7106-2811-4
- Jane's Navy International, October 2005, "Live firing tests rewrite the guiding principles"
- Jane's International Defence Review, February 2004, "Active phased array multifunction radars go live for missile firings"
