= Military ranks of Cape Verde =

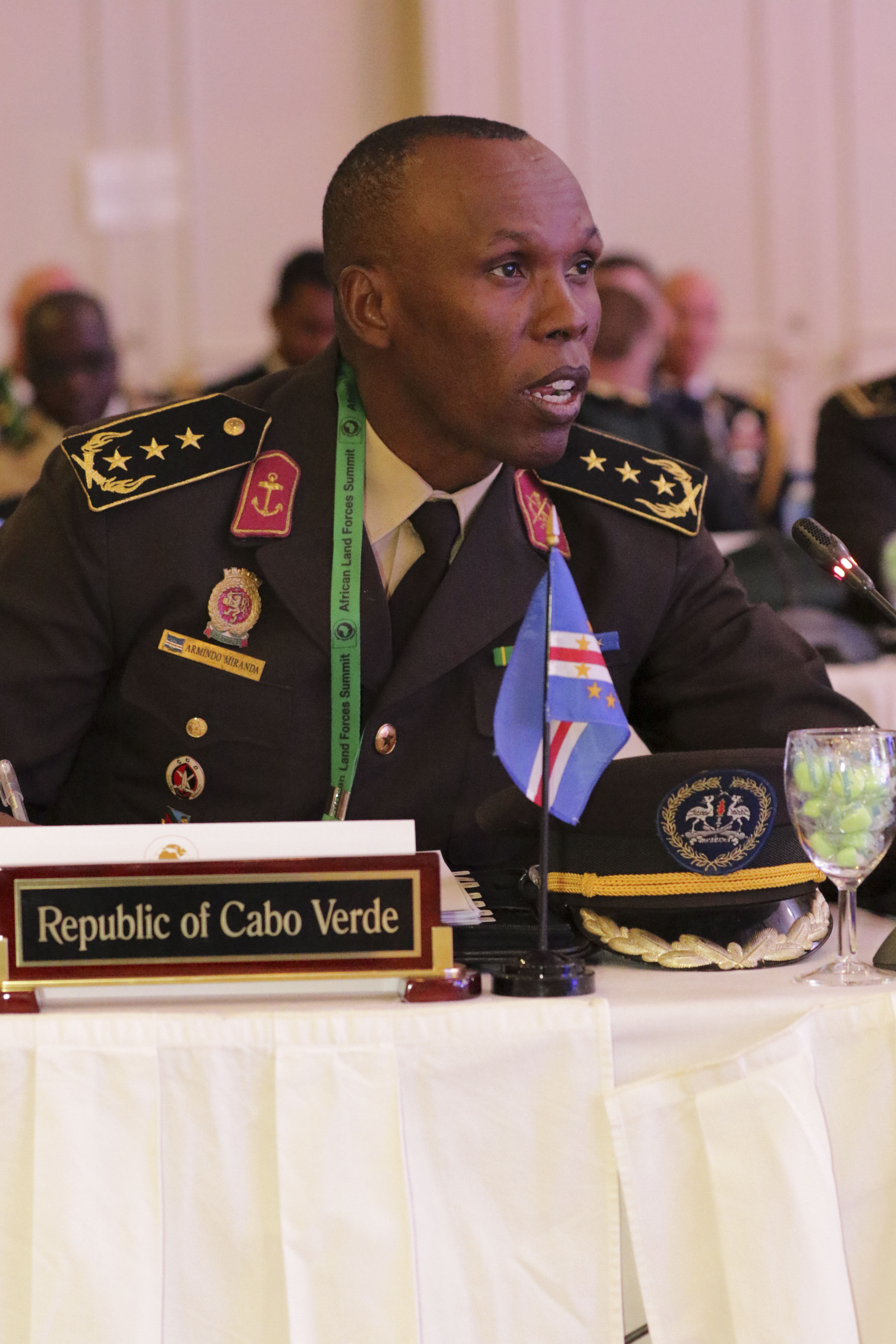
A colonel, pictured in 2019

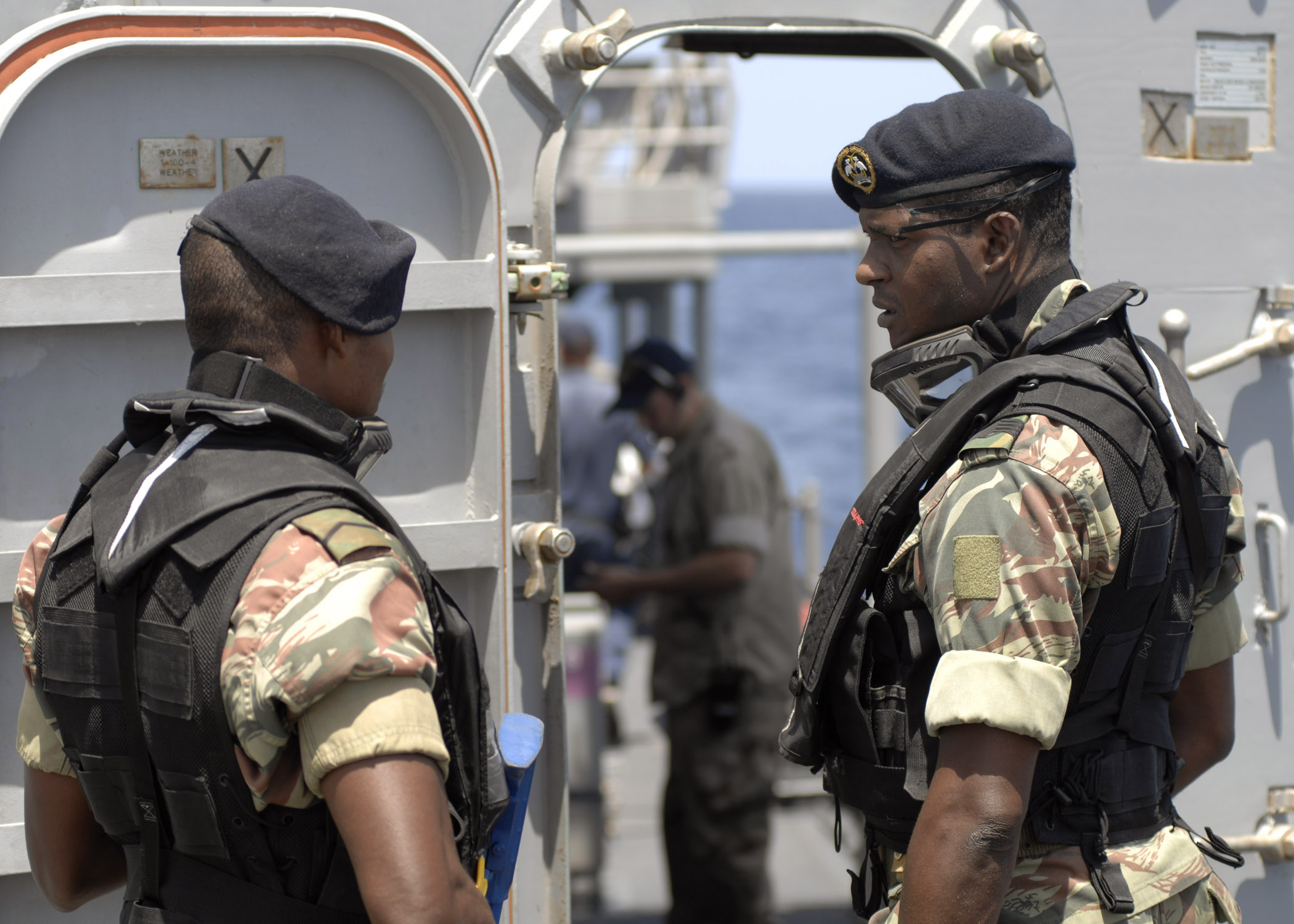
Enlisted men of the ranks of segundo-cabo (left) and Sargento-principal (right)

Military ranks of Cape Verde are the insignia used to denote rank in the Cape Verdean Armed Forces, including the National Guard and Coast Guard.

== Background ==
The Cape Verdean Armed Forces have existed since independence from Portugal in 1975. The currently comprise 1,200 personnel in the National Guard, plus 200 Coast Guard and 100 in the Air Force (which organisationally comes under the Coast Guard). The structure and organisation is defined by the Decree-Law no. 30/2007 of August 20. The National Guard and Coast Guard have their own headquarters which are responsible to the Chief of Staff of the Armed Forces, a colonel. The Chief of Staff also has responsibility for the armed forces' Staff Command and Logistics Command. The chief of staff is supported by a deputy, also a colonel. The Coast Guard use the same rank structure as the land forces and have been commanded by an officer with the rank of major (2013) or lieutenant-colonel (2011).

The organisation is headed by a General Chief of Staff who, in 2015, held the rank of Major-General. The armed forces as a whole come under the control of the civilian government.

== Commissioned officer ranks ==
The rank insignia of commissioned officers.

Rank group	General / flag officers		Senior officers			Junior officers
Cape Verdean National Guard
Cape Verdean National Guard	Major-general	Brigadeiro-general	Coronel	Tenente-coronel	Major	Capitão	Primeiro tenente	Tenente	Subtenente
Cape Verdean Coast Guard
Cape Verdean Coast Guard	Contra-almirante	Comodoro	Capitão–de–mar	Capitão–de–navio	Capitão-de–patrulha	Capitão-tenente	Primeiro-tenente	Tenente	Guarda-marinha

=== Student officer ranks ===
Rank group	Student officer
Cape Verdean National Guard
Cape Verdean National Guard	Aspirante
Cape Verdean Coast Guard
Cape Verdean Coast Guard	Aspirante à oficial

== Enlisted ==
This table illustrates the rank insignia of enlisted members of the national guard and coast guard.

Rank group	Senior NCOs								Junior NCOs			Enlisted
Cape Verdean National Guard															No insignia
Cape Verdean National Guard	Sargento-mor	Sargento-chefe	Sargento-principal	Primeiro-sargento	Segundo-sargento	Sargento	Furriel	Instruendo curso de sargento	Cabo-principal	Cabo de Secção	Cabo-adjunto	Primeiro-cabo	Segundo-cabo	Instruendo curso de cabo	Soldado
Cape Verdean Coast Guard
Cape Verdean Coast Guard	Sargento-mor	Sargento-chefe	Sargento-principal	Primeiro-sargento	Segundo-sargento	Furriel		Segundo-furriel	Cabo-principal	Cabo de secção	Cabo-adjunto	Primeiro-cabo	Segundo-cabo

== Former ranks ==
Officers

Rank group	General / flag officers	Senior officers			Junior officers
(Cape Verde) Cape Verdean National Guard (1992–2012)
(Cape Verde) Cape Verdean National Guard (1992–2012)		Colonel; Coronel	Lieutenant Colonel; Tenente-coronel	Major; Major	Captain; Capitão	First Lieutenant; Primeiro tenente	Lieutenant; Tenente	Second Lieutenant; Subtenente	Officer Cadet; Aspirante
Cape Verdean National Guard (1975–1992)
Cape Verdean National Guard (1975–1992)	Brigade Commandant; Comandante de brigada	First Commandant; Primeiro comandante	Commandant; Comandante	Major; Major	Captain; Capitão	First Lieutenant; Primeiro tenente	Lieutenant; Tenente	Second Lieutenant; Subtenente	Officer Cadet; Aspirante}

Enlisted

Rank group	Senior NCOs							Junior NCOs	Enlisted
(Cape Verde) Cape Verdean National Guard (1992–2012)											No insignia
(Cape Verde) Cape Verdean National Guard (1992–2012)	Sergeant-major; Sargento-mor	Chief sergeant Sargento-chefe	Master sergeant Sargento-principal	First sergeant Primeiro-sargento	Second sergeant Segundo-sargento	Sergeant; Sargento	Lance sergeant Furriel	Master corporal Cabo-adjunto	First corporal Primeiro-cabo	Second corporal Segundo-cabo	Soldado
Cape Verdean National Guard (1975–1992)											No insignia
Cape Verdean National Guard (1975–1992)				First sergeant Primeiro-sargento	Second sergeant Segundo-sargento	Lance sergeant Terceiro-sargento			First soldier Primeiro-soldado		Soldado
