= Cape Verdean Armed Forces =

Military of Cape Verde

- Forças Armadas de Cabo Verde
- Founded: 15 January 1967
- Service branches: Coast Guard; National Guard
- Headquarters: Praia, Santiago
- Website: fa.gov.cv

Leadership
- Commander-in-Chief: José Maria Neves
- Minister of National Defense: Janine Lélis
- Chief of Staff: Rear Admiral Manuel António Pereira Semedo

Personnel
- Military age: 18
- Conscription: 24 months
- Active personnel: 1,200

Expenditure
- Budget: $11.2 million (2018)
- Percent of GDP: 0.6% (2018)

Industry
- Foreign suppliers: China; Germany; Portugal; Russia; United States Historical: Soviet Union

Related articles
- Ranks: Military ranks of Cape Verde

The Cape Verdean Armed Forces (Portuguese: Forças Armadas de Cabo Verde, FACV) or Cabo Verdean Armed Forces are the military of Cape Verde. They include two branches, the National Guard and the Coast Guard.

== History ==
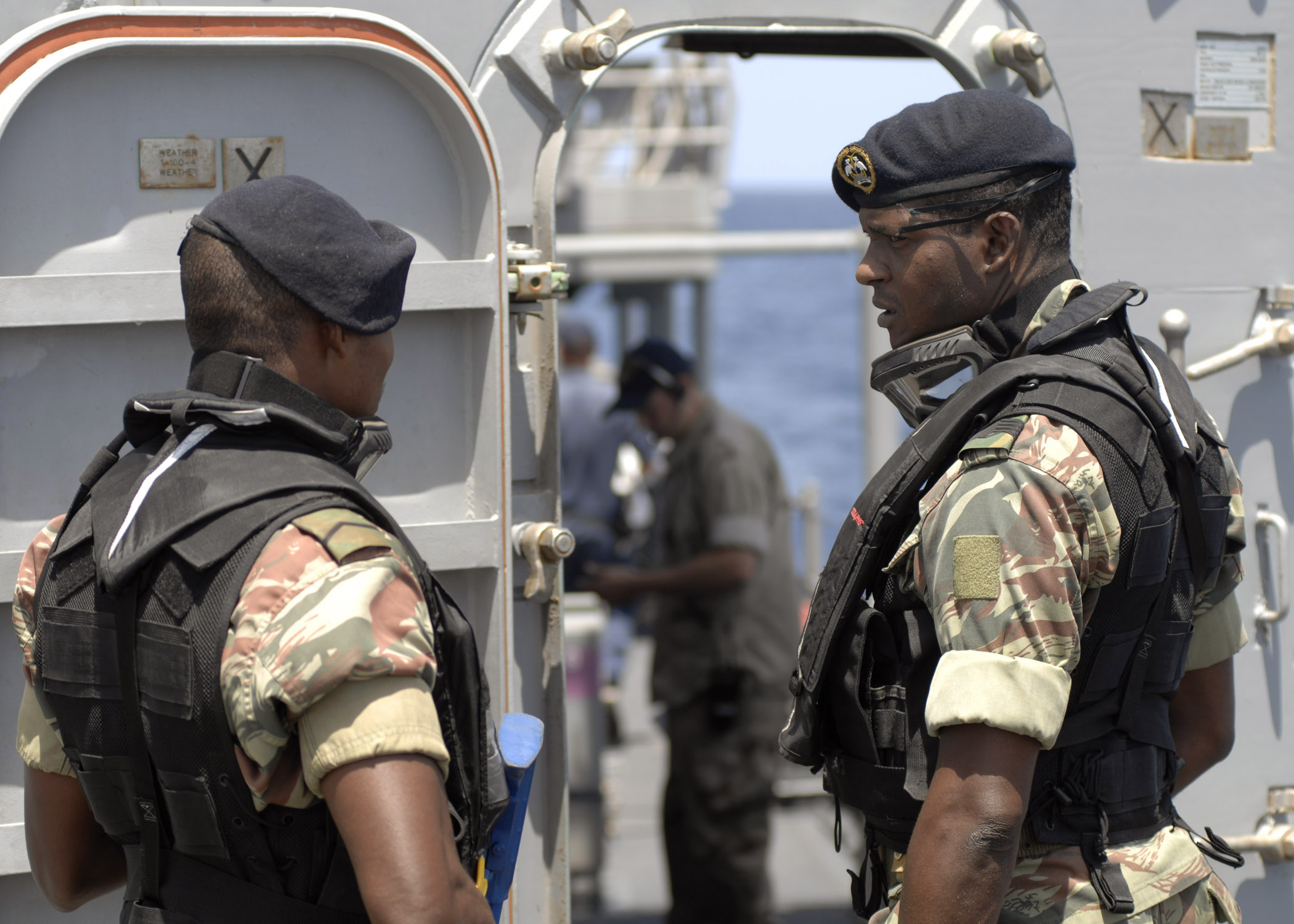
Cape Verdean Marines

Before 1975, Cape Verde was an overseas province of Portugal, having a small Portuguese military garrison that included both Cape Verdean and European Portuguese soldiers.

At the same time, some Cape Verdeans were serving in the People's Revolutionary Armed Forces (Forças Armadas Revolucionarias do Povo, FARP), the military wing of the African Party for the Independence of Guinea and Cape Verde that was fighting for the joint independence of Guinea and Cape Verde in the Guinea-Bissau War of Independence. The FARP became the national armed forces of Guinea-Bissau when its independence was recognized by Portugal in 1974.

The Armed Forces of Cape Verde were created when the country became independent in 1975, being also officially designated the People's Revolutionary Armed Forces (Forças Armadas Revolucionarias do Povo, FARP). The Cape Verdean FARP consisted of two independent branches, the Army (Exército) and the Coast Guard (Guarda Costeira).

In the early 1990s, the designation "FARP" was dropped and the military of Cape Verde was designated the Cape Verdean Armed Forces (Forças Armadas Cabo Verdeanas, FACV).

In 2007, the FACV started a major reorganization that included the transformation of the Army into the National Guard (Guarda Nacional).

Together with the Cape Verdean Police, the FACV carried out Operation Flying Launch (Operacão Lancha Voadora), a successful operation to put an end to a drug trafficking group which smuggled cocaine from Colombia to the Netherlands and Germany using Cape Verde as a reorder point. The operation took more than three years, being a secret operation during the first two years, and ended in 2010.

Although located in Africa, Cape Verde has always had close relations with Europe. Because of this, it has been argued that Cape Verde may be eligible for entry into the Organization for Security and Co-operation in Europe and NATO.

The most recent engagement of the FACV was the Monte Tchota massacre that resulted in 11 deaths.

== Structure ==
The Cape Verdean Armed Forces are part of the Ministry of National Defense of Cape Verde and include:

- the military bodies of command:
  - Chief of Staff of the Armed Forces
  - Office of the CEMFA
  - Staff of the Armed Forces (EMFA)
  - Personnel Command
  - Logistics Command
- the National Guard
- the Coast Guard

Flag of the Cape Verdean National Guard

=== National Guard ===
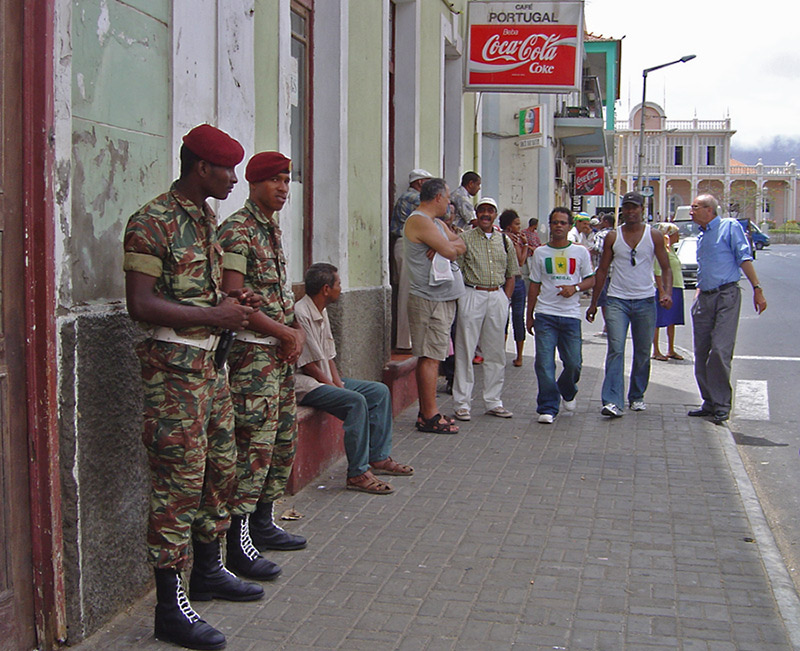
Military Police in Mindelo

The National Guard (Guarda National ) is the main branch of the Cape Verdean Armed Forces for the military defense of the country, being responsible for the execution of land and maritime environment operations and the support to internal security. It includes:

Cape Verde coast guard 2nd Sgt. Vladimir Goncalves loads a weapon with ammunition

- Territorial commands:
  - 1st Military Region Command
  - 2nd Military Region Command
  - 3rd Military Region Command
- Corps:
  - Military Police Corps
  - Marine Corps
  - Artillery Corps
  - Special Operations Unit
  - Support units

A Cape Verde coast guard sailor receives visit, board, search and seizure training

There is no general command of the National Guard. Each military region command is headed by a lieutenant-colonel directly subordinate to the Chief of Staff of the Armed Forces, and includes units of the three corps.

=== Coast Guard ===
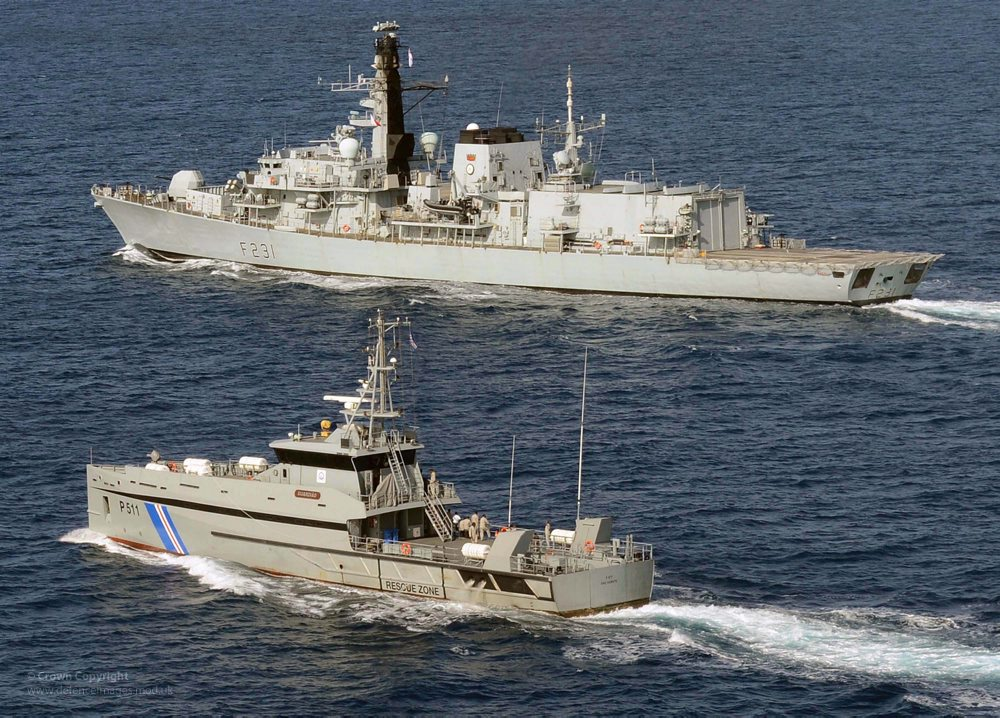
Coast Guard patrol vessel Guardião (P511), in manoeuvres with a British frigate

Flag of the Cape Verdean Coast Guard

The Coast Guard (Guarda Costeira) is the branch of the Cape Verdean Armed Forces responsible for the defense and protection of the country's economic interests at the sea under national jurisdiction and for providing air and naval support to land and amphibious operations. It includes:

- Coast Guard Command
- Maritime Security Operations Center (COSMAR)
- Naval Squadron
- Air Squadron

The Coast Guard is headed by an officer with the rank of lieutenant colonel. The Naval and Air Squadrons incorporate, respectively, all the vessels and aircraft of the Cape Verdean Armed Forces.

== Ranks ==
The rank insignia for commissioned officers for the national guard and coast guard.

Rank group	General / flag officers		Senior officers			Junior officers
Cape Verdean National Guard
Cape Verdean National Guard	Major-general	Brigadeiro-general	Coronel	Tenente-coronel	Major	Capitão	Primeiro tenente	Tenente	Subtenente
Cape Verdean Coast Guard
Cape Verdean Coast Guard	Contra-almirante	Comodoro	Capitão–de–mar	Capitão–de–navio	Capitão-de–patrulha	Capitão-tenente	Primeiro-tenente	Tenente	Guarda-marinha

The rank insignia of enlisted for the national guard and coast guard.

Rank group	Senior NCOs								Junior NCOs			Enlisted
Cape Verdean National Guard															No insignia
Cape Verdean National Guard	Sargento-mor	Sargento-chefe	Sargento-principal	Primeiro-sargento	Segundo-sargento	Sargento	Furriel	Instruendo curso de sargento	Cabo-principal	Cabo de Secção	Cabo-adjunto	Primeiro-cabo	Segundo-cabo	Instruendo curso de cabo	Soldado
Cape Verdean Coast Guard
Cape Verdean Coast Guard	Sargento-mor	Sargento-chefe	Sargento-principal	Primeiro-sargento	Segundo-sargento	Furriel		Segundo-furriel	Cabo-principal	Cabo de secção	Cabo-adjunto	Primeiro-cabo	Segundo-cabo

== Equipment ==
=== Small Arms ===
Image	Name	Origin	Notes/Cites
	Makarov pistol	Soviet Union	
	SKS	Soviet Union	
	AKM	Soviet Union	AKM & AKMS
	SVD (rifle)	Soviet Union	
	PK machine gun	Soviet Union	

=== Armoured vehicles ===
- 10 BRDM-2

=== Artillery ===
- 12 82-PM-41
- 6 120-PM-43 mortar

=== Anti-aircraft ===
- 9K32 Strela-2
- 18 ZPU-1
- 12 ZU-23-2

=== Aircraft ===
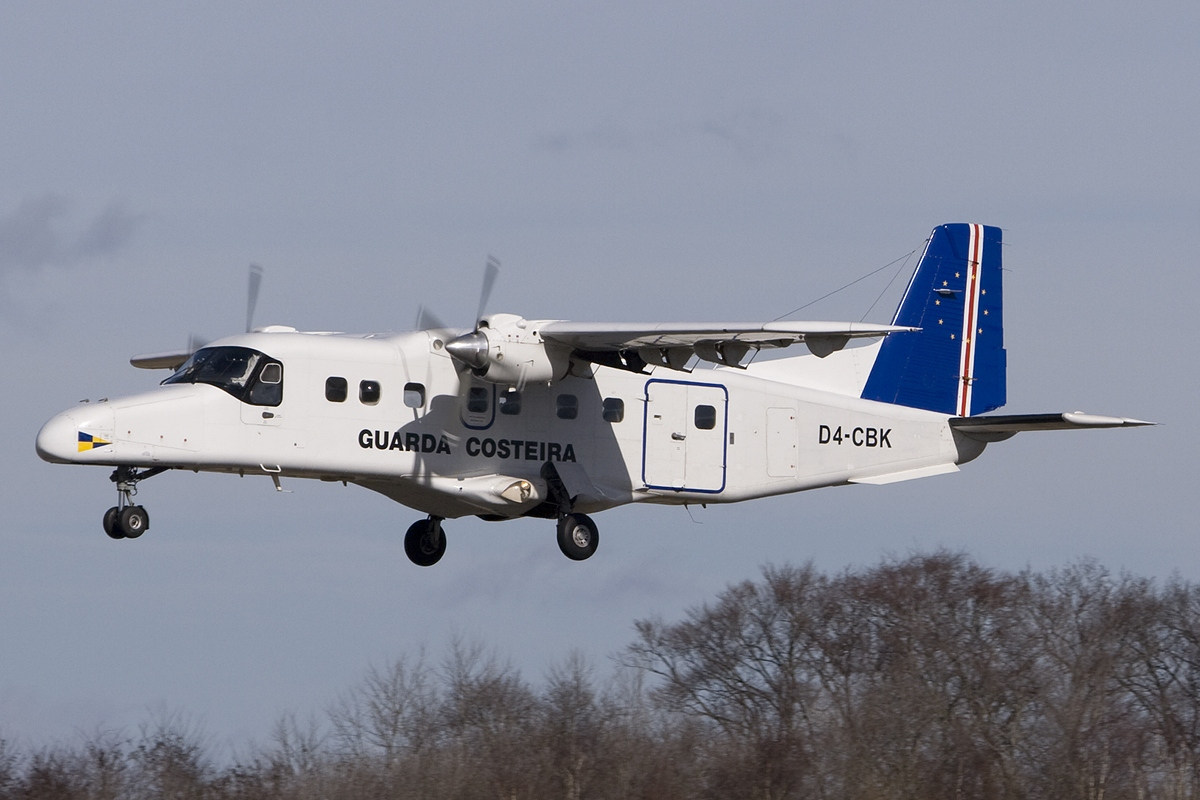
Dornier 228 of the Cape Verdean Coast Guard

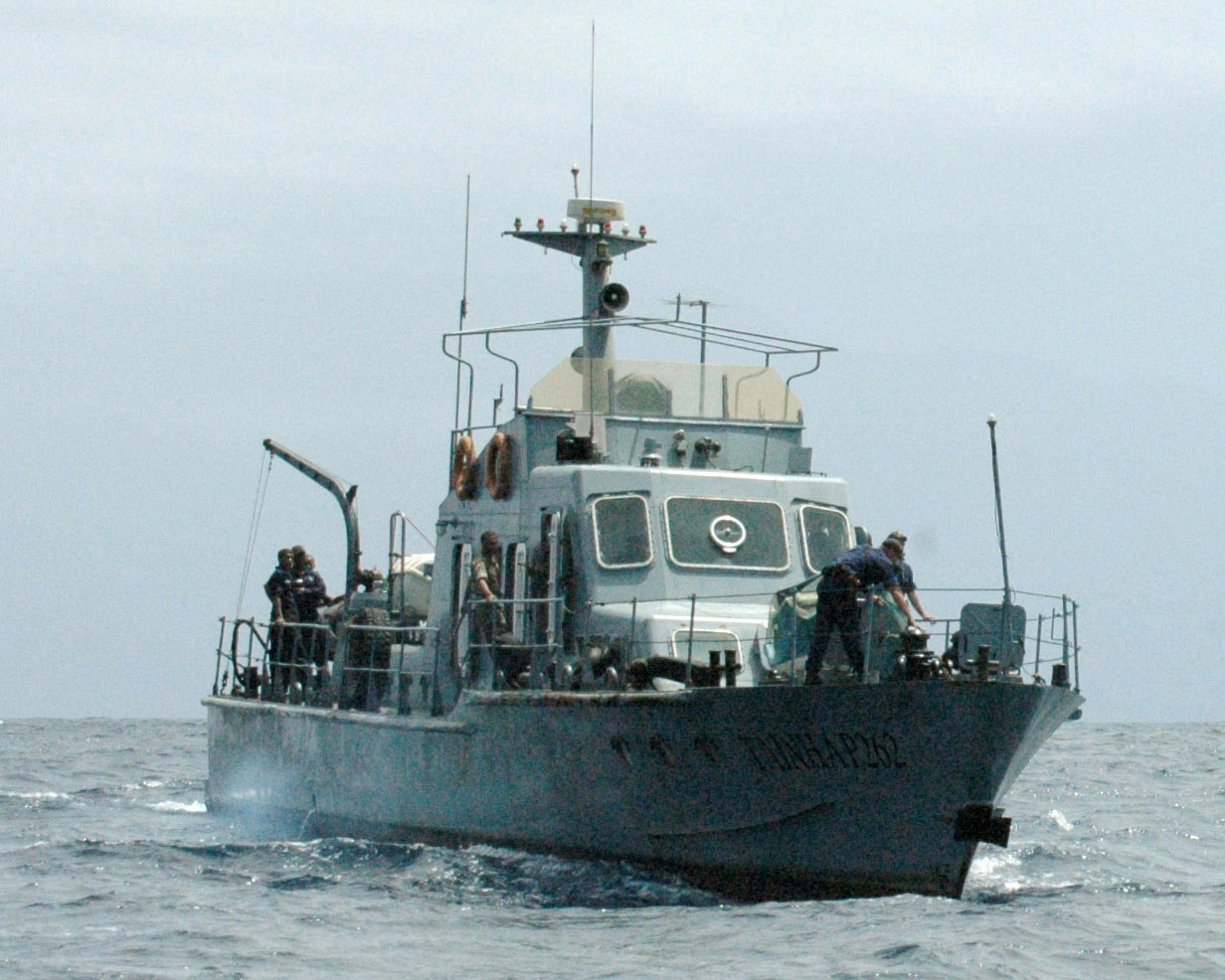
Patrol boat Tainha (P 262)

The Cape Verdean Army used to have its own air arm; after personnel training received from the USSR in 1982, three Antonov An-26 aircraft were delivered to Cape Verde – these were believed to be the only military aircraft possessed by the nation. However these three aircraft were supplemented in 1991 by a Dornier 228 light aircraft equipped for use by the Coast Guard, and, in the late 1990s by an EMB-110 aircraft from Brazil, similarly equipped for maritime operations. The government has been in negotiations with China to acquire multirole helicopters for both military and civilian use.

==== Current inventory ====
Aircraft	Origin	Type	Variant	In service	Notes
Maritime patrol
CASA C-212	Spain / Europe	Maritime patrol / SAR		1	Flown for the Coast Guard
Dornier 228	Germany	Maritime patrol / SAR		2	Flown for the Coast Guard
Helicopters
Harbin Z-9	China	SAR / Utility		2	Flown for the Coast Guard

=== Vessels ===
- 1 Kondor I patrol craft – 360 tons full load – commissioned 1970
- 1 Peterson MK 4 patrol craft – 22 tons – commissioned 1993
- 1 other patrol craft – 55 tons
- 1 Damen Stan 5009 patrol vessel – Guardião (P511) – commissioned 2012
