= TTS Moruga =

Patrol vessel of the Trinidad and Tobago Coast Guard

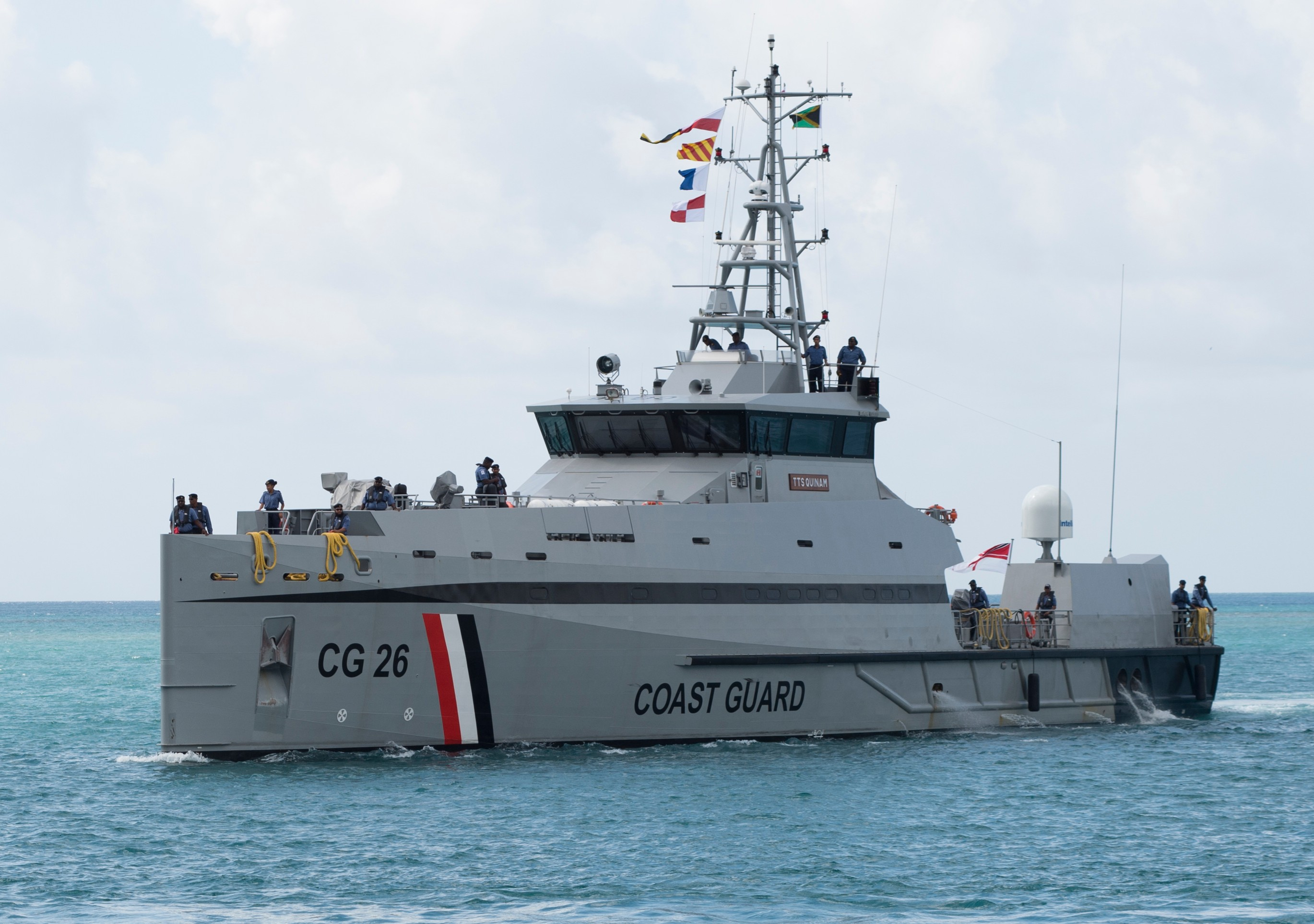
Sister ship TTS Quinam.

TTS Moruga CG 27 is a patrol vessel operated by Trinidad and Tobago. It is a Damen Stan 5009 patrol vessel, an innovative design with a Damen Group axe bow. The 5009 in the design indicates that the vessel is 50 metres (160 ft) long and 9 metres (30 ft) wide.

In January 2018 the vessel was used in the burial at sea of George Maxwell Richards, formerly President of Trinidad and Tobago.

The Moruga's first captain was Lieutenant Commander Aldon Jasper.
