= TTS Brighton =

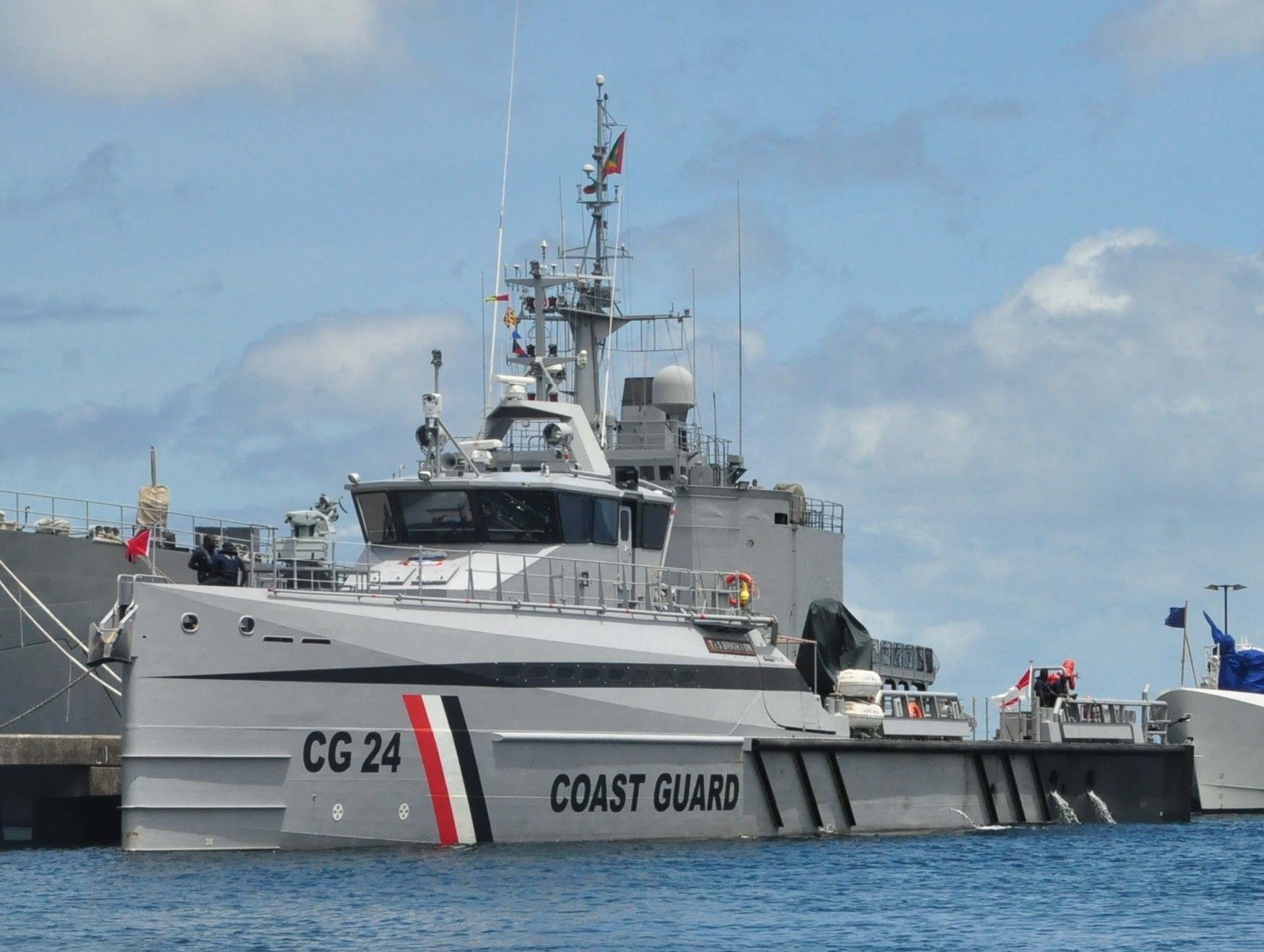

TTS Brighton is a patrol vessel of the Trinidad and Tobago Defence Force, based on the Damen Stan 5009 patrol vessel design.

== Design ==
The Damen Group's design incorporates an axe bow. The 5009 in the model name shows that the vessels are 50 metres (160 ft) long and 9 metres (30 ft) wide. The vessels maximum speed is 30 knots (56 km/h). Her main armament is a Rheinmetall Seahawk a remotely controlled 20mm autocannon.

== Operational history ==
In October, 2017, Brighton carried emergency relief supplies to Dominica, which had just been struck by Hurricane Maria.
