= United Arab Emirates Coast Guard =

Agency overview
- Formed: 1977

Jurisdictional structure
- Operations jurisdiction: United Arab Emirates
- Specialist jurisdiction: Coastal patrol, marine border protection, marine search and rescue

The United Arab Emirates Coast Guard is the official coast guard agency of the United Arab Emirates and is primarily responsible for the protection of the UAE's coastline through regulation of maritime laws, maintenance of seamarks, border control, anti-smuggling operations and other services. The UAE Coast Guard is an affiliated branch of the United Arab Emirates Armed Forces and works in close coordination with the United Arab Emirates Navy.

== History ==
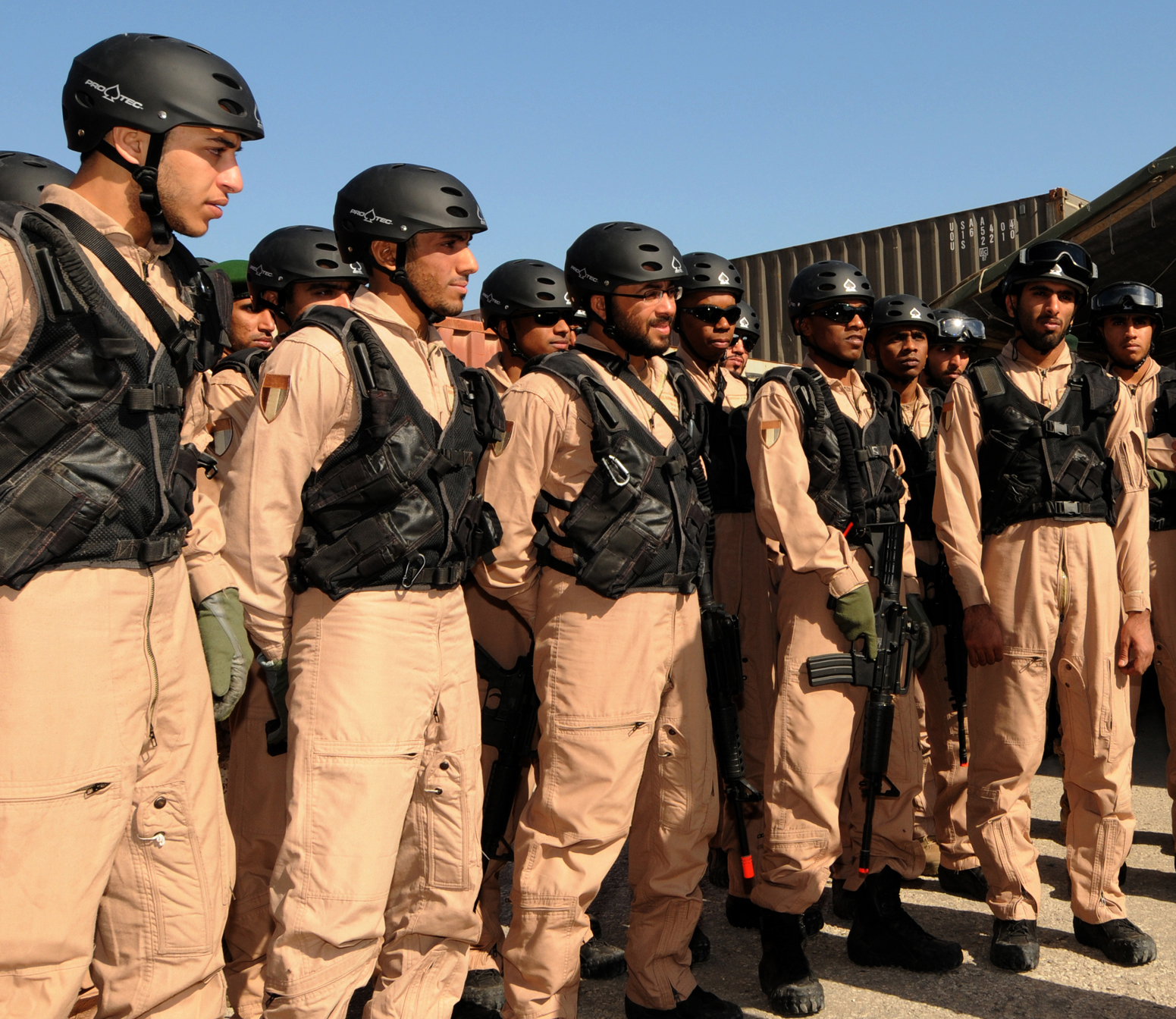
UAE Coast Guard in joint training exercise with the United States Coast Guard

The UAE Coast Guard was first established in 1977 under the control of the UAE Ministry of Interior. Its initial role was a para-military one rather than a Navy. It was used to patrol maritime borders and intercept foreign small craft that illegally entered its waters. Thus, its role was framed as a law enforcement issue rather than a military responsibility.

The Coast Guard remained under Ministry of Interior control until 2001 when control was transferred to the UAE Navy. This change was likely in response to increased concern over the possibility of terrorist attacks on critical infrastructure in the UAE's littoral zone and on its islands in the post-9/11 world, and the effectiveness of the Coast Guard in countering this threat.

By the beginning of 2004, the Coast Guard had become a separate service within the UAE Armed Forces, and was no longer the responsibility of the Navy. In general, the Coast Guard has been responsible for all law-enforcement activities across the country's ports, as well as inshore and offshore waters, as far as this is within its capabilities. In areas where the Coast guard is unable to do this, the Navy is expected to assume the Coast Guard's responsibility.

The Coast Guard gained attention in August 2010 when officials foiled a terrorist attack on a Japanese oil tanker which was damaged in the Strait of Hormuz. In August 2020, three Coast Guard vessels intercepted several fishing boats that violated the territorial waters of the UAE north of Sir Abu Nu'ayr island in the Emirate of Sharjah. The fishing boats did not comply and the Coast Guard followed the rules of engagement in order to interdict them.

== Equipment and personnel ==
The UAE Coast Guard consists of roughly 1,200 personnel. They operate various small watercraft which are used for coastal and harbor patrol. In 2012, these vessels were reported to include roughly three dozen patrol craft, two dozen harbor patrol craft, six coastal patrol craft, and numerous raiding and work boats.

In 2010, the coast guard awarded the Abu Dhabi Ship Building Co (ADSB) a contract to build 12 patrol boats called the Al-Saber class.

Class	Type	Photo	Number of Ships	Notes
Patrol craft
Al-Saber-class	Patrol craft			Domestic
Protector-class	Patrol craft		2	From the United Kingdom
Shark-33 design	Patrol craft		11	From the United States
Camcraft P-63A design	Patrol craft		16	From the United States
Camcraft 77-foot design	Patrol craft		5	
Barracuda/FPB-class	Harbor patrol craft		24	From the United States
GC-23-class	Coastal patrol craft		6	From Italy
Damen Stan Patrol 5009	Coastal patrol craft		3	
Other vessels
Sea Spray	Raiding craft		54	From the United States
Halmatic Works 16-M design	Work boat		12	From the United States
