= Military ranks of Trinidad and Tobago =

The Military ranks of Trinidad and Tobago are the military insignia used by the Trinidad and Tobago Defence Force. Being a former colony of the United Kingdom, Trinidad and Tobago shares a rank structure similar to that of the United Kingdom.

== Commissioned officer ranks ==
The rank insignia of commissioned officers.

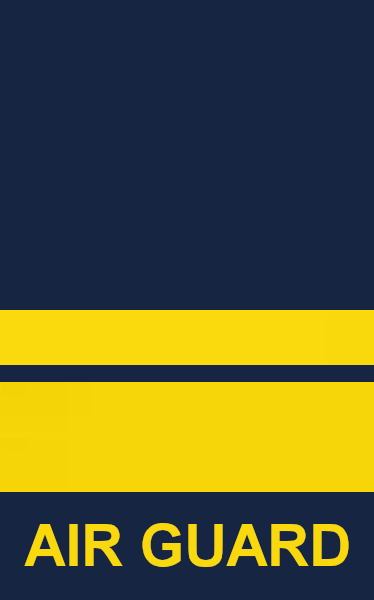
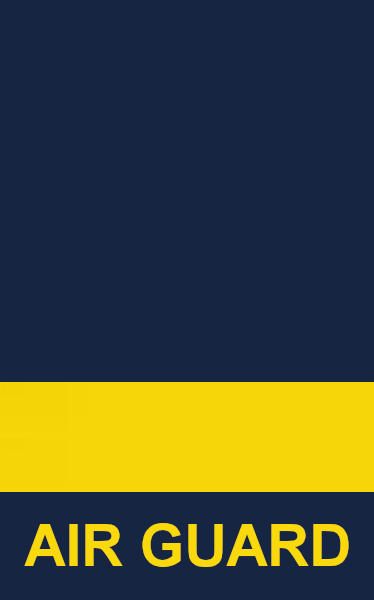
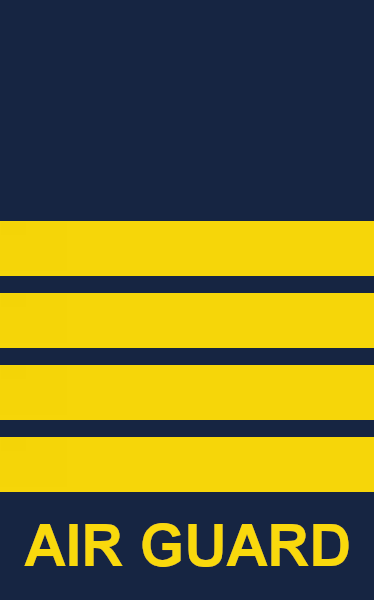
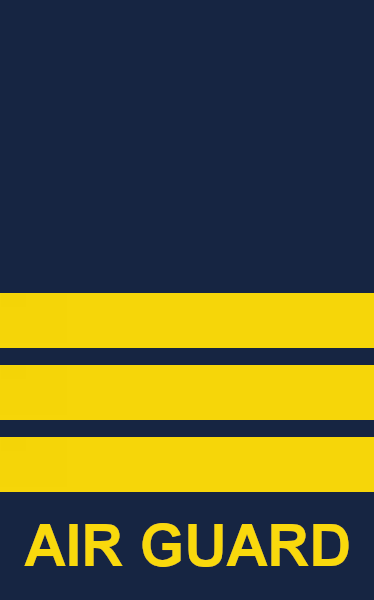
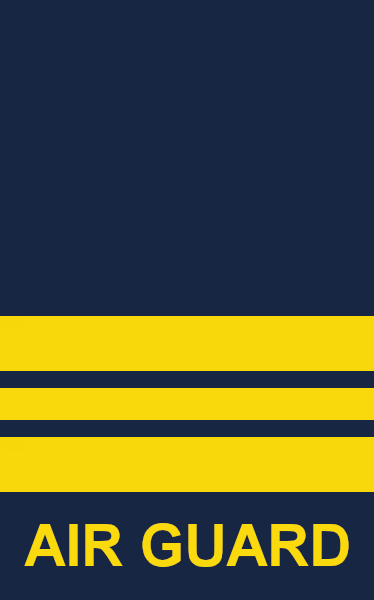
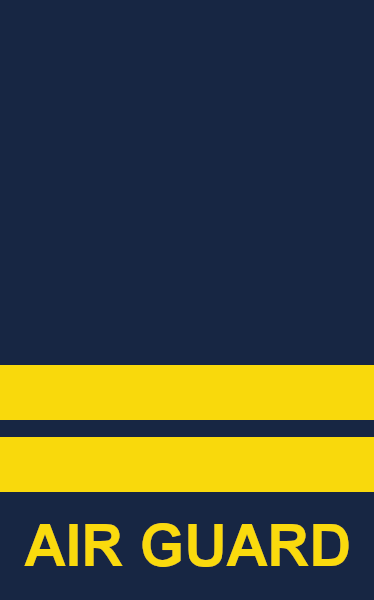
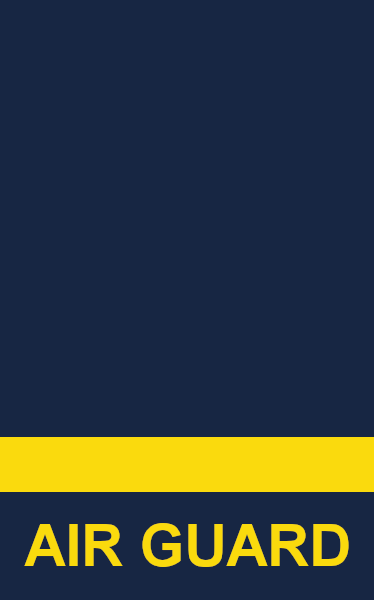
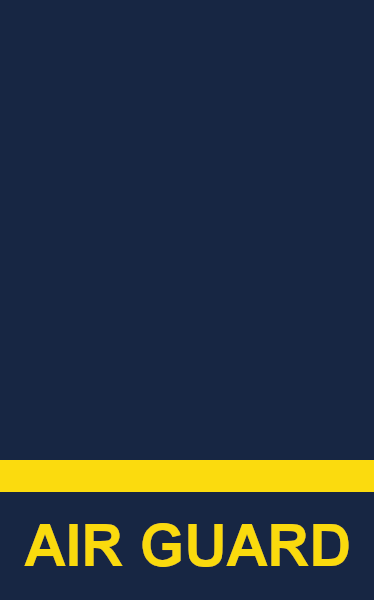
Rank group	General / flag officers		Senior officers			Junior officers
Trinidad and Tobago Regiment
Trinidad and Tobago Regiment	Major general	Brigadier general	Colonel	Lieutenant colonel	Major	Captain	Lieutenant	Second lieutenant
Trinidad and Tobago Coast Guard
Trinidad and Tobago Coast Guard	Rear admiral	Commodore	Captain	Commander	Lieutenant commander	Lieutenant	Sub-lieutenant	Acting sub-lieutenant
Trinidad and Tobago Air Guard
Trinidad and Tobago Air Guard	Air vice marshal	Air commodore	Group captain	Wing commander	Squadron leader	Flight lieutenant	Flying officer	Pilot officer
Rank group	General / flag officers		Senior officers			Junior officers

=== Student officer ranks ===
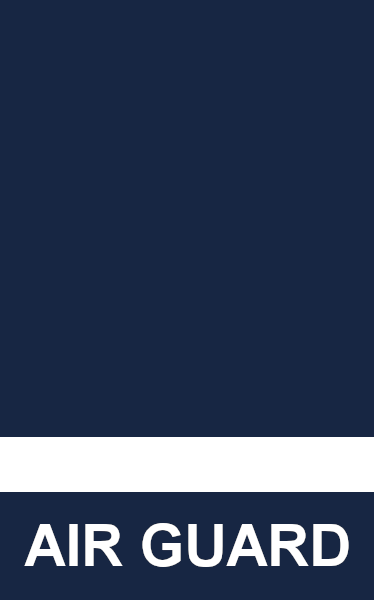
Rank group	Student officer
Trinidad and Tobago Regiment
Trinidad and Tobago Regiment		Officer cadet
Trinidad and Tobago Coast Guard
Trinidad and Tobago Coast Guard	Midshipman	Officer cadet
Trinidad and Tobago Air Guard
Trinidad and Tobago Air Guard		Officer cadet

== Other ranks ==
The rank insignia of non-commissioned officers and enlisted personnel.

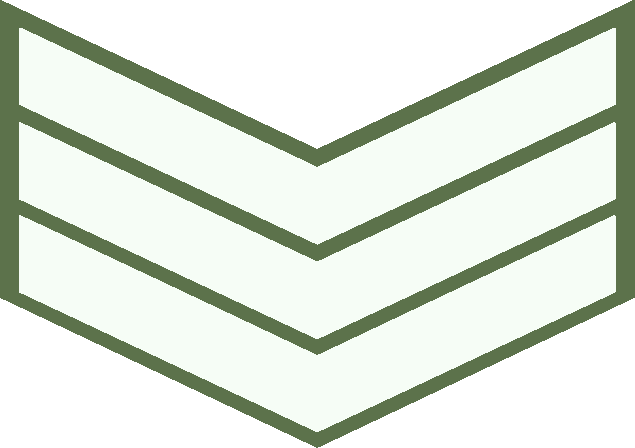
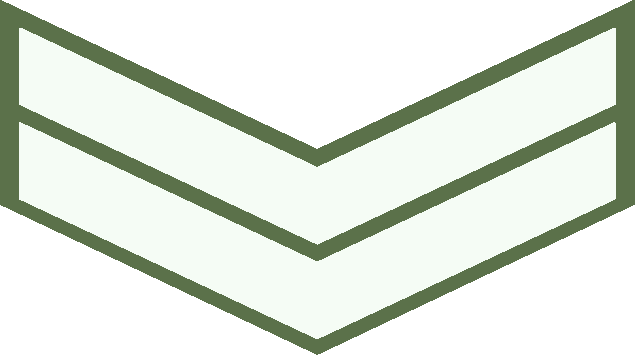
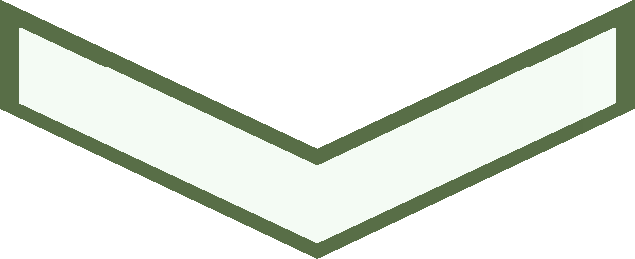
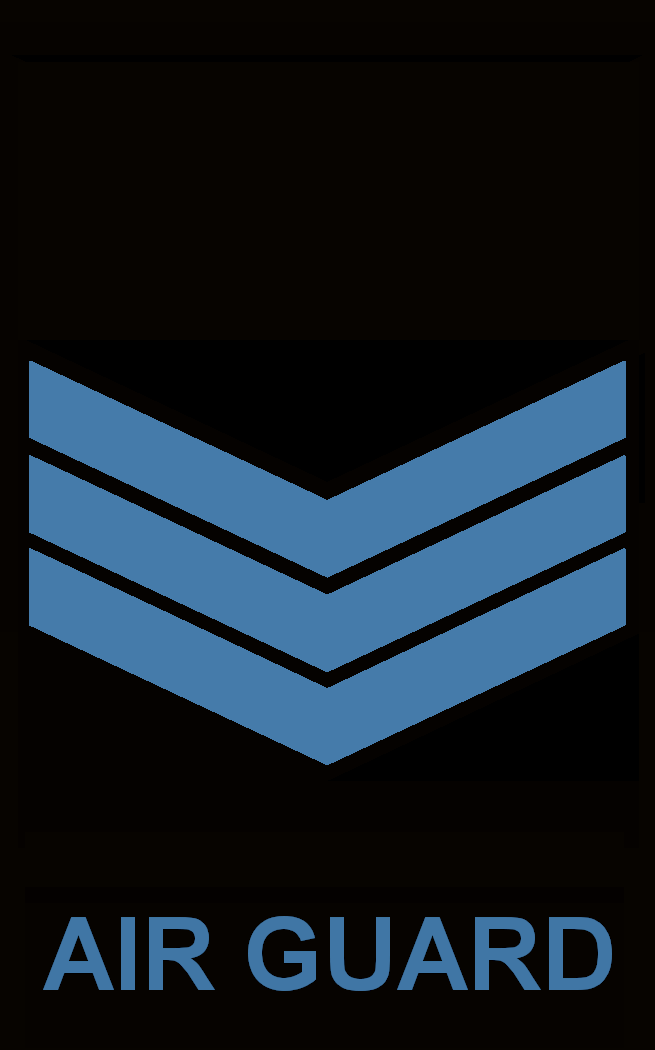
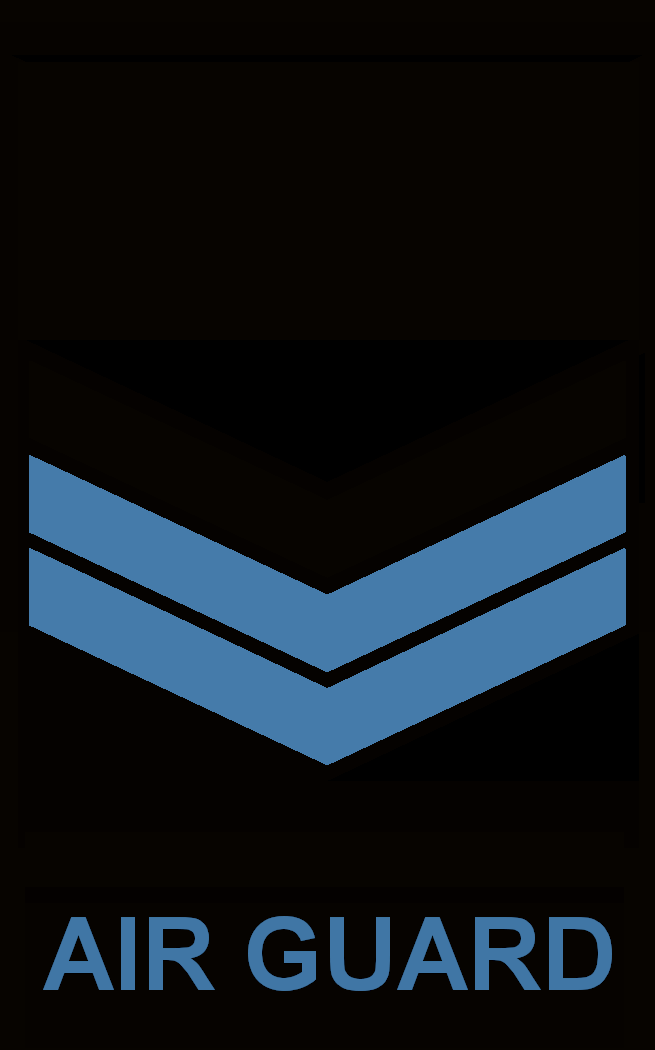
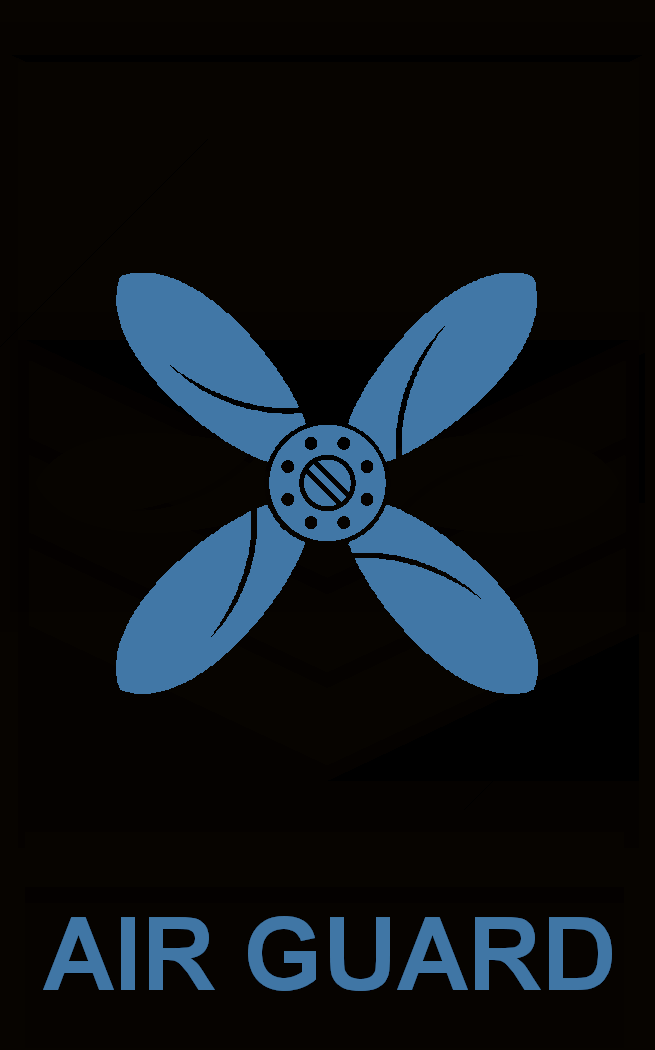
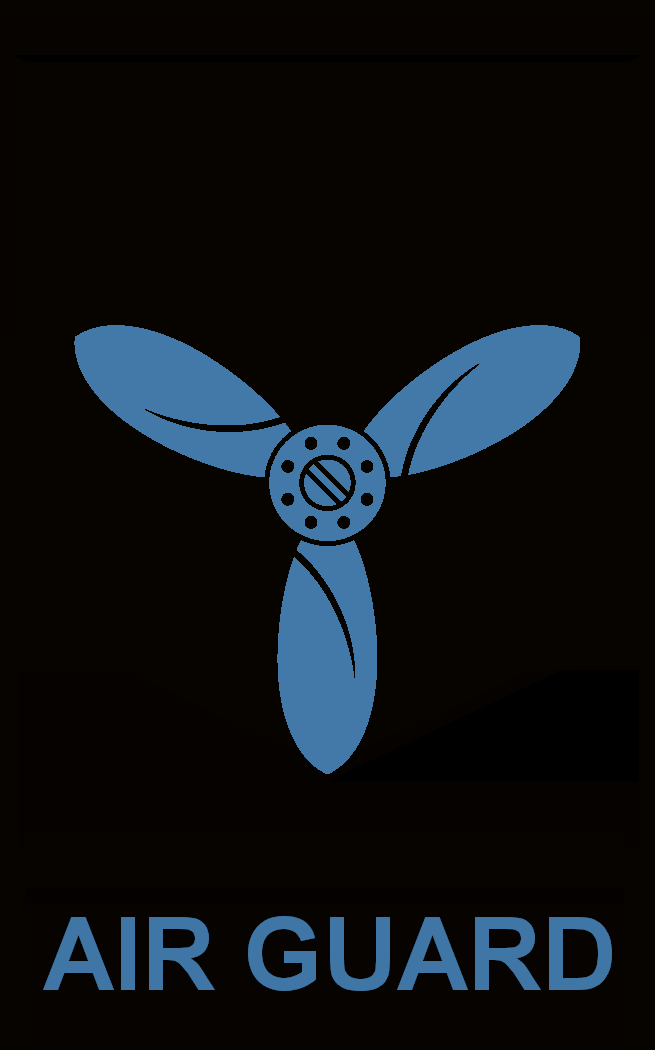
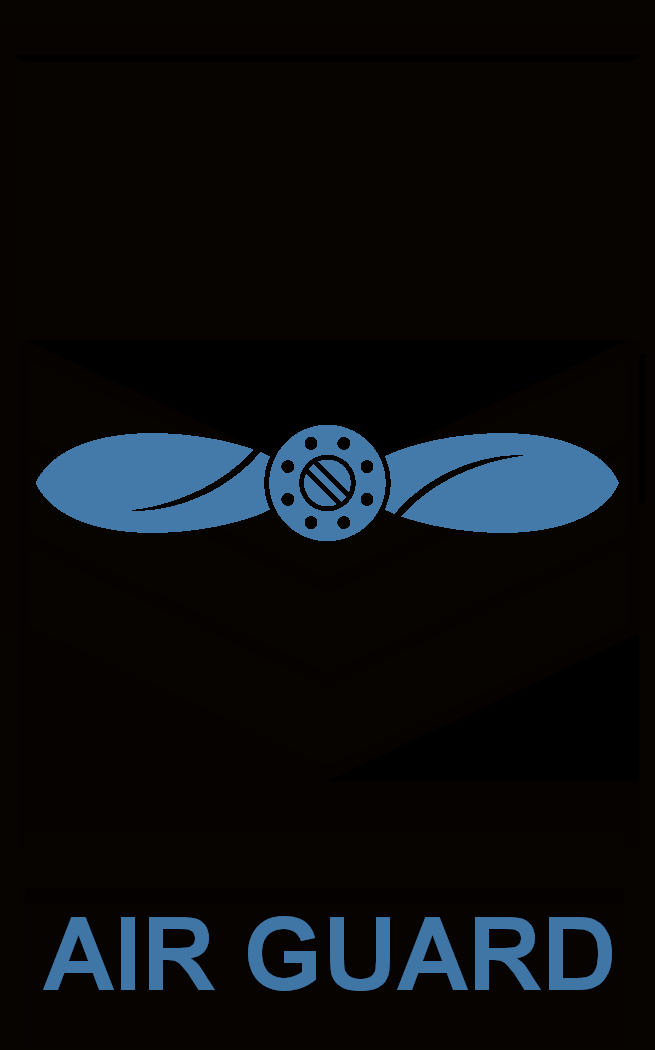
Rank group	Senior NCOs				Junior NCOs		Enlisted
Trinidad and Tobago Regiment							No insignia
Trinidad and Tobago Regiment	Warrant officer class 1	Warrant officer class 2	Staff sergeant	Sergeant	Corporal	Lance corporal	Private
Trinidad and Tobago Coast Guard							No insignia		No insignia
Trinidad and Tobago Coast Guard	Fleet chief petty officer	Chief petty officer		Petty officer	Leading seaman		Able seaman		Ordinary seaman
Trinidad and Tobago Air Guard
Trinidad and Tobago Air Guard	Warrant officer I	Warrant officer II		Sergeant	Corporal		Senior technician	Senior aircraftman	Junior aircraftman/ Junior technician
Rank group	Senior NCOs				Junior NCOs		Enlisted
