= Trinidad and Tobago Defence Force =

Military forces of Trinidad and Tobago

- Trinidad and Tobago Defence Force emblem

- Trinidad and Tobago Defence Force flag
- Founded: 1 June 1962; 64 years ago
- Service branches: Trinidad and Tobago Regiment; Trinidad and Tobago Coast Guard; Trinidad and Tobago Air Guard; Defence Force Reserves
- Headquarters: Chaguaramas
- Website: Official website

Leadership
- Commander-in-Chief: Christine Kangaloo
- Prime Minister: Kamla Persad-Bissessar
- Minister of Defence: Wayne Sturge
- Chief of Defence Staff: Commodore Don Polo

Personnel
- Military age: 18 (17 with parental consent)
- Conscription: No
- Active personnel: 5,622
- Reserve personnel: 600

Expenditure
- Percent of GDP: 0.3%

Industry
- Foreign suppliers: Damen Shipyards; Austal

Related articles
- Ranks: Military ranks of Trinidad and Tobago

The Trinidad and Tobago Defence Force (TTDF) is the military organisation responsible for the defence of the twin-island Republic of Trinidad and Tobago. It consists of the Trinidad and Tobago Regiment, the Trinidad and Tobago Coast Guard, the Trinidad and Tobago Air Guard and the Defence Force Reserves.

Each of the three component services of the Trinidad and Tobago Defence Force is responsible for a different role and domain. The Trinidad and Tobago Regiment is responsible for land operations, the Air Guard is responsible for air operations, and the Coast Guard is responsible for maritime operations and simultaneously acts as a law enforcement agency in the maritime area of Trinidad and Tobago.

The Commander in Chief of the Defence Force is the country's President, Christine Kangaloo, it is mostly a ceremonial position. The Ministry of Defence is the current government department that has responsibility for the defence force, since 2025, previously it was the Ministry of National Security. The current Minister of Defence is Wayne Sturge. The operational commander of the TTDF is the Chief of Defence Staff (CDS), with the current CDS being Commodore Don Polo, the former commanding officer of the Coast Guard. He replaced Air Vice Marshal Darryl Daniel, on 7 October 2025, whose appointment as CDS was revoked the same day. Polo was promoted to the rank of Commodore, effective October 14, 2025, a week after first being appointed Chief of Defence Staff (CDS) as a Captain "owing to the exigencies." Rear Admiral Hayden Pritchard was the previous CDS before Darryl Daniel, he retired on 25 March 2019.

== Organisation ==
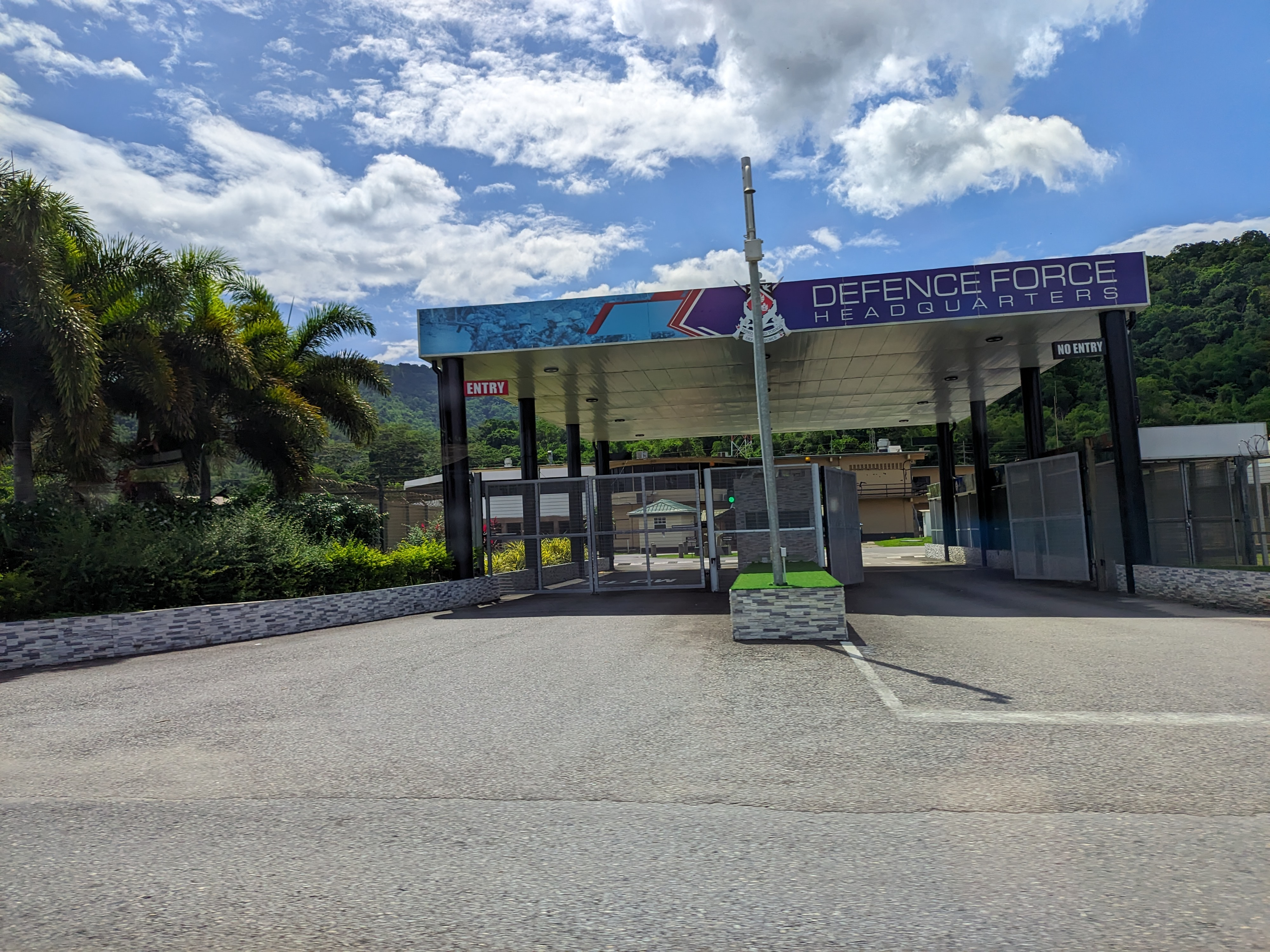
TTDF headquarters, Chaguaramas

The Trinidad and Tobago Defence Force is made up of four distinct arms; The Regiment/"Army" (TTR), the Coast Guard (TTCG), the Air Guard (TTAG) and the Defence Force Reserves (TTDFR), which all fall under the authority of the Ministry of Defence. The TTDF has the world's only Military steelband.

The Trinidad and Tobago Defence Force (TTDF) comprises 5,622 uniformed personnel, 1 permanent, 35 contracted, and 156 daily paid civilian staff. The President of Trinidad and Tobago is the Commander-in-Chief, while the Chief of Defence Staff (CDS) is responsible for the TTDF's operational use, subject to the Minister of Defence's directions as outlined in Section 191(2) of the Defence Act, Chapter 14:01.

=== Defence Force Headquarters ===
The CDS leads the Defence Force Headquarters, supported by the VCDS and the Commanding Officers of the TTDF's four formations. The TTDF Headquarters includes administrative and operational units.

Administration provides support services such as Human Resource Management, Finance, and Registry. Key roles include:

1. Chief of Defence Staff (CDS): Responsible for strategic direction, operational control, and overall management.
2. Vice Chief of Defence Staff (VCDS): Coordinates staff activities and assists the CDS in achieving the Force's operational mandate.
3. Information Systems: Manages the Force's computer hardware and software.
4. Public Relations Department: Coordinates public relations and manages public affairs.
5. Staff Judge Advocate: Handles legal matters for the Force.
6. Inspector General: Investigates policies and procedures related to the Force's mission.
7. Force Development Strategy and Management: Develops, maintains, and integrates capabilities and training for Defence Force personnel.
8. Strategic Logistics: Plans and executes the movement, supply, and maintenance of resources.
9. Human Resources Department: Manages personnel readiness, monitors human resource management, and provides related policies and services.
10. Finance Department: Facilitates budget planning, preparation, and manages all financial matters.

Operations utilizes a Joint/United Staff System with the following components:

1. Directors and Military Attachés: Integrate the Force's operational management with national security priorities.
2. Intelligence Department: Collects data and generates intelligence for Force activities.
3. Operations Department: Coordinates all operations within the Force.
4. Unit Command and Administration Services: Coordinates supply, maintenance, transportation, and service functions.
5. Medical Department: Provides technical medical advice to Command and medical services to Force members.

== Regiment (Army) ==
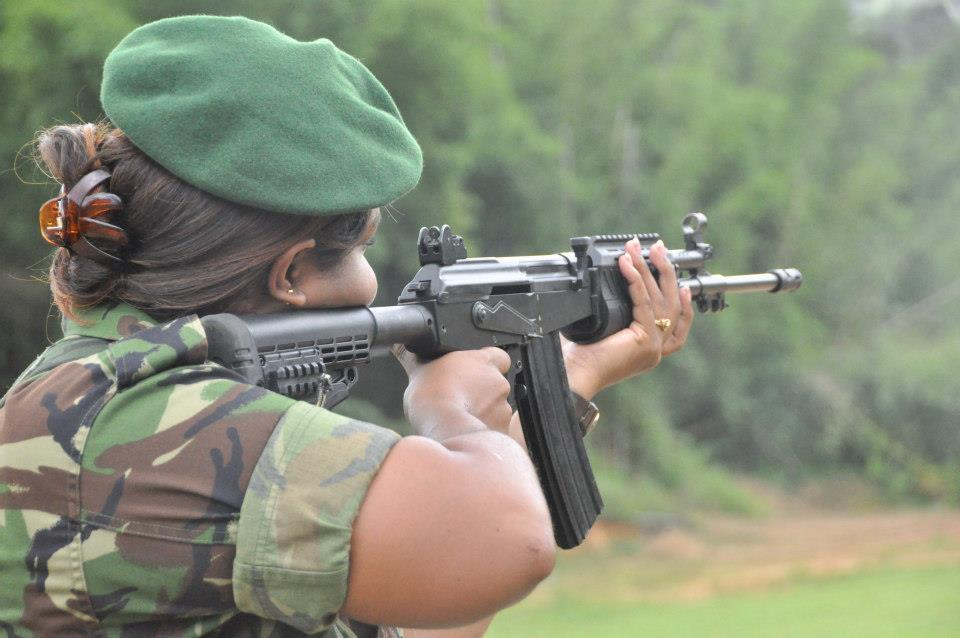
Trinidad and Tobago soldier in training

The Trinidad and Tobago Regiment (TTR) is the main ground force element of the Trinidad and Tobago Defence Force. It has approximately 3000 men and women, organized into four battalions and a Regiment Headquarters. The regiment has two primary roles: maintaining the internal security of Trinidad and Tobago and support to civil law enforcement. The Commanding Officer of the Regiment is Colonel Dwayne Edwards, effective October 14, 2025. He replaced Colonel Keston Charles, whose appointment as CO Regiment was revoked by the government.

Also, as one of the larger military forces in the region, the Trinidad and Tobago Regiment is also one of the main units used in peacekeeping and humanitarian situations from the Caribbean region.

Although it is called the Trinidad & Tobago Regiment, the TTR is in fact structured more like a light infantry brigade, with a pair of infantry battalions, plus engineering and logistic support units:

1st Battalion (Infantry), Trinidad and Tobago Regiment: This is a light infantry battalion. It is located at Camp Ogden, Long Circular Road, St James.

2nd Battalion (Infantry), Trinidad and Tobago Regiment: This is also a light infantry battalion. Formerly located at Camp Mausica, since then it has been relocated to the Chaguaramas Heliport and La Romain.

3rd Battalion (1st Engineer Battalion): This provides engineering support, humanitarian assistance and disaster relief. It is located at Camp Cumuto, Wallerfield.

4th Battalion (Support and Service Battalion): This provides logistic and administrative support for the regiment. It is located at the Teteron Barracks, Teteron Bay, Chaguaramas.

The Regiment also maintains a Camp Omega, at Chaguaramas, which is used primarily for infantry training.

== Special Forces ==
Trinidad and Tobago has a number of Special Units; however, the notable units are assets under the Trinidad and Tobago Defence Force (TTDF). The Special Forces Operations Detachment (SFOD) belongs to the Trinidad and Tobago Regiment with the motto "To Find a Way". SF's training mirrors the US Special Forces.

The Special Naval Unit (SNU) is the maritime component of the Special Operational Forces belonging to the Trinidad and Tobago Coast Guard and runs heavily on US Navy SEAL doctrines and training.

These units fulfill specific roles and functions, and work collaboratively at times. Taskings from Jungle Operations (SFOD), Direct Action, Recon, PSD, Maritime Ops (SNU) and internal and foreign consultancy.

== Coast Guard ==
Naval Ensign

The Trinidad and Tobago Coast Guard is the seagoing branch of the TTDF which was established on 1 June 1962 and commissioned into service less than 3 months later on 27 August 1962. The Coast Guard consists of a number of vessels designated CG<number>. The Commanding Officer of the Coast Guard is Captain Akenathon Isaac, with his promotion to the rank of Captain and appointment as CO effective October 14, 2025. He replaced Captain Don Riguel Polo, who was appointed Chief of Defence Staff (CDS) on October 7, 2025, and was promoted to Commodore, effective October 14, 2025.

Its mission statements is "To Defend the Sovereign Good of the Republic of Trinidad and Tobago and to provide on a continuous basis, quality service for security and safety within the Maritime Boundaries, and in any other area of responsibility agreed to by the State to fulfill its International Obligations".

Its motto is "Service Before Self".

The Coast Guard is primarily involved with Drug Trade interdiction as well as Search and Rescue within the waters of Trinidad and Tobago and neighbouring Islands. However, the Coast Guard has been involved in major incidents. During the 1970 Army Mutiny in Trinidad and Tobago, the Coast Guard prevented the mutineers from convoying to Port of Spain by firing on an access road from the Regiment base at Teteron Barracks in Chaguaramas. The Coast Guard also played a role during the 1990 Jamaat al Muslimeen coup attempt, providing logistical and naval support to the ground forces of the Regiment, posted outside the besieged city limits.

National Roles of the Trinidad and Tobago Coast Guard include:

- Surveillance of the Waters under T & T Jurisdiction
- Logistical Support to T & T Land Forces
- Port Security (ISPS Code)
- Assistance in Scientific Research
- Aid to Civil Law Enforcement
- Anti-Smuggling / Counter-Narcotic Operations (MOF)
- Fisheries Protection and Enforcement (MAL&MR)
- Pollution Surveillance and Enforcement (MPU&E)
- Safety of Shipping (MOW&T)

Operational Tasks

- Keeping surveillance of the nation's off-shore installations
- Environmental protection, minor salvage and local maritime surveys
- Cooperating with other naval forces.

=== Fleet ===
Between 2001 and 2016, the Trinidad and Tobago Coast Guard fleet included TTS Nelson, an Island-class patrol vessel purchased from the Royal Navy.

In April 2007, the Coast Guard contracted for three offshore patrol vessels from VT Shipbuilding (later BAE Systems Surface Ships) in Portsmouth, England. Construction of the Port of Spain-class corvettes Port of Spain, Scarborough and San Fernando suffered significant delays and, in September 2010, though substantially complete, the Government of Trinidad and Tobago cancelled the order. The Brazilian Navy acquired all three ships as their Amazonas-class corvettes.

On 29 April 2015, the Ministry of National Security placed orders with the Dutch company Damen Shipbuilders for four 51-metre (167 ft) 28-knot (52 km/h; 32 mph) coastal patrol vessels, two 54-metre (177 ft) fast utility boats and six 11-metre (36 ft) 53-knot (98 km/h; 61 mph) interceptors.

In August 2018, the government contracted with Austal to build two Cape-class patrol boats at Henderson, Western Australia, scheduled for delivery in mid-2020. The two vessels, Port of Spain and Scarborough, were delivered to the TTCG in May 2021.

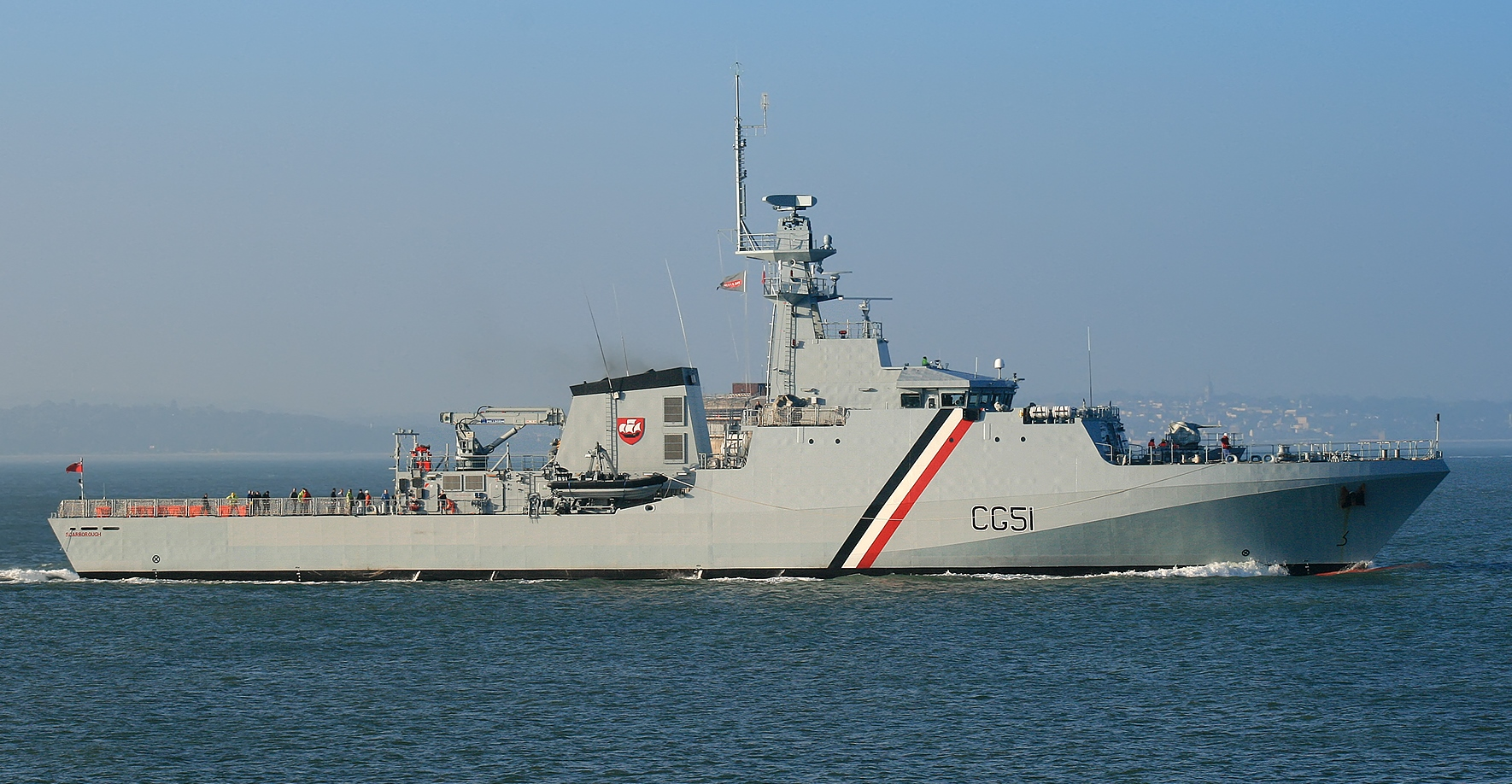
Scarborough at Portsmouth in 2010

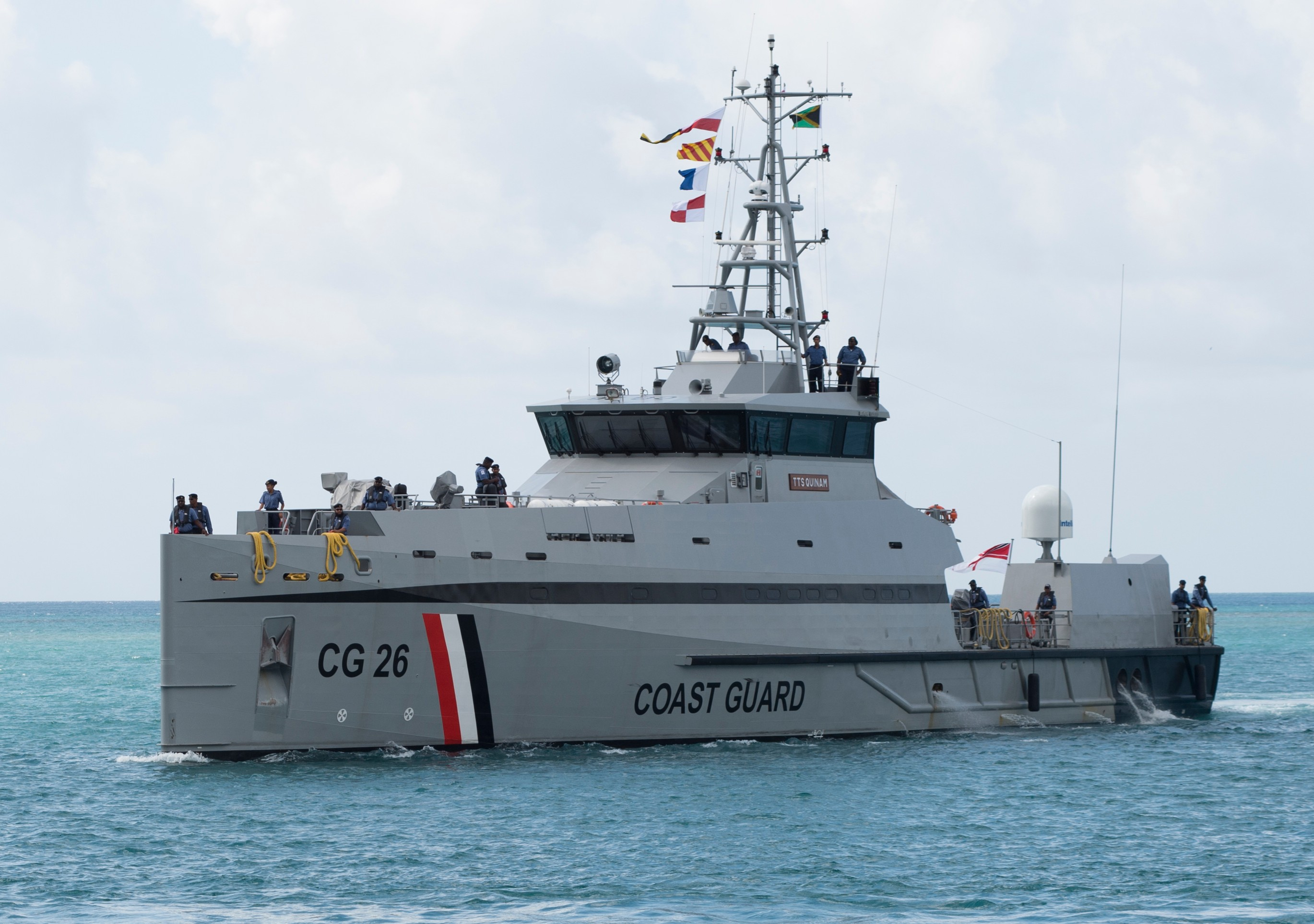
Quinam in 2016

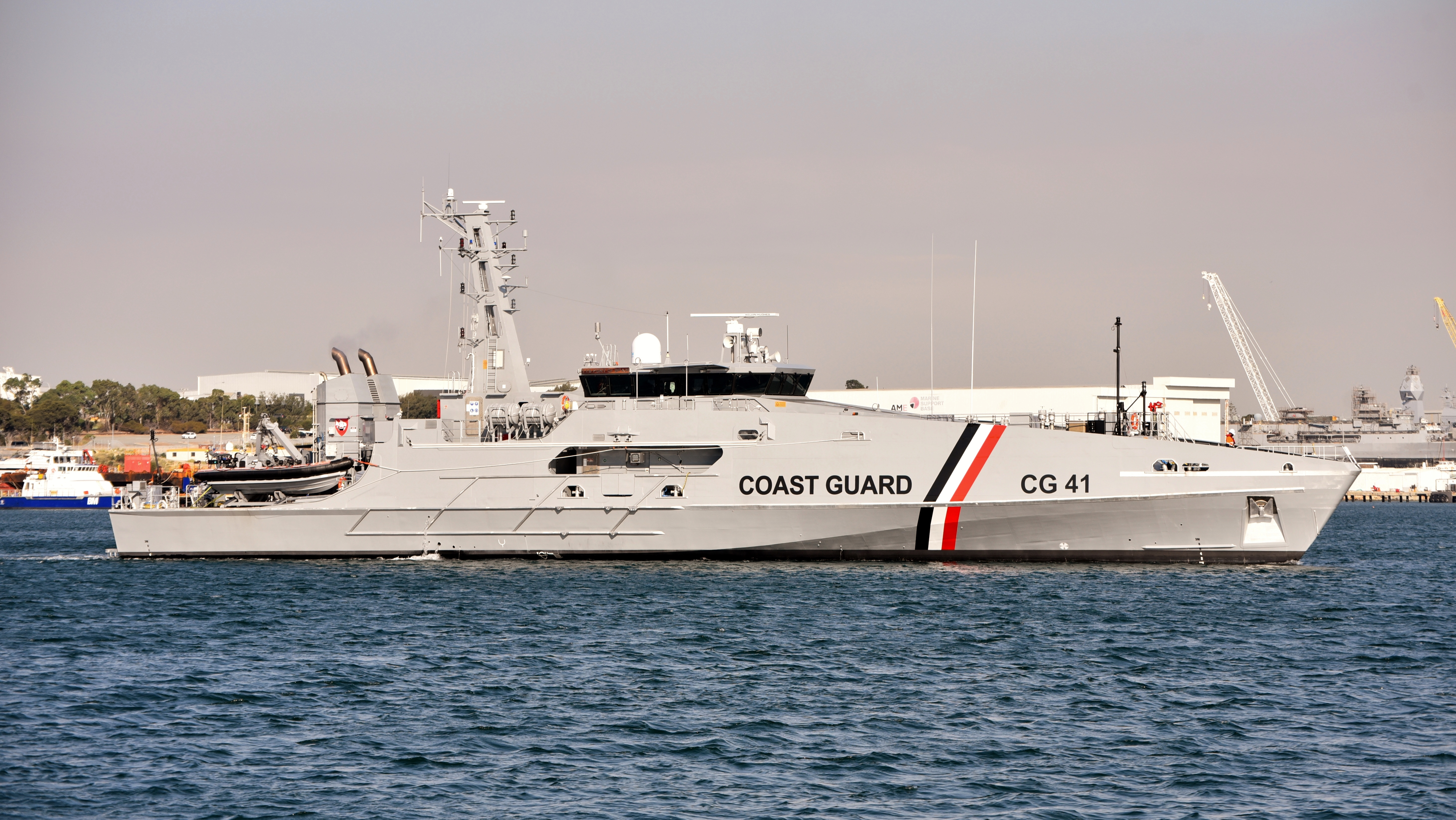
Port of Spain before delivery in 2021

Vessel	Hull No.	Origin	Shipbuilder	In service	Notes
Offshore patrol vessels
TTS Nelson	CG 20	United Kingdom	Hall, Russell	2001-2016	former HMS Orkney
TTS Nelson II	CG 60	China	Huangpu Wenchong	2015-	1000-ton class Chinese surveillance vessel
TTS Port of Spain	CG 41	Australia	Austal	2021-	Cape class
TTS Scarborough	CG 42	Australia	Austal	2021-	Cape class
Coastal patrol vessels
TTS Scarlet Ibis	CG 11	Australia	Austal		Scarlet Ibis class
TTS Hibiscus	CG 12	Australia	Austal		Scarlet Ibis class
TTS Humming Bird	CG 13	Australia	Austal		Scarlet Ibis class
TTS Chanonia	CG 14	Australia	Austal		Scarlet Ibis class
TTS Poui	CG 15	Australia	Austal		Scarlet Ibis class
TTS Teak	CG 16	Australia	Austal		Scarlet Ibis class
TTS Speyside	CG 25	Netherlands	Damen		Damen Stan Patrol 5009
TTS Quinam	CG 26	Netherlands	Damen		Stan Patrol 5009
TTS Moruga	CG 27	Netherlands	Damen		Stan Patrol 5009
TTS Carli Bay	CG 28	Netherlands	Damen		Stan Patrol 5009
Support vessels
TTS Point Lisas	CG 23	Netherlands	Damen	2015-	Damen Stan Patrol 5009
TTS Brighton	CG 24	Netherlands	Damen		Stan Patrol 5009; referred to as La Brea during construction

== Air Guard ==
Air Guard badge

Air Guard roundel

The Air Wing of the Trinidad and Tobago Defence force was formed on 15 February 1966, and was initially part of the Trinidad and Tobago Coast Guard and was called the Air Wing of the Coast Guard or the Air Wing. In 1977, it was separated as its own entity. In 2005 it was renamed the Trinidad & Tobago Air Guard (TTAG). Its bases are at Piarco International Airport, Crown Point International Airport, and the Heliport at Chaguaramas. Its purposes are to protect and patrol Trinidad and Tobago's airspace, and is also used for transport, search and rescue, and liaison. The current commander of the Air Guard is Group Captain Kemba Hannays, who took over from Kester Weekes, in a promotion and appointment ceremony on July 10, 2023. Group Captain Weekes took command of the unit in 2019, succeeding then-Air Commodore Daryl Daniel upon his promotion to Chief of Defence Staff in March 2019.

=== Aircraft ===
==== Current inventory ====
Aircraft	Origin	Type	Variant	In service	Notes
Maritime patrol
C-26B Metro	United States	Maritime patrol		2	
Helicopters
AgustaWestland AW139	Italy	Utility / SAR		4	

Its former fleet of aircraft included: One Cessna 337 (O-2A) Skymaster (1966–1972), One Cessna 402 Utililiner (1972–1998), four Aérospatiale Gazelle (1973–1995), One Cessna 172 Skyhawk (1991–1998), Two Piper Navajo 2000–2009, One Cessna 310 1985-2011

Four Agusta Westland AW139 helicopters were intended to be used for surveillance and reconnaissance missions related to search and rescue, border patrol and drug interdiction. Due to lack of funding for maintenance, all helicopters were grounded since 2017. In December 2020, The Minister of National Security announced that one AW139 is back up in the air.

The Minister of National Security announced that the establishment of a military airfield, construction of an operations/administrative building at the Piarco Air Station and new helicopters would be purchased to equip the Air Guard. The minister also promised training from various international bodies. Cabinet agreed to the change of rank designations from naval to the corresponding aviation designations and the creation of 66 ranks on the establishment of the Air Guard.

== Defence Force Reserves ==
Flag of Defence Force Reserves

The Defence Force Reserves, previously called the Volunteer Defence Force, are the non-active duty arm of the Trinidad and Tobago Defence Force. Its mission statement is "To be a highly professional, well-trained combat-ready force that will respond effectively in support of our regular forces and the national community". The Defence Force Reserves are capable of providing reinforcement and be a force multiplier in the event that the Defence Force is called upon to carry out its roles of aid to the civil power. Established in September 1963, its primary purpose at that time was to provide essential reinforcements to the regular force. Today, those roles have grown to include assisting in the promotion of hemispheric and international security and development, with a well-equipped force, trained in a broad range of disciplines and actively involved in community development. In recent years, the Reserves have been called out to assist with law enforcement and most recently to assist with the security in Trinidad's hosting of the 5th Summit of the Americas in 2009. The current Commanding Officer (acting) is Major David Benjamin.

== National Awards ==
National awards of Trinidad and Tobago received by members of the Defence Force.
Year	Award	Receipent	Position	Category	Ref
1969	The Public Service Medal of Merit Gold	Colonel Stanley Johnson	Commander of the Defence Force	Defence	
1970	The Public Service Medal of Merit Silver	Captain David Bloom	Commanding Officer, Trinidad and Tobago Coast Guard	Defence	
1970	The Public Service Medal of Merit Silver	Lt. Commander Mervyn Williams	Officer, Trinidad and Tobago Coast Guard	Defence	
1970	The Public Service Medal of Merit Gold	Brigadier Joffre C.H. Serrette - M.B.E., C.V.O.	Commander of the Defence Force and Military Adviser to the Prime Minister	Defence	
1971	The Public Service Medal of Merit Gold	Captain David Bloom	Commanding Officer, Trinidad and Tobago Coast Guard	Defence	
1978	The Trinity Cross	Brigadier Joffre Charles Harold Serrette - M.O.M., C.V.O., M.B.E., E.D.	Commanding Officer of Trinidad and Tobago Defence Force	Public Service	
1978	The Public Service Medal of Merit Gold	Commander Mervyn Oliver Williams	Commanding Officer, Coast Guard	Public Service	
1979	The Hummingbird Medal Gold	Lieutenant-Commander Anthony Franklin	Captain, T.T.S. Chaguaramas	Coast Guard Duty	
1979	The Hummingbird Medal Gold	Lieutenant-Commander Curtis Roach	Squadron Commander	Coast Guard Duty	
1980	The Trinity Cross	Commander Mervyn Williams - M.O.M.	Chief of Defence Staff	Defence	
1989	The Public Service Medal of Merit Gold	Trinidad and Tobago Coast Guard	Trinidad and Tobago Defence Force Unit	Public Service	
1989	The Public Service Medal of Merit Gold	Commander Jack Eugene Williams E.D.	Commanding Officer, Coast Guard (Retired)	Distinguished Service in the Defence Force and in the Community	
1991	The Trinity Cross	The Regiment of the Trinidad and Tobago Defence Force	Trinidad and Tobago Defence Force Unit	The Preservation of Democracy and Constitutional Government	
2015	The Hummingbird Medal Bronze	Sub Lieutenant Edric Hargreaves	Military Officer, Trinidad & Tobago Defence Force (Coast Guard)	Bravery/Gallantry	
2015	The Hummingbird Medal Bronze	Private Fernando Smith	Soldier, Trinidad & Tobago Defence Force (Regiment)	Bravery/Gallantry	
2019	The Chaconia Medal Gold	Major General Ralph Brown (Retired)	Former Chief of Defence Staff	Public Service	
2019	The Hummingbird Medal Bronze	Mr. Jeremy Lewis	Coast Guard	Gallantry	
2021	The Public Service Medal of Merit Gold	Captain Kent Moore [Posthumously]	Retired Trinidad and Tobago Defence Force Officer	Public Service (National Security)	
2022	The Public Service Medal of Merit Gold	Major General (Retired) Kenrick Maharaj	Chief of Defence Staff	Defence and National Security	
2022	The Public Service Medal of Merit Gold	Major General (Retired) Rodney Smart	Chief Executive Officer, Office of Disaster Preparedness and Management	Defence and National Security	
2022	The Public Service Medal of Merit Gold	Rear Admiral (Retired) Hayden Pritchard	Consultant	Defence and Security	
2024	The Chaconia Medal Gold	Lieutenant Colonel A.R. Norris Baden- Semper (Retired)	Retired Defence Force Officer	Public Service	
2024	The Hummingbird Medal Silver	Major Edouard Wade (Retired)	Retired Defence Force Officer	Music and Culture	

== See also ==
- Naval Base Trinidad
- Waller Air Force Base
- Carlsen Air Force Base
- Trinidad and Tobago Police Service

CARICOM Defence Forces

- Belize Defence Force
- Jamaica Defence Force
- Barbados Defence Force
- Royal Bahamas Defence Force
