= Cape Verde patrol vessel Guardiao =

Patrol vessel based on the Damen Stan 5009 design

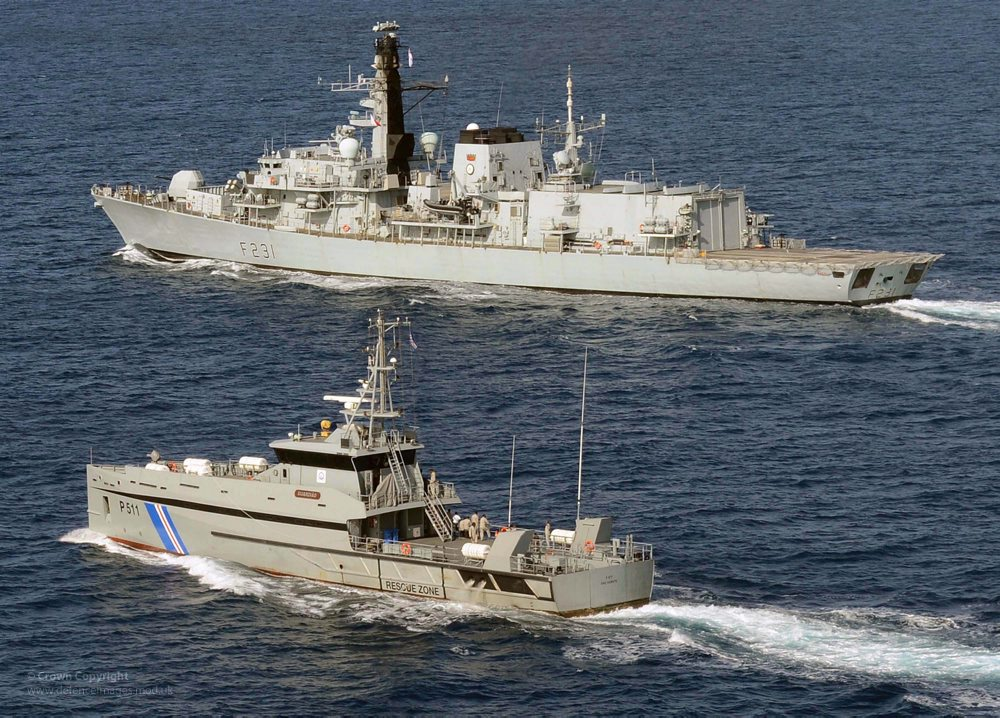
In the foreground, the Cape Verde Coast Guard patrol vessel Guardião. Note the stern launching ramp for deploying and retrieving a pursuit boat, without first coming to a stop.

Guardiao is the Cape Verde Coast Guard's first patrol vessel based on the Damen Stan 5009 design.

The Guardião is equipped with a vertically aligned "axe bow". Damen asserts that a vertical bow has an advantage over a traditional clipper bow, when piercing waves. The clipper bow has more buoyancy when it pierces a wave, which causes the bow to rise and fall with greater intensity—which triggers seasickness in susceptible individuals. Guardião was the first patrol vessel built to a Damen axe-bow design to be launched.

Her crew of 18 either have their own cabin, or share a double cabin.

The ship is equipped with a stern launching ramp, allowing it to deploy and retrieve a 7 metre high-speed daughter craft, without first coming to a stop. Guardião is equipped for the short-term seating of up to 76 individuals, in the case of at-sea rescues, or the interception of undocumented migrants.

== Operational history ==
In 2016 Guardião participated in a joint exercise with US and Belgian vessels.
