= TTS Port of Spain =

Cape class patrol boat of the Trinidad and Tobago Coast Guard

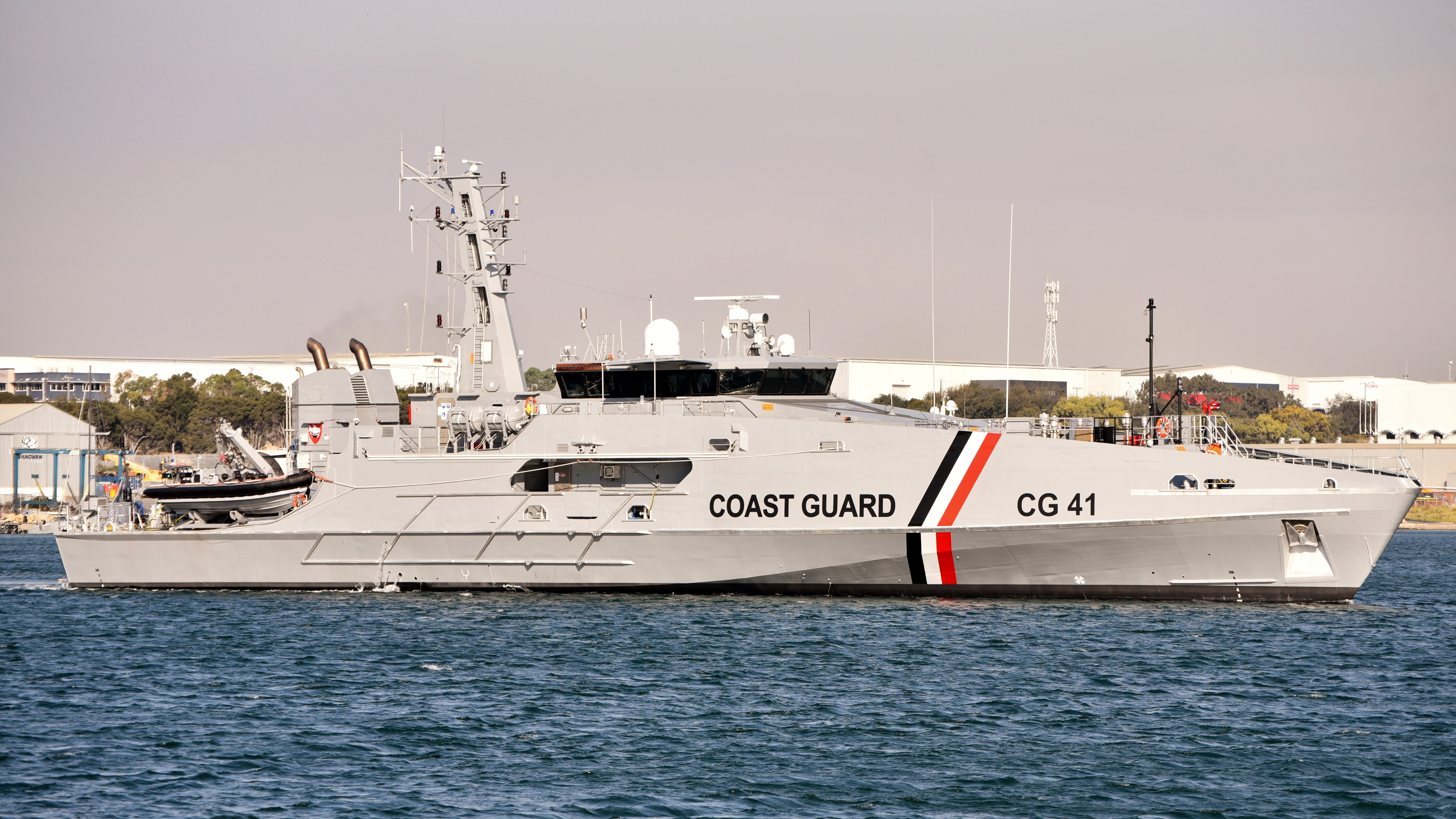
- TTS Port of Spain at Austal shipyards in Henderson, Western Australia in May 2021

History

Trinidad and Tobago
- Namesake: Port of Spain
- Builder: Austal, Henderson, Western Australia
- Commissioned: November 2021
- Identification: IMO number: 9881562; MMSI number: 362053000; Callsign: 9YAR; Pennant number: CG41

General characteristics
- Class & type: Cape-class patrol boat
- Length: 58.1 m (190 ft 7 in)
- Beam: 10.6 m (34 ft 9 in)
- Draught: 3.1 m (10 ft 2 in)
- Propulsion: 2 x Caterpillar 3516C diesels 6,770 horsepower (5,050 kW) 2 shafts, 1 bow thruster
- Speed: 26 knots (48 km/h; 30 mph)
- Range: 4,000 nmi (7,400 km; 4,600 mi) at 12 knots (22 km/h; 14 mph)
- Complement: 27

TTS Port of Spain, named after the capital of Trinidad and Tobago, Port of Spain, is a Cape-class patrol boat of the Trinidad and Tobago Coast Guard.

The $126 million contract to build two Cape-class patrol boats for the Trinidad and Tobago Coast Guard was awarded to Austal in 2019. The two boats, Port of Spain and Scarborough, where delivered in May 2021 and reached Trinidad and Tobago on 7 July that year.

The two vessels were commissioned into the Trinidad and Tobago Coast Guard in November 2021 by the prime minister of Trinidad and Tobago, Keith Rowley. Delivery of the ships had been expected in 2020 but had been delayed because of the effects of the COVID-19 pandemic.
