= Monte Tchota massacre =

2016 mass shooting in Cape Verde

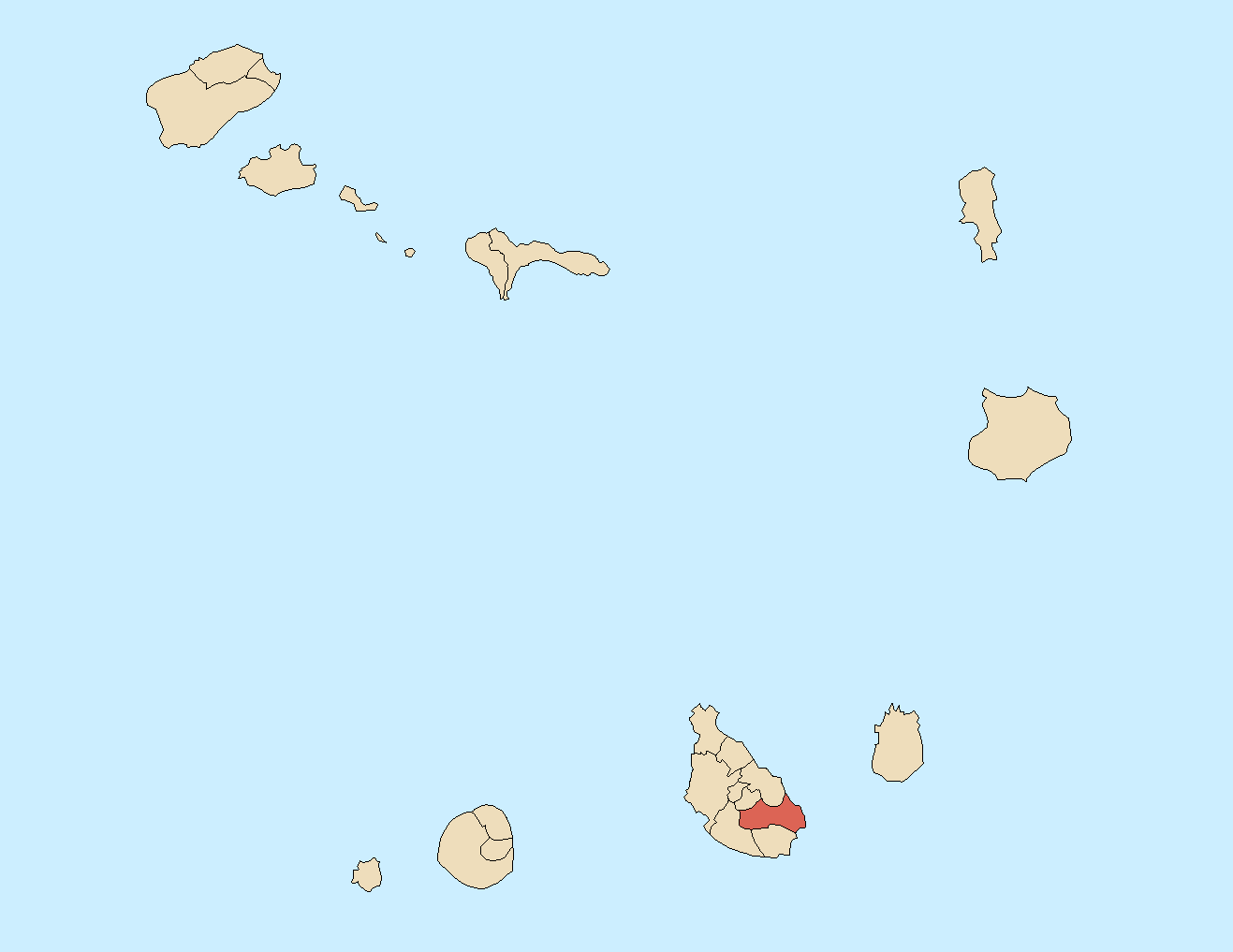
- Location of São Domingos municipality Santiago within Cape Verde
- Location: 15.03777°N 23.62445°W; Monte Tchota, Santiago Island, Cape Verde
- Date: April 25, 2016
- Attack type: Mass shooting
- Weapons: AKM rifle Makarov pistol
- Deaths: 8 Cape Verdean soldiers and 3 civilian contractors (2 Spanish, 1 Cape Verdean)
- Assailant: Manuel António Silva Ribeiro

The Monte Tchota massacre was a mass shooting that occurred at the Monte Tchota army barracks in Cape Verde in the early hours of 25 April 2016.

== Massacre ==
Between the hours of 9:30 and 10:00 in the morning, a rogue FACV soldier identified as 23-year old Manuel Antonio Silva Ribeiro, opened fire at the Monte Tchota army barracks, 27 km (17 miles) north of Praia, the capital of Cape Verde. The shooting occurred as the soldiers were helping to repair antennas at the top of the hill near the barracks. Ribeiro opened fire on his fellow soldiers, shooting eight to death. In the aftermath of the shootings, Ribeiro killed three technicians, two Spanish and a local Cape Verdean, who stopped him from leaving in a getaway car. Eight Kalashnikov rifles and ammunition were stolen from the dead soldiers and later discovered in the abandoned car nearby. The bodies were discovered 24 hours later by a police officer.

== Arrests ==
Ribeiro was arrested in a joint operation by judicial police and the military two days later in a neighbourhood of the capital of Praia.

In response to the incident President Jorge Carlos Fonseca said a personal feud was behind the killings, ruling out an attempted coup or links to the drug trade.

On November 4, 2016, Manuel António Silva Ribeiro was sentenced to 35 years in prison - the maximum sentence available under Cape Verdean law.
