= Chief of Staff of the Armed Forces (Cape Verde) =

- Chefe do Estado-Maior-General das Forças Armadas (Portuguese)
- Incumbent; Manuel António Pereira Semedo since 8 November 2025
- Armed Forces of Cabo Verde
- Style: Chief of Staff of the Armed Forces
- Abbreviation: CEMFA
- Reports to: Minister of National Defence
- Appointer: President of Cabo Verde
- Term length: No fixed term
- Constituting instrument: Constitution of Cabo Verde
- Formation: 1975
- Website: Official website

The Chief of Staff of the Armed Forces of Cape Verde (Portuguese: Chefe do Estado-Maior-General das Forças Armadas; CEMFA) is a major-general, who is the highest-ranked officer in the Cape Verdean Armed Forces.

== List of officeholders ==
| No. | Portrait | Name (birth–death) | Term of office | | | Ref. |
| No. | Portrait | Name (birth–death) | Took office | Left office | Time in office | Ref. |
|---|---|---|---|---|---|---|
| 1 | | Brigadier; Marino Dias (1952–2011) | March 1989 | July 1991 | 2 years, 4 months | |
| 2 | | Brigadier; Ederlindo Ribeiro | July 1991 | February 1995 | 3 years, 7 months | |
| 3 | | Brigadier; Amílcar Baptista | February 1995 | October 1998 | 3 years, 8 months | |
| 4 | | Brigadier; Jorge Bettencourt Pinto | October 1998 | May 2001 | 2 years, 7 months | |
| 5 | | Brigadier; Antero Matos | May 2001 | March 2009 | 7 years, 10 months | |
| 6 | | Brigadier; Fernando Pereira Carvalho | March 2009 | 18 August 2011 | 2 years, 5 months | |
| – | | Colonel; Jorge Paulo Monte; Acting | 18 August 2011 | 30 December 2011 | 134 days | |
| 7 | | Major general Alberto Fernandes | 30 December 2011 | 30 April 2016 | 4 years, 122 days | |
| 8 | | Major general Anildo Emanuel da Graça Morais (born 1962) | 24 June 2016 | 3 June 2022 | 5 years, 344 days | |
| 9 | | Counter admiral António Duarte Monteiro (born 1965) | 3 June 2022 | 8 November 2025 | 3 years, 158 days | |
| 10 | | Counter admiral Manuel António Pereira Semedo | 8 November 2025 | Incumbent | 329 days | |
