= First lieutenant =

Military rank

First lieutenant is a commissioned officer military rank in many armed forces; in some forces, it is an appointment.

The rank of lieutenant has different meanings in different military formations, but in most forces it is sub-divided into a senior (first lieutenant) and junior (second lieutenant) rank.

In navies, while certain rank insignia may carry the name lieutenant, the term may also be used to relate to a particular post or duty, rather than a rank.

== Indonesia ==
In Indonesia, "first lieutenant" is known as Letnan Satu (Lettu), Indonesian National Armed Forces uses this rank across all three of its services. It is just above the rank of second lieutenant and just below the rank of captain.

== Israel ==
In the Israel Defense Forces, the rank above second lieutenant is simply lieutenant (Segen). The rank of (קצין מקצועי אקדמאי (קמ"א (katsín miktsoí akademai or "kama"), a professional academic officer (that is, a medical, dental or veterinary officer, a justice officer or a religious officer), is equivalent to a professional officer of the second class in the reserve and equivalent to first lieutenant.

== United Kingdom ==
=== British Army ===
In the British Army and Royal Marines, the rank above second lieutenant is simply lieutenant (pronounced lef-tenant), with no ordinal attached.

Before 1871, when the whole British Army switched to using the current rank of "lieutenant", the Royal Artillery, Royal Engineers and fusilier regiments used "first lieutenant" and "second lieutenant".

=== Royal Navy ===
The first lieutenant (often abbreviated "1st Lt") in a Royal Navy ship is a post or appointment, rather than a rank.

Historically the lieutenants in a ship were ranked in accordance with seniority, with the most senior being termed the first lieutenant and acting as the second-in-command, unless the ship was complemented with a commander. Although lieutenants are no longer ranked by seniority, the post of "first lieutenant" remains. In minor war vessels, destroyers, frigates, and submarines, the first lieutenant is second in command, executive officer (XO) and head of the executive branch; in larger ships where a commander of the warfare specialization is appointed as the executive officer, a first lieutenant is appointed as their deputy. The post of first lieutenant in a shore establishment carries a similar responsibility to the first lieutenant of a capital ship. Colloquial terms in the Royal Navy for the first lieutenant include "number one", "the jimmy" (or "jimmy the one") and "James the First" (a back-formation referring to James I of England). The first lieutenant may hold the rank of sub-lieutenant, lieutenant or lieutenant-commander.

== United States ==
First lieutenant
- U.S. Army, U.S. Marine Corps, U.S. Air Force, and U.S. Space Force insignia of the rank of first lieutenant. Style and method of wear vary between the services.

- Shoulder boards
- Country: United States
- Service branch: U.S. Army; U.S. Marine Corps; U.S. Air Force; U.S. Space Force
- Abbreviation: 1LT (Army); 1stLt (Marine Corps); 1st Lt (Air Force and Space Force)
- Rank group: Company grade officer
- NATO rank code: OF-1
- Pay grade: O-2
- Next higher rank: Captain
- Next lower rank: Second lieutenant
- Equivalent ranks: Lieutenant (junior grade)

=== U.S. Army, U.S. Marine Corps, U.S. Air Force, and U.S. Space Force ===
In the U.S. Army, U.S. Marine Corps, U.S. Air Force, and U.S. Space Force, a first lieutenant is a junior commissioned officer. It is just above the rank of second lieutenant and just below the rank of captain. It is equivalent to the rank of lieutenant (junior grade) in the other uniformed services.

Promotion to first lieutenant is governed by Department of Defense policies derived from the Defense Officer Personnel Management Act of 1980. DOPMA guidelines suggest all "fully qualified" officers should be promoted to first lieutenant. A second lieutenant (grade O-1) is usually promoted to first lieutenant (grade O-2) after 18 months in the Army or 24 months in the Marine Corps and Air & Space Forces. The difference between the two ranks is slight, primarily being experience and a higher pay grade. It is not uncommon to see officers moved to positions requiring more experience after promotion to first lieutenant. For example, in the Army and Marine Corps these positions can include leading a specialty platoon, or assignment as the executive officer for a company-sized unit (70–250 soldiers or marines). In the Air Force, a first lieutenant may be a flight commander or section's officer in charge with varied supervisory responsibilities, including supervision of as many as 100+ personnel, although in a flying unit, a first lieutenant is a rated officer (pilot, navigator, or air battle manager) who has just finished training for his career field and has few supervisory responsibilities.

=== U.S. Navy and U.S. Coast Guard ===
In the U.S. Navy and U.S. Coast Guard, "first lieutenant" is the name of a billet and position title, rather than rank. Officers aboard early sailing ships were the captain and a number of lieutenants. The senior among those lieutenants was known as the first lieutenant, and would have assumed command if the captain were absent or incapacitated. As modern ships have become more complex, requiring specialized knowledge of engineering, communications, and weapons, the "first lieutenant" is the officer in command of the deck department responsible for line handling during mooring and underway replenishment. On smaller ships, the officer of the "first lieutenant" billet holds the rank of lieutenant, junior grade or ensign. On larger vessels, the position of "first lieutenant" is held by a lieutenant or, in the case of extremely large warships such as cruisers or aircraft carriers, the position of "first lieutenant" may be held by a lieutenant commander or even commander. However, on submarines and in aircraft squadrons, where the deck department may only have a few junior sailors, the "first lieutenant" billet may be filled by a first-class petty officer or chief petty officer. What is known in the U.S. Navy as the "first lieutenant division" is usually composed of junior sailors (E-3 and below) who are completing their ninety days of temporary assigned duty, or TAD, that all enlisted personnel are required to perform when initially assigned to a command. The primary mission of the division is servicing, cleaning, organizing and inventorying items within a command.

=== U.S. Revenue Cutter Service ===
The term "first lieutenant" had a dual meaning in the United States Revenue Cutter Service (known until 1894 as the United States Revenue-Marine). The position title of first lieutenant was held by a junior officer who was in charge of deck operations and gunnery. The rank of first lieutenant was the equivalent of lieutenant in the current rank structure of the U.S. Coast Guard, U.S. Navy, United States Public Health Service Commissioned Corps, and National Oceanic and Atmospheric Administration Commissioned Officer Corps. The next senior officer ranking above first lieutenant was captain and the next two lower officer ranks were second and third lieutenant, respectively. When the Revenue Cutter Service merged with the United States Life-Saving Service to form the U.S. Coast Guard in 1915, the rank of first lieutenant carried over into Coast Guard and remained in use until 1918, when the Coast Guard adopted the rank structure of the U.S. Navy.

== Gallery ==
=== Army ===
First lieutenant
(Antigua and Barbuda Regiment)

Teniente primero
(Argentine Army)

First lieutenant
(Australian Army)

Lieutenant
(Belgian Army)

First lieutenant
(Botswana Ground Force)

Primeiro tenente
(Brazilian Army)

Primeiro tenente
(Cape Verdean National Guard)

Primer teniente
(Cuban Revolutionary Army)

Premierløjtnant
(Royal Danish Army)

Primer teniente
(Dominican Army)

Yliluutnantti
Swedish: Premiärlöjtnant
(Finnish Army)

First lieutenant
(Gambian National Army)

Primeiro tenente
(Army of Guinea-Bissau)

Letnan satu
(Indonesian Army)

First lieutenant
(Liberian Ground Forces)

Lieutenant en premier
(Luxembourg Army)

1e Luitenant
(Royal Netherlands Army)

First lieutenant
(New Zealand Army)

Teniente primero
(Nicaraguan Army)

Teniente primero
(Paraguayan Army)

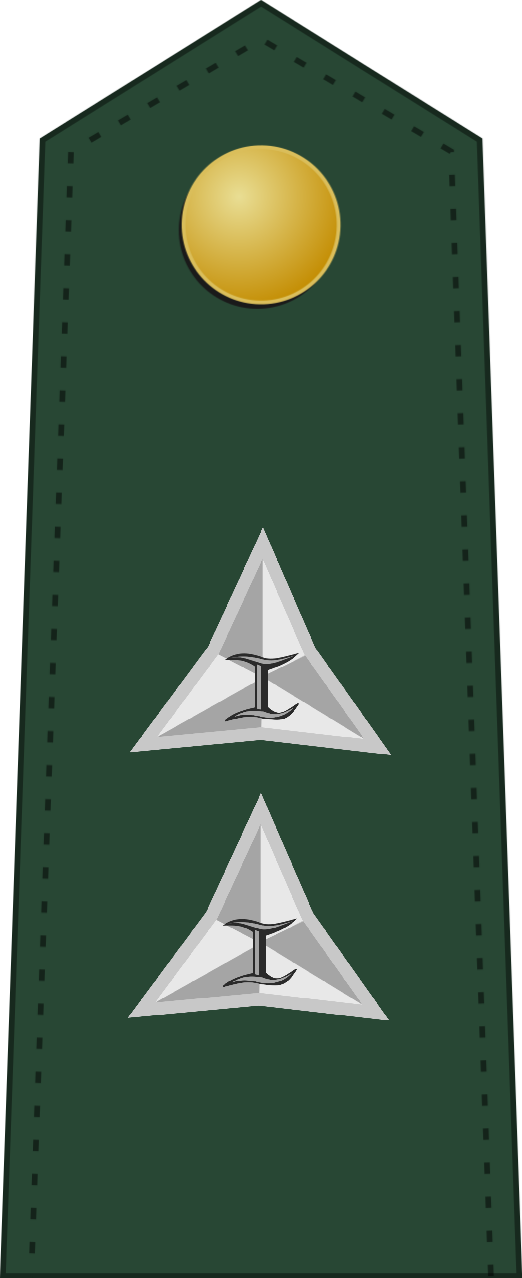
First lieutenant
(Philippine Army)

First lieutenant
(United States Army)

Teniente primero
(National Army of Uruguay)

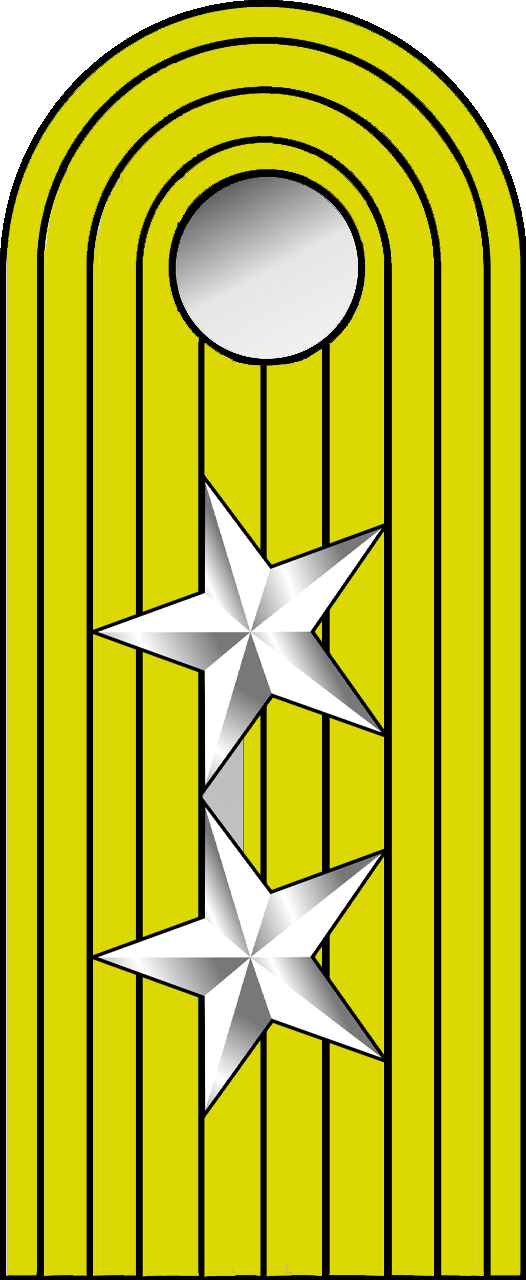
Primer teniente
(Venezuelan Army)

=== Marines ===
First lieutenant
(United States Marine Corps)

=== Navy ===
Primeiro-tenente
(Cape Verdean Coast Guard)

=== Air Force ===
First lieutenant
(Botswana Defence Force Air Wing)

First lieutenant
(United States Air Force)

=== Space Force ===
First lieutenant
United States Space Force

== Notes ==
Citations

References used

- Marine Corps Uniform Regulations, Marine Corps Order P1020.34G with changes 1-5, Chapter 4. Insignia and Regulations for Wear, Sec. 4005. Insignia of Grade, Officers, Para. 2. Description by Grade, h. Captain, i. First Lieutenant, j. Second Lieutenant (p. 4-25) and Figure 4-11. Officers' Grade Insignia (Shoulder/Collar). Washington, DC: United States Marine Corps.
- Barnebey, Matthew (29 June 2011). "1st Lieutenant Division plays significant role in supporting base". Jax Air News. Jacksonville.com website. Archived from the original on 6 May 2014.
- Cipra, Dave (May 1985). "A History of Sea Service Ranks & Titles" (PDF). Commandant's Bulletin. U.S. Coast Guard Historian's Office.
- Cutler, Deborah W. and Thomas J. Cutler (2005). Dictionary of Naval Terms. Naval Institute Press, Annapolis, Maryland. ISBN 978-1-59114-150-1.
- Partridge, Eric (1984). A Dictionary of Slang and Unconventional English (8th ed.). London and New York: Routledge. ISBN 978-0025949805.
