= Damen Stan Patrol 5009 =

Dutch patrol vessel class

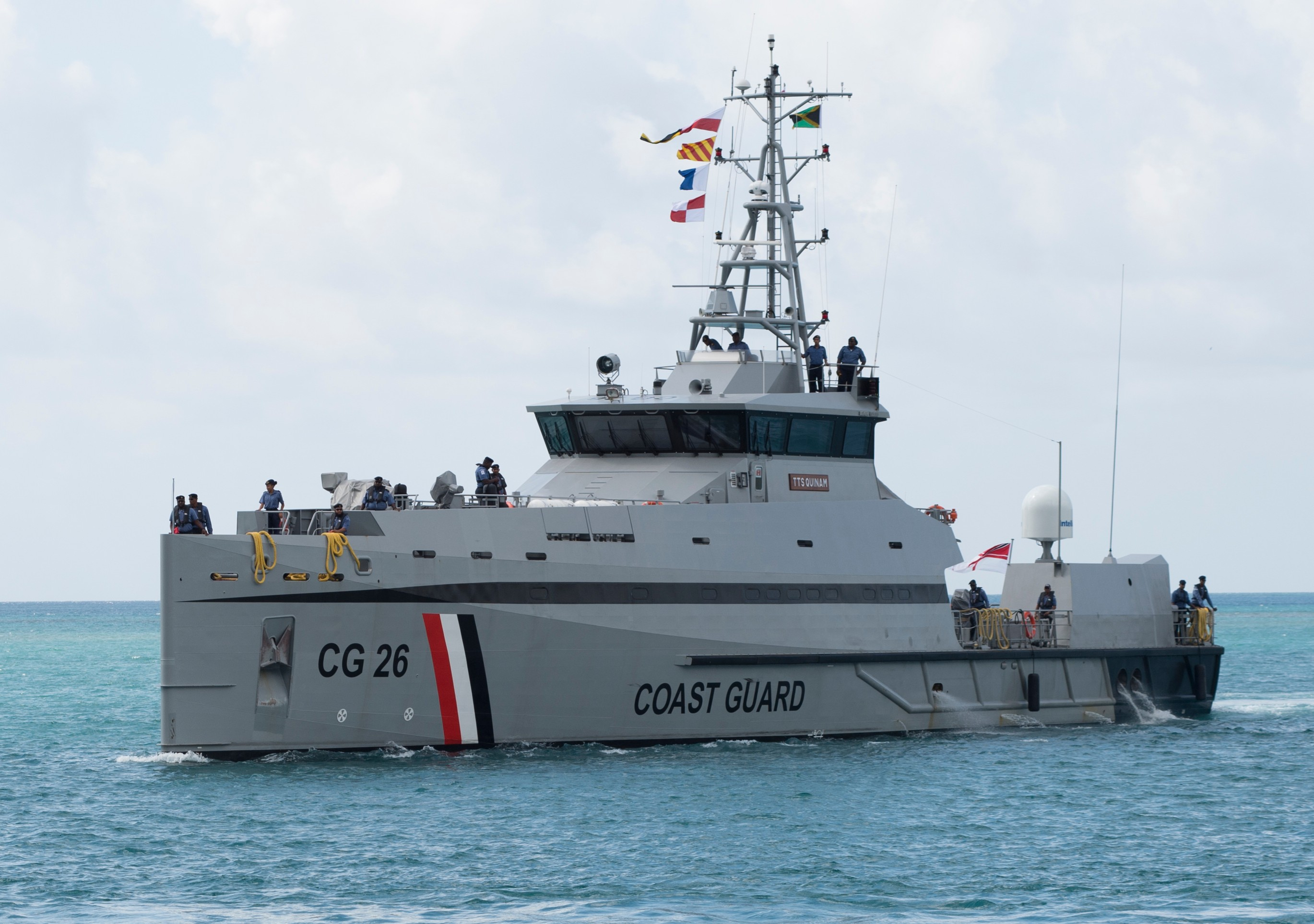
Trinidad and Tobago Ship Quinam arriving in Montego Bay, Jamaica

Damen Group, a Dutch shipbuilding firm, has designed a range of patrol vessels, the Damen Stan Patrol vessels, that includes the Damen Stan Patrol 5009 vessel. Vessels built to the 5009 design are 50 metres long and nine metres wide.

The design is unusual, in having a vertical leading edge to the hull, which Damen calls an "axe bow" - a feature Damen describes as improving habitability in high seas. Vessel of this design have maximum speeds in the 25-35 knot range, and can accommodate crews of approximately 20 to 30 individuals.

Operators of Stan Patrol 5009s include the Cape Verde Coast Guard (2011), the Ecuadorian Coast Guard (2012), the Hellenic Coast Guard (2015), South Africa (2015), Trinidad and Tobago Coast Guard (2016), Somali Police Force (2016), the Jamaica Defence Force Coast Guard (2020) and the United Arab Emirates Coast Guard. The Falkland Islands Government has leased a vessel of the class to fulfill sovereignty and fisheries protection duties around the islands. A ship of the design is also used by the Sea Shepherd Conservation Society.

Damen offers a design for similar vessels intended to be fast crew transport vessels for off-shore drilling platforms.
