= River-class patrol vessel =

Class of offshore patrol vessel for the Royal Navy

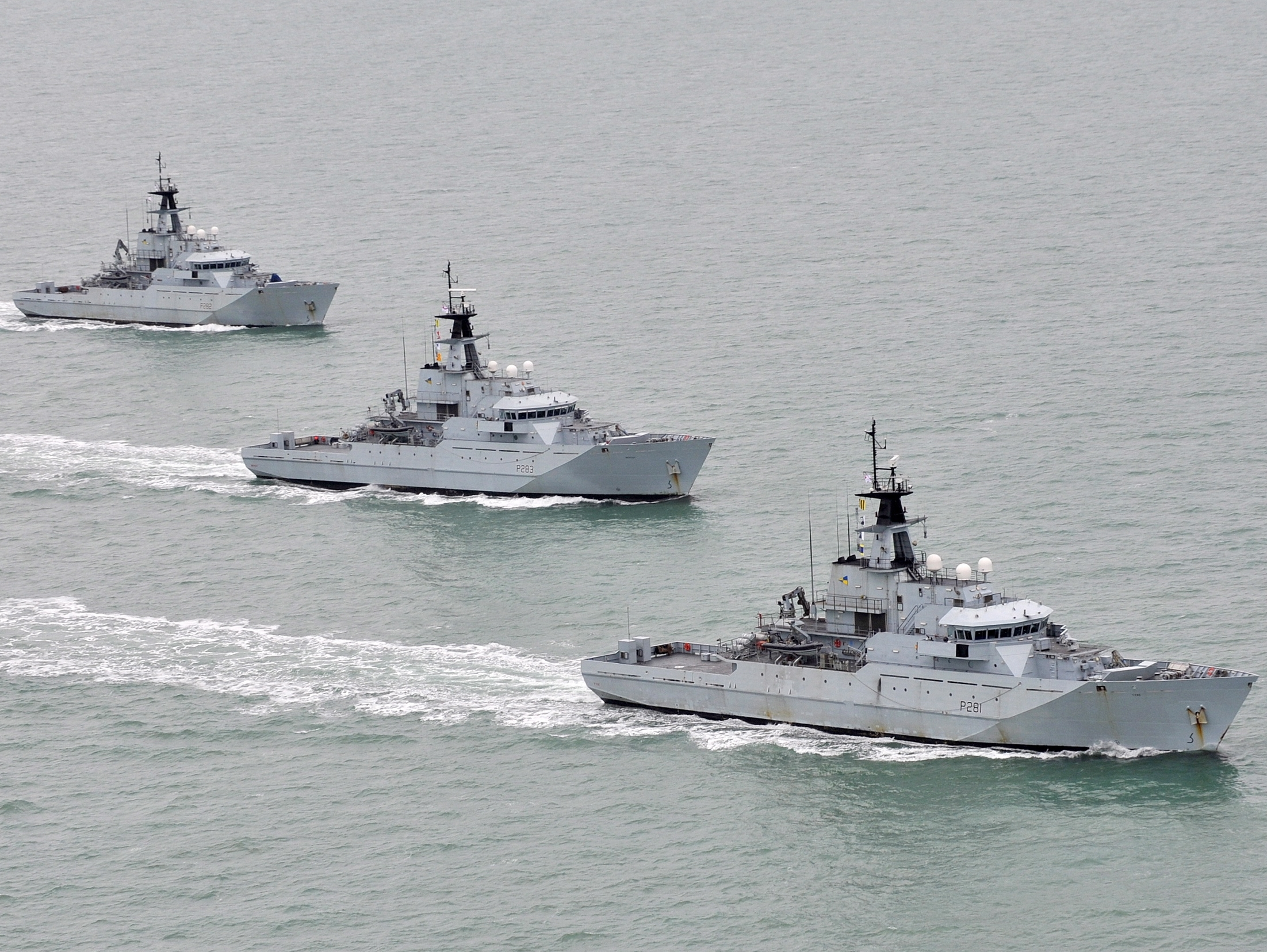
- Batch 1 River-class vessels HMS Severn, HMS Tyne and HMS Mersey exercising off the coast of Cornwall, 2012

Class overview
- Name: River class
- Builders: Batch 1: Vosper Thornycroft (Note: Now BAE Systems Maritime – Naval Ships.); Batch 2: BAE Systems Maritime – Naval Ships
- Operators: Royal Navy; Brazilian Navy; Royal Thai Navy; Royal Bahrain Naval Force
- Preceded by: Castle class
- Subclasses: Krabi-class patrol vessel; Amazonas-class corvette
- Built: 2001–present
- In commission: 2003–present
- Planned: 14
- Completed: 14
- Active: 8 (Royal Navy); 3 (Brazilian Navy); 2 (Royal Thai Navy); 1 (Royal Bahrain Naval Force)

General characteristics
- Type: Offshore patrol vessel
- Displacement: Batch 1: 1,700 t (1,700 long tons); Batch 2: 2,000 t (2,000 long tons)
- Length: Batch 1: 79.5 m (260 ft 10 in); Batch 2: 90.5 m (296 ft 11 in)
- Beam: Batch 1: 13.5 m (44 ft 3 in); Batch 2: 13.5 m (44 ft 3 in)
- Draught: Batch 1: 3.8 m (12 ft 6 in); Batch 2: 4.6 m (15 ft 1 in)
- Propulsion: Batch 1: 2 × Ruston 12R270 diesel engines, 8,250 kW (11,060 hp), 2 shafts; 2 × controllable-pitch propellers; Batch 2: 2 × MAN 16V28/33D diesel engines, 14,700 kW (19,700 hp), 2 shafts; 2 × controllable-pitch propellers
- Speed: Batch 1: 20 knots (37 km/h; 23 mph); Batch 2: 25 knots (46 km/h; 29 mph)
- Range: Batch 1 & 2: 5,500 nmi (10,200 km; 6,300 mi)
- Endurance: Batch 1: 21 days; Batch 2: 35 days
- Boats & landing craft carried: Two Pacific 24 RIBs; Batch 2: Small Unmanned underwater vehicles may be embarked for mine countermeasures
- Troops: Batch 1: c. 18; Batch 2: up to 50
- Complement: Batch 1: 28-30; Batch 2: 34-50
- Sensors & processing systems: Batch 2: Kelvin Hughes Ltd SharpEye navigation radar; Terma Scanter 4100 2D radar; BAE CMS-1; Shared Infrastructure operating system
- Armament: Batch 1: 1 × Oerlikon 20 mm cannon; 2 × General purpose machine guns; Batch 2: 1 × Bushmaster 30 mm cannon; 2 × Miniguns (replaced by Browning .50 caliber heavy machine guns as of 2023); 2 × general purpose machine guns
- Aviation facilities: Batch 2: Merlin-capable flight deck; small UAVs may be embarked
- Notes: Batch 1: 25-tonne crane; Batch 2: 16-tonne crane

The River class is a class of offshore patrol vessels built primarily for the Royal Navy of the United Kingdom. A total of nine were built for the Royal Navy (RN), four Batch 1 and five Batch 2. One Batch 1 (HMS Clyde), which was the Falklands guard ship, was decommissioned and transferred at the end of its lease to the Royal Bahrain Naval Force.

The three remaining Batch 1 ships perform fisheries security and border patrol tasks in UK waters. The five new Batch 2 ships provide overseas forward presence, performing maritime security duties and disaster relief operations, on occasion supported by a Royal Fleet Auxiliary vessel.

The Batch 1 ships of the class replaced the seven ships of the Island class and the two Castle-class patrol vessels.

HTMS Krabi was the first of two ships adapting the River design for the Royal Thai Navy and built in Thailand. The three ships of the Amazonas-class offshore patrol vessel in service with the Brazilian Navy were developed from the Batch 1 River-class design, and the Royal Navy's Batch 2 ships were in turn based upon the Amazonas design.

== Royal Navy ==
=== Batch 1 ===
==== Tyne, Severn and Mersey ====
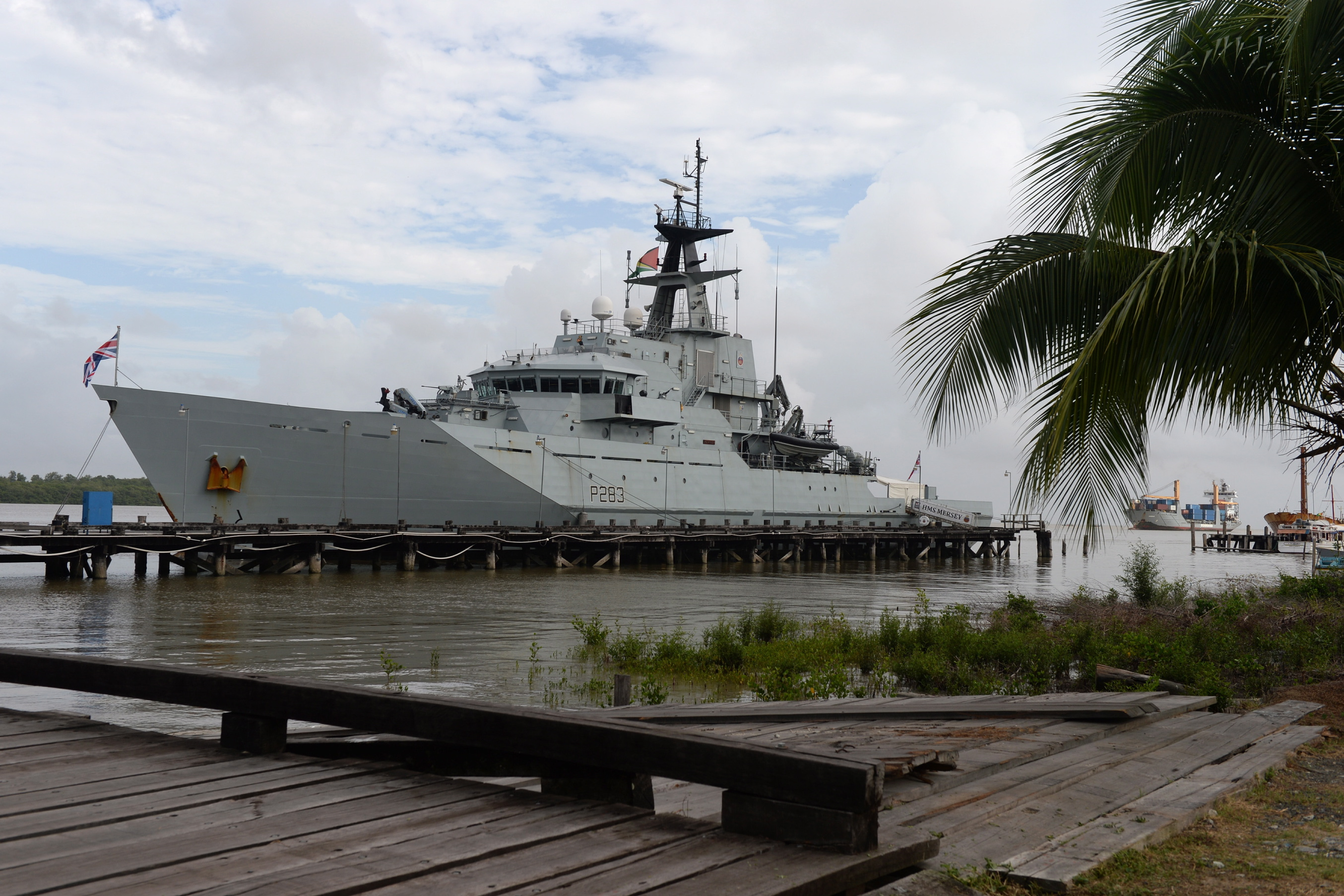
Mersey visits Guyana during her Caribbean deployment in 2016

In early 2001, the Ministry of Defence placed an order with Vosper Thornycroft (VT) for three River-class offshore patrol vessels to replace the Island class. It was understood that the higher availability rates of the River class (up to 300 days per year) would enable the three new ships to perform the duties of the five ships they replaced. The Royal Navy initially leased the ships from VT under a five-year, £60 million contract. As part of the contract, VT would be responsible for all maintenance and support during the charter period. This contract was renewed in January 2007 for another five years at £52 million. However, in September 2012, instead of renewing the contract again, it was announced by the then Defence Secretary Philip Hammond that the Ministry of Defence had purchased the vessels for £39 million.

The River-class vessels are significantly larger than the Island-class vessels and have a large open deck aft, allowing them to be fitted with equipment for a specific role, which can include fire-fighting, disaster relief and anti-pollution work. For this purpose, a 25-tonne (25-long-ton; 28-short-ton) capacity crane is fitted. In addition, the deck is strong enough for the transport of various tracked and wheeled light vehicles, or an LCVP. The class are primarily used with the Fishery Protection Squadron and EEZ patrol. In 2009, the average running costs for the River class were reported in Parliament at an estimated £20 million: "These figures, based on the expenditure incurred by the Ministry of Defence in 2009–10, include maintenance, safety certification, military upgrades, manpower, inventory, satellite communication, fuel costs and depreciation."

On 24 April 2017, in a written answer to a question raised by Sir Nicholas Soames, Parliamentary Under-Secretary for Defence Harriett Baldwin stated Severn would be decommissioned in 2017, with Mersey and Clyde following in 2019. Severn was decommissioned in a ceremony at Portsmouth on 27 October 2017, with Tyne due to follow in May 2018; however, the latter was brought back into service due to defects with Forth.

In March 2018, Baldwin's successor as Parliamentary Under-Secretary for Defence, Guto Bebb, announced that £12.7m had been allocated from the "EU Exit Preparedness Fund" to maintain the three Batch 1 ships to control and enforce UK waters and fisheries following the United Kingdom's withdrawal from the European Union. On 22 November 2018, the Defence Secretary, Gavin Williamson, formally announced that the first three Batch 1 River-class ships would be retained in service.

HMS Tyne, Mersey and Severn are now part of the Offshore Division of the Coastal Forces Squadron (the renamed 1st Patrol Boat Squadron).

The United Kingdom has formally offered to sell the three River-class Batch 1 OPVs to the Uruguayan Navy. This proposal, submitted through the British Embassy in late March 2026, serves as a solution to Uruguay's urgent need for ocean-going patrol capabilities following the cancellation of a prior contract with a Spanish shipyard.

==== Clyde ====
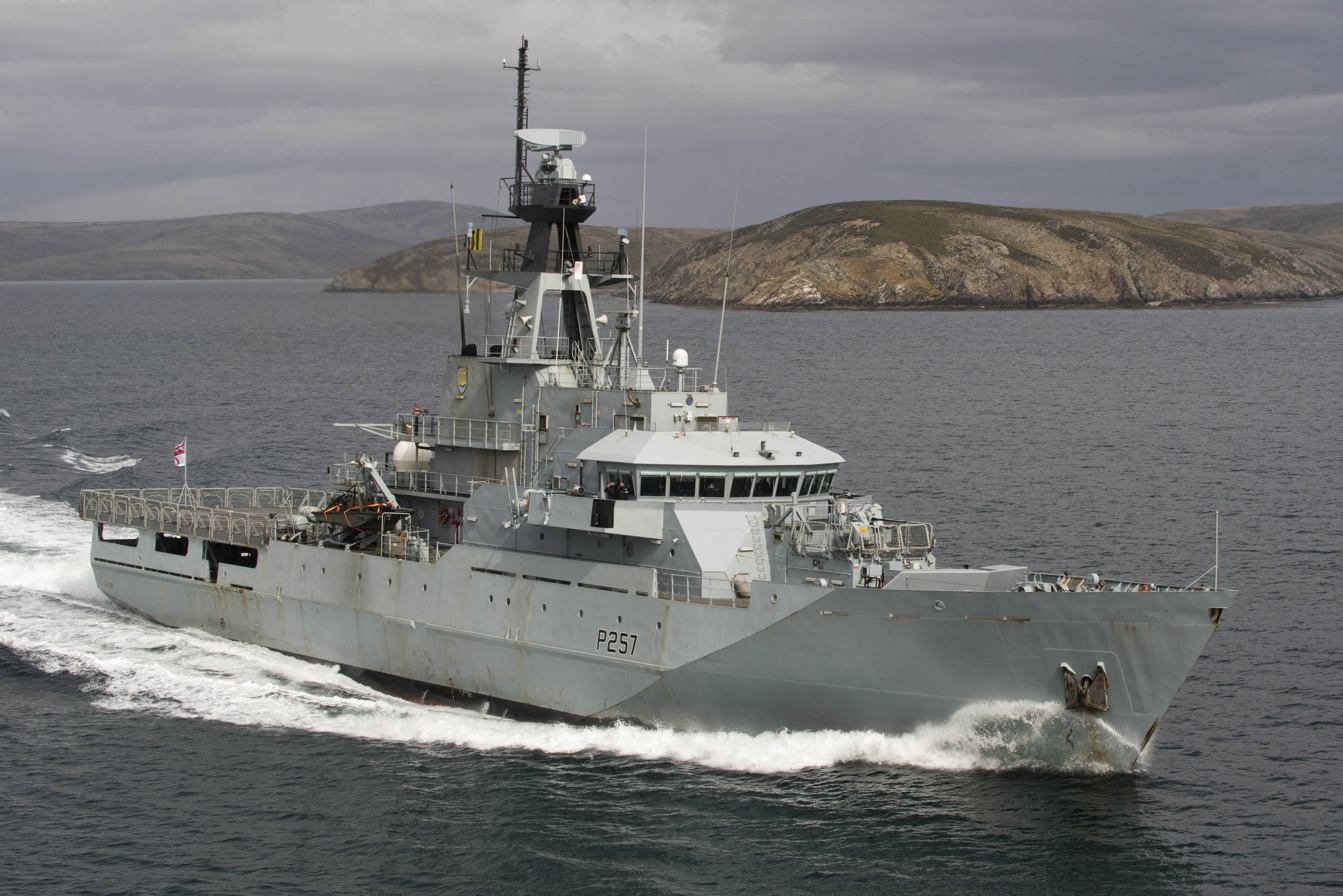
HMS Clyde exercising off the Falklands in 2014

In February 2005, the Ministry of Defence placed an order with VT for the charter of a fourth modified River-class offshore patrol vessel. This fourth ship, HMS Clyde (P257), was constructed at Portsmouth Dockyard and replaced the two Castle-class patrol vessels for duties around the South Atlantic and the Falkland Islands. To fulfil this role, Clyde incorporates several modifications, including an extended length 81.5 m (267 ft 5 in) hull, a top speed of 21 knots (39 km/h; 24 mph), a 30 mm cannon, two miniguns and mountings for five general purpose machine guns. Clyde's elongated hull permits a 20-metre (66 ft) strengthened flight deck able to accommodate an AgustaWestland AW101 Merlin-sized helicopter. The ship has a full load displacement between 1,850 and 2,000 tonnes. Clyde was capable of temporarily embarking up to 110 troops and their equipment and inserting them anywhere on the Falkland Islands. Clyde had a complement of 36. Clyde was decommissioned on 20 December 2019.

Clyde was not owned by the Royal Navy, but had instead been leased via a PFI public–private partnership deal with BAE Systems. While the other three were purchased outright by the M.O.D, on 7 August 2020 it was announced in a ceremony held at the HMNB Portsmouth Naval Base that Clyde had been transferred to the Royal Bahrain Naval Force, with the ship renamed as Al-Zubara.

=== Batch 2 ===
==== Forth, Medway, Trent ====
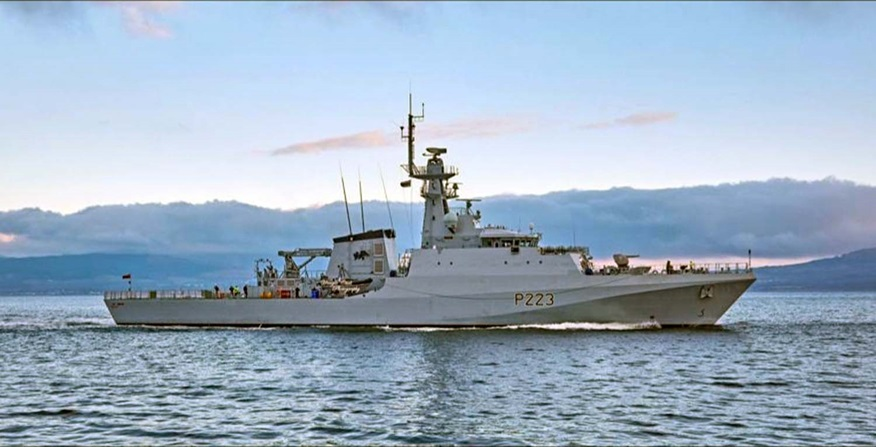
Medway during sea trials in 2018

On 6 November 2013, it was announced that the British Government had signed an Agreement in Principle to build three new offshore patrol vessels, based on the River-class design, at a fixed price of £348 million, including spares and support for the Royal Navy. In August 2014, BAE Systems signed the contract to build the ships at their BAE Systems Maritime – Naval Ships shipyards in Glasgow on the River Clyde. The Ministry of Defence stated that the Batch 2 ships are capable of being used for constabulary duties such as "counter-terrorism, counter-piracy and anti-smuggling operations". According to BAE Systems, the vessels are designed to be deployed globally, conducting anti-piracy, counter-terrorism and anti-smuggling tasks currently conducted by frigates and destroyers. Steel was cut on 10 October 2014 and the class started entering service from 2017, with the last being delivered in August 2020. The ships are built at the BAE Systems Govan shipyard, then transferred to the BAE Systems Scotstoun shipyard for fitting out.

The Batch 2 ships are fundamentally different in appearance and capabilities from the preceding Batch 1. Notable differences include the 90.5 metres (296 ft 11 in) long hull, a top speed of 25 knots (46 km/h; 29 mph), a flight deck that can take an AgustaWestland Merlin helicopter, a displacement of around 2,000 tonnes and greatly expanded capacity for accommodating troops. The Batch 2 ships also have a different (full-width) superstructure, and a fundamentally different above-water hullform shape (greater bow flare, different and less-pronounced forward knuckle line compared to the Batch 1 ships, lack of the distinctive forward and aft bulwarks of the Batch 1 vessels). The class is also fitted with the Kelvin Hughes SharpEye integrated radar system for navigation, the Terma Scanter 4100 2D radar for air and surface surveillance, and a BAE CMS-1 "Combat Management System".

Batch 2 are also the first Royal Navy ships fitted with the BAE Systems Shared Infrastructure operating system. BAE describes Shared Infrastructure as "a state-of-the-art system that will revolutionise the way ships operate by using virtual technologies to host and integrate the sensors, weapons and management systems that complex warships require. Replacing multiple large consoles dedicated to specific tasks with a single hardware solution reduces the number of spares required to be carried onboard and will significantly decrease through-life costs."

The class has been criticised in evidence to the Commons Defence Select Committee: lacking a helicopter hangar, something that will limit usefulness of the helicopter deck by preventing embarkation of a helicopter for anything other than very short periods; lacking a medium calibre gun (such as 76 mm); and poor value for money. It is argued that because of the lack of these features - which could have been incorporated for the price - the vessels will not be as capable in the ocean-going patrol capacity as claimed. A criticism of the class is that the reasoning behind their commissioning was simply to ensure that public money continued to support BAE dockyards and jobs prior to the ordering of the Type 26 frigate.

The Batch 2 ships for the Royal Navy include some 29 modifications and enhancements over the Amazonas-class corvette built by BAE Systems for the Brazilian Navy. The Royal Navy ships are built to more stringent naval standards, with features such as magazine protection, improved hull integrity and fire safety modifications, as well as greater redundancy.

The first, HMS Forth, was christened at a ceremony at the BAE Systems Scotstoun shipyard in Glasgow on 9 March 2017. Forth replaced HMS Clyde as the Falkland Islands guardship in December 2019, though she returned to the U.K. in early 2026 being replaced by HMS Medway.

All Batch 2 ships are designed to fulfil forward presence tasks, permanently stationed overseas with rotating crews, releasing the Type 23 frigates which previously filled the roles for other duties. HMS Medway was commissioned in September 2019, and in January 2020 deployed as the long-term Atlantic Patrol Task (North) ship in the Caribbean. Subsequently, she also served in the Falkland Islands.

HMS Trent was commissioned in August 2020 and immediately deployed to the Mediterranean on anti-people smuggling tasks. The 2021 defence white paper announced that she would henceforth be permanently based in Gibraltar for operations in the Mediterranean and in the Gulf of Guinea, though by 2025 her taskings there had become less frequent.

==== Tamar and Spey ====
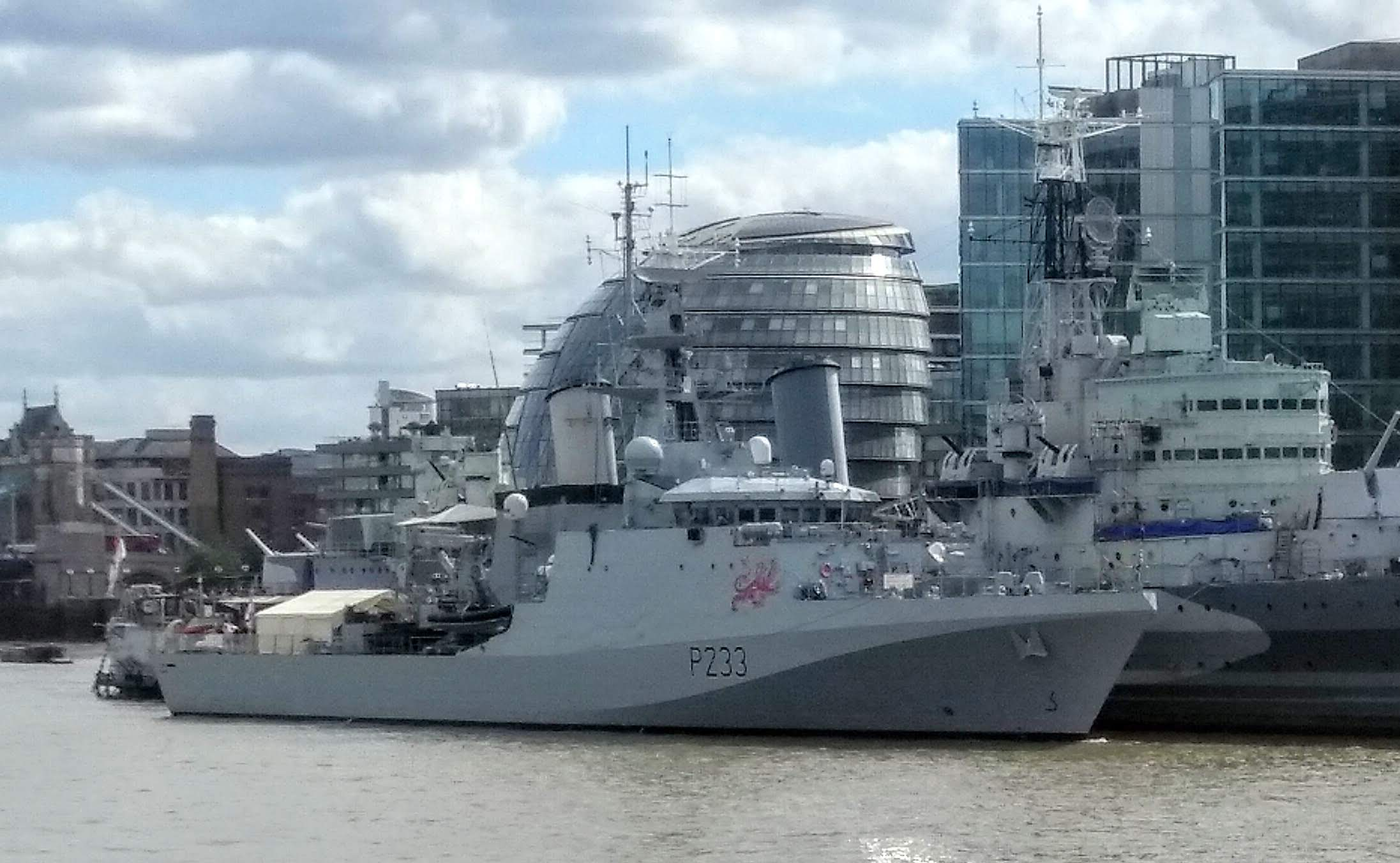
Tamar during a port visit to London in 2020

The Strategic Defence and Security Review 2015 announced a further purchase of two Batch 2 ships at an undisclosed date in the future. Expectations at the time were that this would encompass the three Batch 2 ships announced in 2013, the two additional Batch 2 ships announced in the 2015 defence review, and the modified Batch 1 ship, Clyde. The three Batch 1 ships without flight decks would be withdrawn in favour of the newer ships. The defence review suggested that the ships could be used to increase the Royal Navy's ability to defend UK interests at home and abroad.

During a Defence Select Committee in July 2016, the First Sea Lord Admiral Sir Philip Jones indicated that the option for a fleet of "up to six" offshore patrol vessels had been reduced to five, with Clyde being replaced by HMS Forth, a new Batch 2 ship. The First Sea Lord also elaborated on the potential uses for the Batch 2 ships overseas, including the possibility of basing an extra ship at the Falklands Islands, or forward basing it elsewhere.

A £287m order for the two new ships, and support for all five Batch 2 ships, was announced on 8 December 2016. HM Ships Tamar and Spey would join the fleet in 2020 and 2021 respectively, both fulfilling overseas Forward Presence roles and releasing Type 23 frigates for roles more suited to a higher-capability warship.

On 21 April 2017, with construction of HMS Tamar already under way, the first steel was cut for HMS Spey. Like their predecessors, the ships were constructed at the BAE Systems Govan shipyard, then transferred to the Scotstoun shipyard for fitting out.

Tamar arrived at her home port of Portsmouth for the first time on 2 April 2020, joining HMS Trent. She would spend the rest of the year training before commissioning and deploying. HMS Spey began contractor sea trials in September 2020, arriving in her home port of Portsmouth for the first time on 30 October 2020. HMS Spey was commissioned into the Royal Navy in Portsmouth on 18 June 2021.

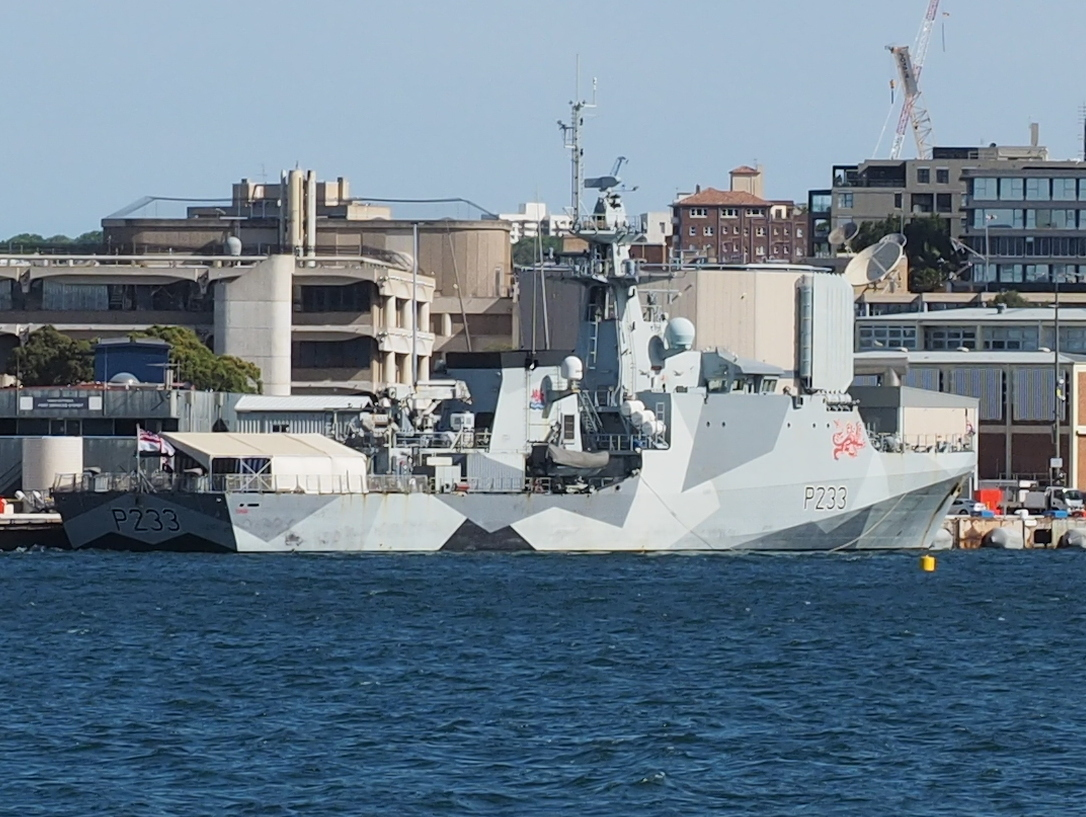
HMS Tamar at Fleet Base East, Sydney, in 2023, showing the dazzle camouflage that all the Batch 2 ships have received.

According to Forbes, in an emergency the Royal Navy might have to attach anti-ship missiles to its Batch 2 River-class patrol ships to make up for its lack of surface warfare frigates and destroyers, and additional upgrades could include attaching a Bofors 57 mm gun. However, no such weapons fit had yet been authorised for the River-class ships. In May 2021, Tamar was repainted with a dazzle camouflage scheme, for heritage rather than operational reasons; the other Batch 2 ships were similarly treated, the last being Trent in February 2025.

On 7 September 2021, both HMS Spey and HMS Tamar left Portsmouth to be forward deployed to the Indo-Pacific region. It is anticipated that they will not return for a minimum of five years and could stay in the region for up to 10 years.

== Foreign orders ==
=== Brazilian Navy ===
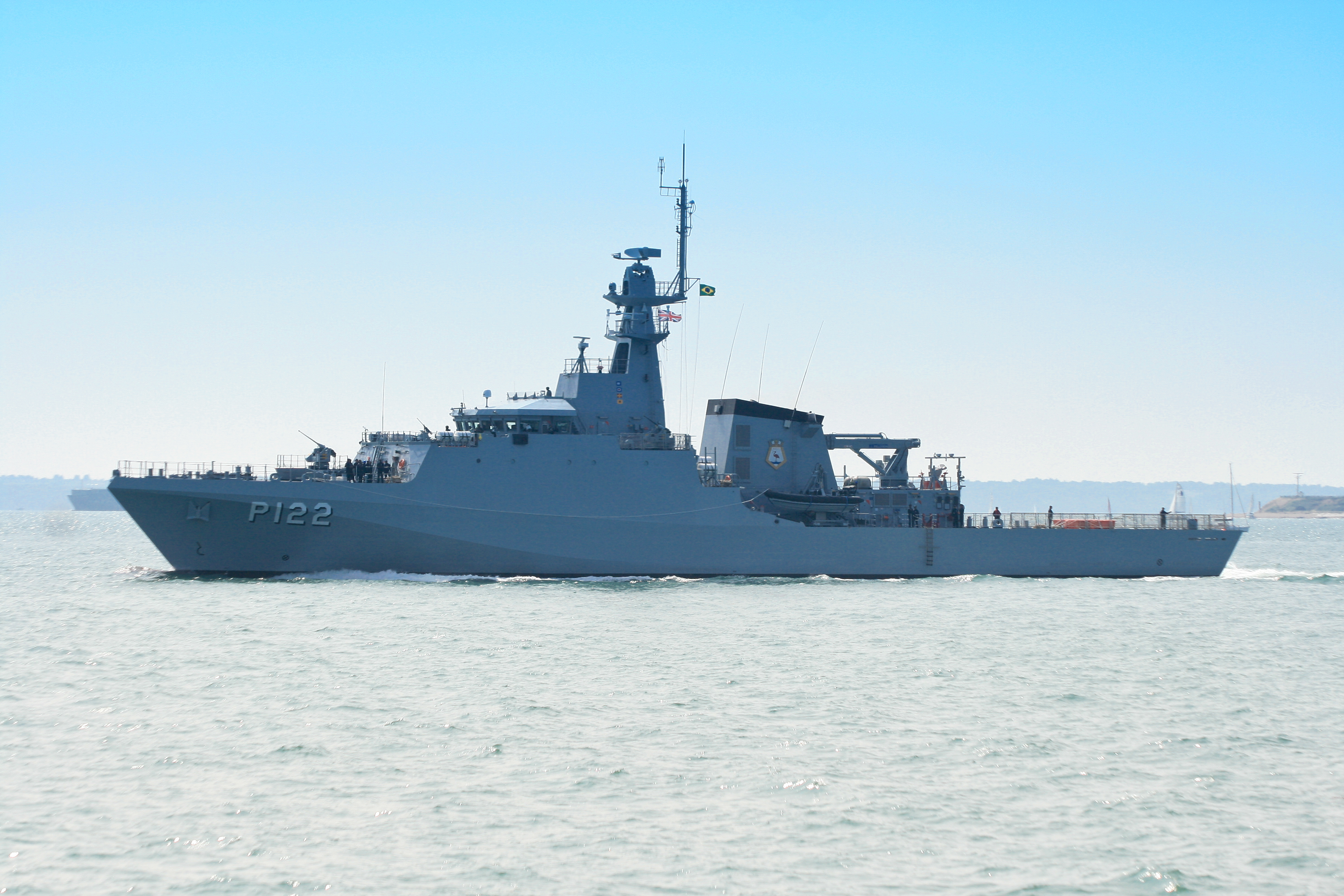
BNS Araguari in service with the Brazilian Navy

Three vessels of the Amazonas-class offshore patrol vessel based on the River class were built by BAE in the United Kingdom. They were originally intended to be exported for use by the Trinidad and Tobago Defence Force; however, the Government of the Republic of Trinidad and Tobago cancelled the order in September 2010. In December 2011 it was reported that the Brazilian Navy were interested in buying the vessels, and possibly up to five additional vessels of the same design. The sale, for £133 million (compared to an original £150m), was then confirmed on 2 January 2012.

=== Royal Thai Navy ===
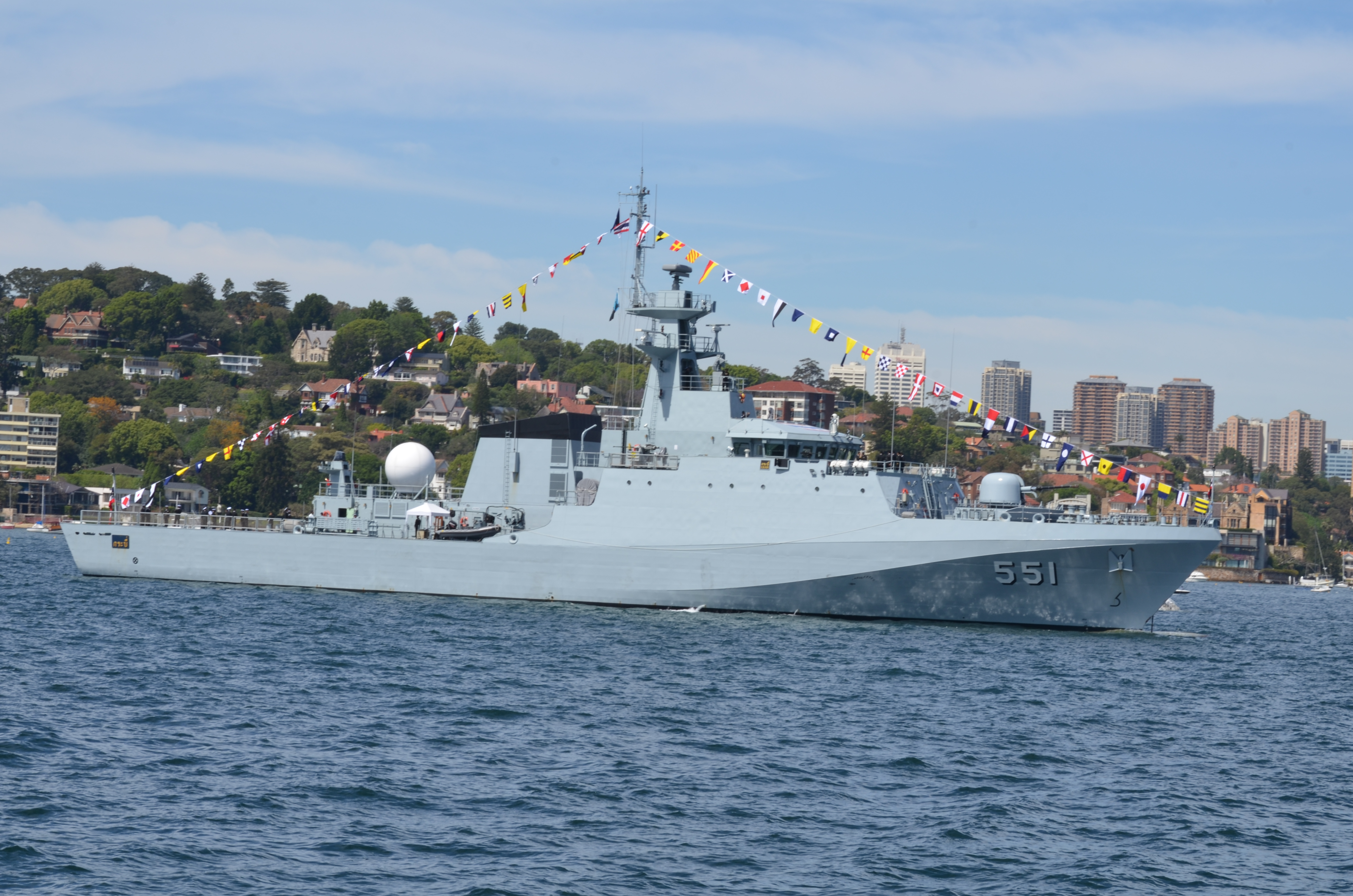
HTMS Krabi in service with the Royal Thai Navy

HTMS Krabi was the first modified River-class vessel built for the Royal Thai Navy. The ship was built in Thailand but with design, technology transfer and support provided by BAE Systems. In January 2016 it was announced that a contract had been signed to provide the Royal Thai Navy with a second ship based on the River-class OPV to be built under licence at Bangkok Dock Company. This second Thai-built ship, HTMS Prachuap Khiri Khan was launched in August 2019 fitted with four RGM-84 Harpoon anti-ship missiles not present on Krabi. The new vessel was commissioned less than two months later.

== List of vessels ==
Name	Pennant No.	Builder	Launched	Commissioned	Decommissioned	Recommissioned	Status
River-class patrol vessel (Royal Navy)
Batch 1
Tyne	P281	VT Shipbuilding, Southampton	27 April 2002	4 July 2003			In active service Portsmouth.
Severn	P282	VT Shipbuilding, Southampton	4 December 2002	31 July 2003	27 October 2017	28 August 2021 (active from June 2020)	In active service English Channel.
Mersey	P283	VT Shipbuilding, Southampton	14 June 2003	28 November 2003			Refitting in Falmouth.
Modified Batch 1
Clyde	P257	VT Shipbuilding, Portsmouth	14 June 2006	30 January 2007	20 December 2019		Transferred to Royal Bahrain Naval Force as Al-Zubara
Batch 2
Forth	P222	BAE Systems, Glasgow	20 August 2016	13 April 2018			In active service
Medway	P223	BAE Systems, Glasgow	23 August 2017	19 September 2019			In active service; serves as the Falkland Islands patrol vessel as of early 2026
Trent	P224	BAE Systems, Glasgow	20 March 2018	3 August 2020			In active service
Tamar	P233	BAE Systems, Glasgow	10 October 2018	17 December 2020			In active service; deployed to the Indo-Pacific region.
Spey	P234	BAE Systems, Glasgow	19 June 2019	18 June 2021			In active service; deployed to the Indo-Pacific region.
River-class patrol vessel Modified Batch 1 (Royal Bahrain Naval Force)
Al-Zubara	80	VT Shipbuilding, Portsmouth	14 June 2006	7 August 2020			In active service ex-HMS Clyde
Amazonas-class patrol vessel (Brazilian Navy)
Amazonas	P120	BAE Systems, Portsmouth	18 November 2009	29 June 2012			In active service
Apa	P121	BAE Systems, Scotstoun	15 July 2010	30 November 2012			In active service
Araguari	P122	BAE Systems, Scotstoun	16 July 2010	21 June 2013			In active service
Krabi-class patrol vessel (Royal Thai Navy)
Krabi	551	Bangkok Dock Company	3 December 2011	26 August 2013			In active service
Prachuap Khiri Khan	552	Bangkok Dock Company	2 August 2019	27 September 2019			In active service

== See also ==
- List of naval ship classes in service
