= Brazilian ship Araguari =

At least two ships of the Brazilian Navy have borne the name Araguari

- Brazilian destroyer Araguari, an Acre-class destroyer launched in 1946 and stricken in 1974
- Brazilian corvette Araguari, an Amazonas-class corvette launched in 2010 as San Fernando for the Trinidad and Tobago Coastguard she was acquired by Brazil in 2012
