= Brazilian ship Apa =

At least two ships of the Brazilian Navy have borne the name Apa

- Brazilian destroyer Apa, an Acre-class destroyer launched in 1945 and stricken in 1964
- Brazilian corvette Apa, an Amazonas-class corvette launched in 2010 as Scarborough for the Trinidad and Tobago Coastguard she was acquired by Brazil in 2012
