= Brazilian offshore patrol vessel Amazonas =

Amazonas-class offshore patrol vessel of Brazilian Navy

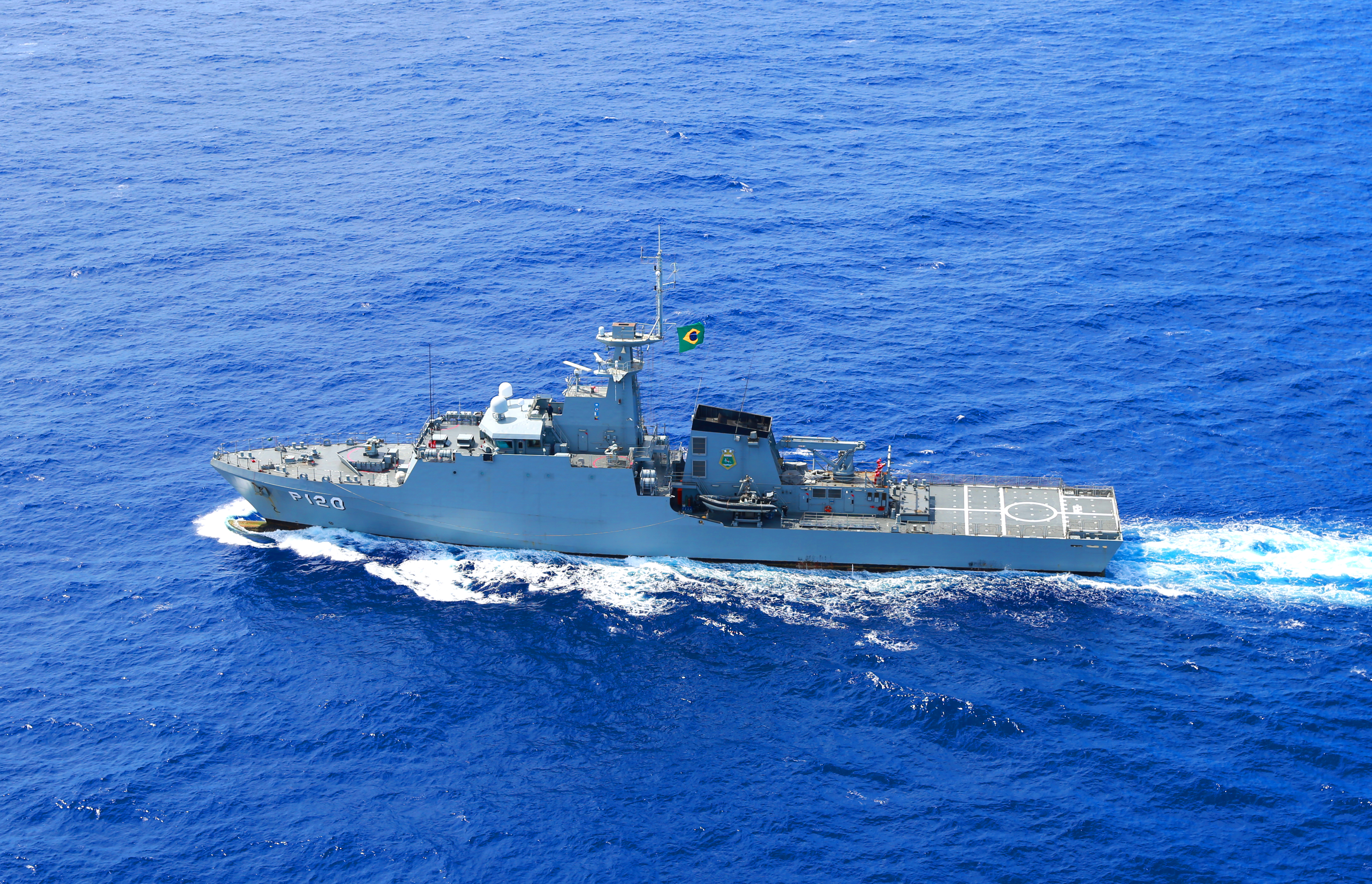
- Amazonas

History

Brazil
- Name: Amazonas
- Namesake: Amazonas River
- Builder: BAE Systems, Portsmouth
- Launched: 18 November 2009
- Commissioned: 29 June 2012
- Renamed: from Port of Spain
- Home port: Rio de Janeiro
- Identification: IMO number: 9526394; MMSI number: 710493000; Callsign: PWAZ; Pennant number: P-120
- Status: Active
- Badge

General characteristics
- Type: Amazonas-class offshore patrol vessel
- Displacement: 2,000 t (2,000 long tons; 2,200 short tons)
- Length: 90.5 m (296 ft 11 in)
- Beam: 13.5 m (44 ft 3 in)
- Propulsion: 2 × MAN 16V28/33D diesel engines, 14,700 kW (19,713 hp), 2 shafts; 2 × controllable-pitch propellers
- Speed: 25 knots (46 km/h; 29 mph)
- Range: 5,500 nmi (10,200 km)
- Endurance: 35 days
- Complement: 80
- Sensors & processing systems: Terma Scanter 4100, X-band; Ultra Electronics OSIRIS CMS
- Armament: 1 × 30 mm DS30M cannon; 2 × 25 mm guns; 2 × 12.7 mm machine guns
- Aviation facilities: 20 m (66 ft) flight deck

Amazonas (P120) is a Amazonas-class offshore patrol vessel currently operated by the Brazilian Navy. She was originally named Port of Spain (CG50) while she was being built for the Trinidad and Tobago Coast Guard.

== Background ==
The Amazonas class were originally named as the Port of Spain class and built for the Trinidad and Tobago Coast Guard. Then, despite two of the vessels having been completed at the time and awaiting delivery, and with crew training ongoing in the United Kingdom, the Government of the Republic of Trinidad and Tobago (GORTT) cancelled the order in September 2010.

In December 2011 it was reported that the Brazilian Navy were interested in buying the vessels, and possibly up to five additional vessels of the same design.

== Construction and career ==
Port of Spain was built by BAE Systems Maritime in Portsmouth and launched on 18 November 2009. The ship was sold to the Brazilian Navy and renamed Amazonas (P-120). She was commissioned on 29 June 2012.

== Gallery ==
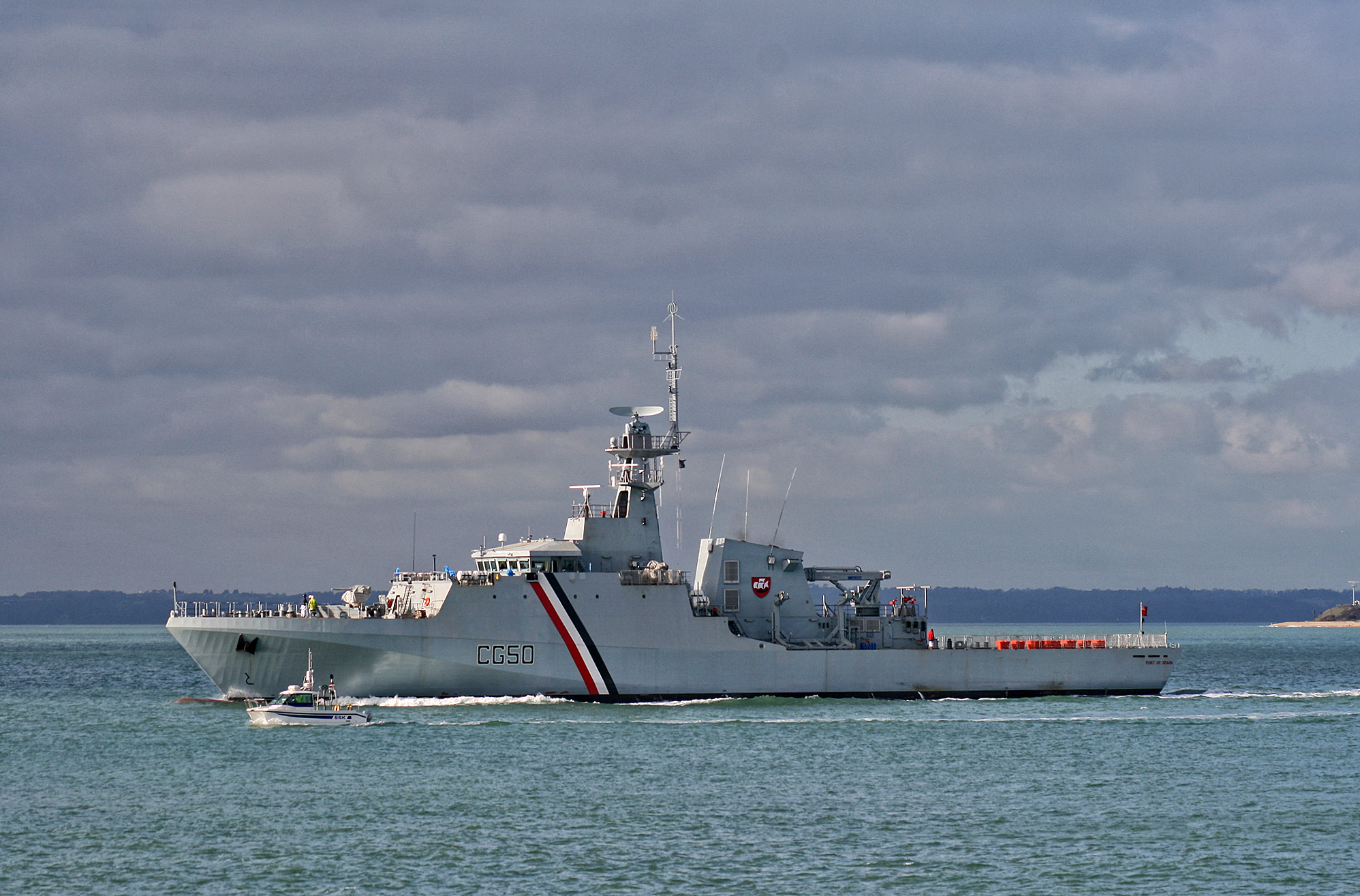
Port of Spain on 13 February 2010.

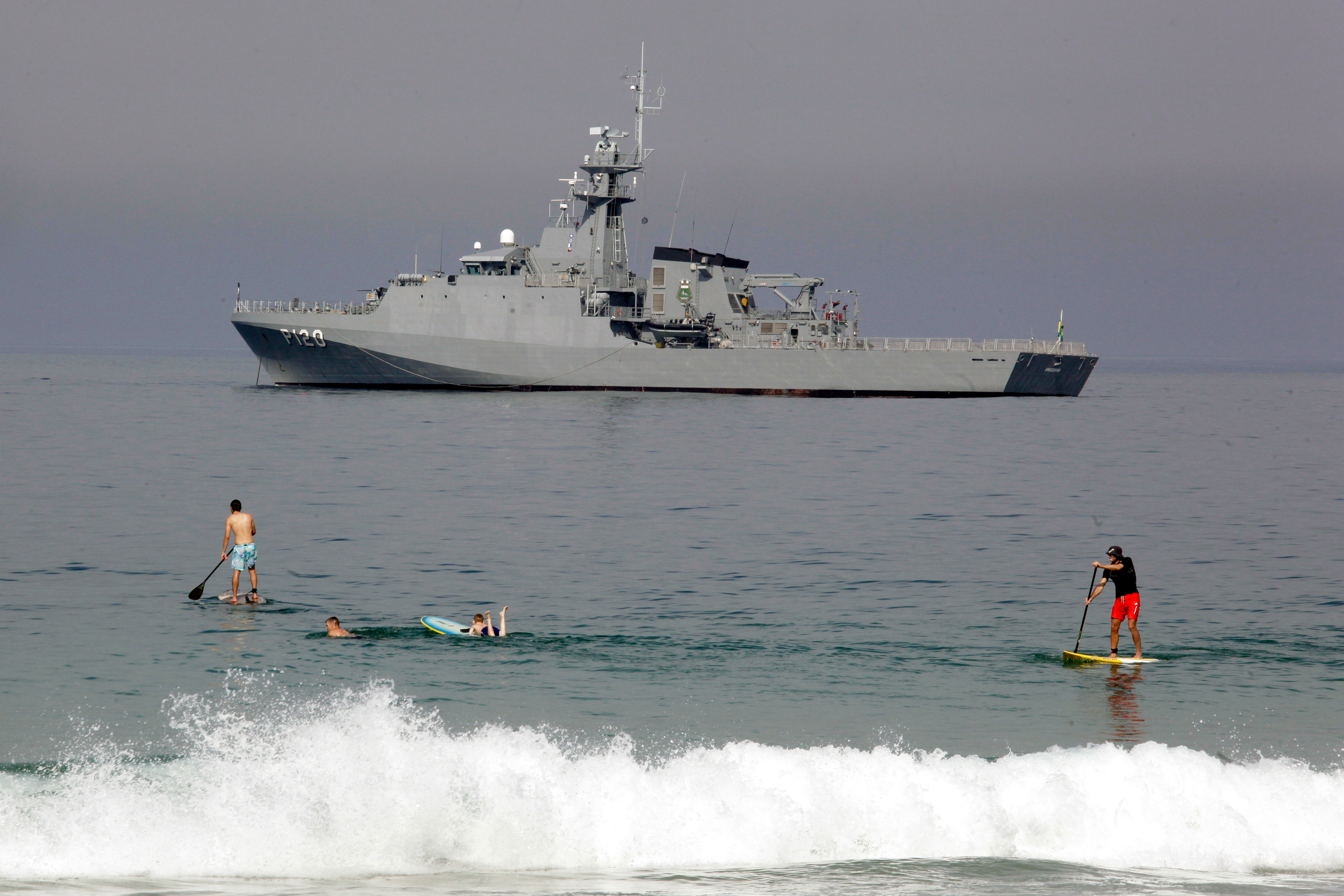
Amazonas off Rio de Janeiro on 9 June 2014.

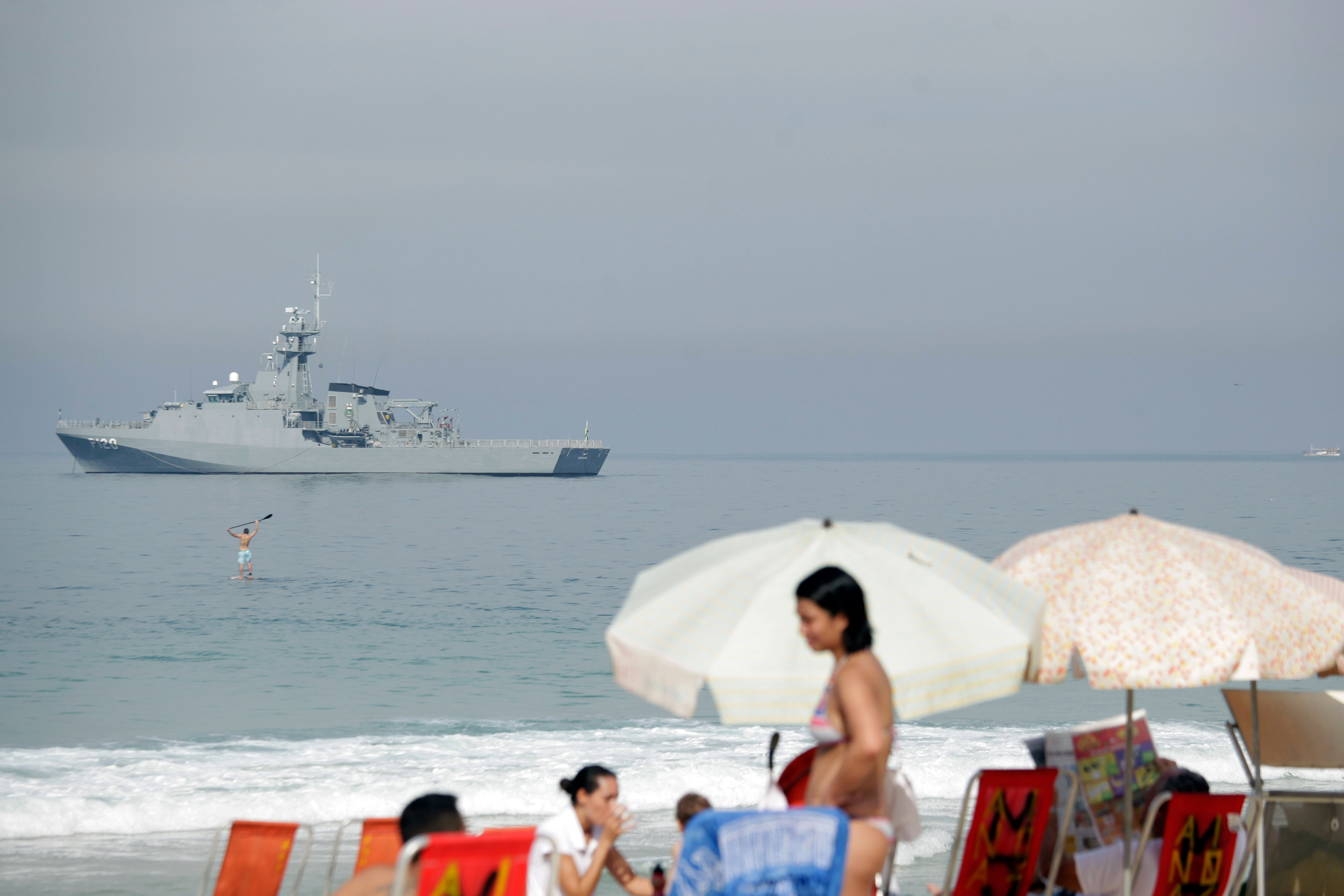
Amazonas off Rio de Janeiro on 9 June 2014.

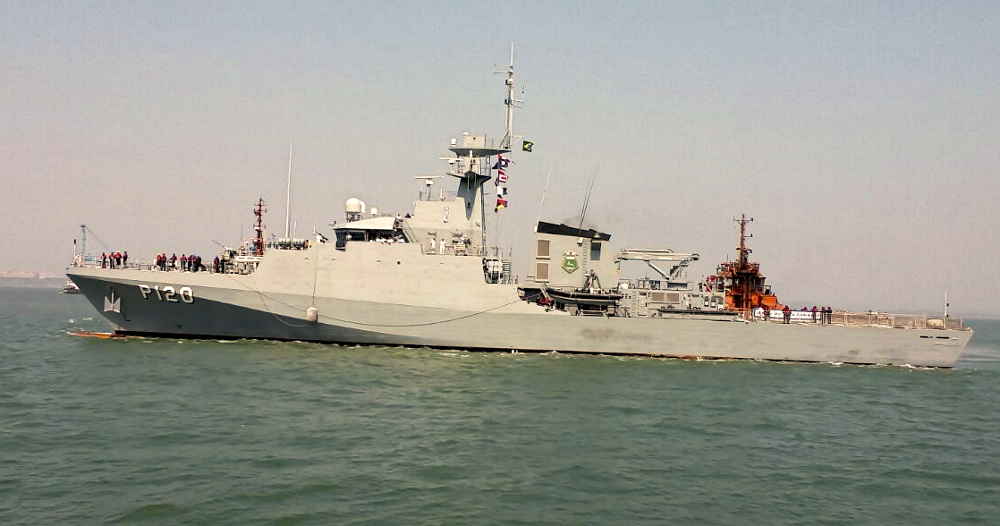
Amazonas entering Goa Harbour during IBSAMAR 2016.

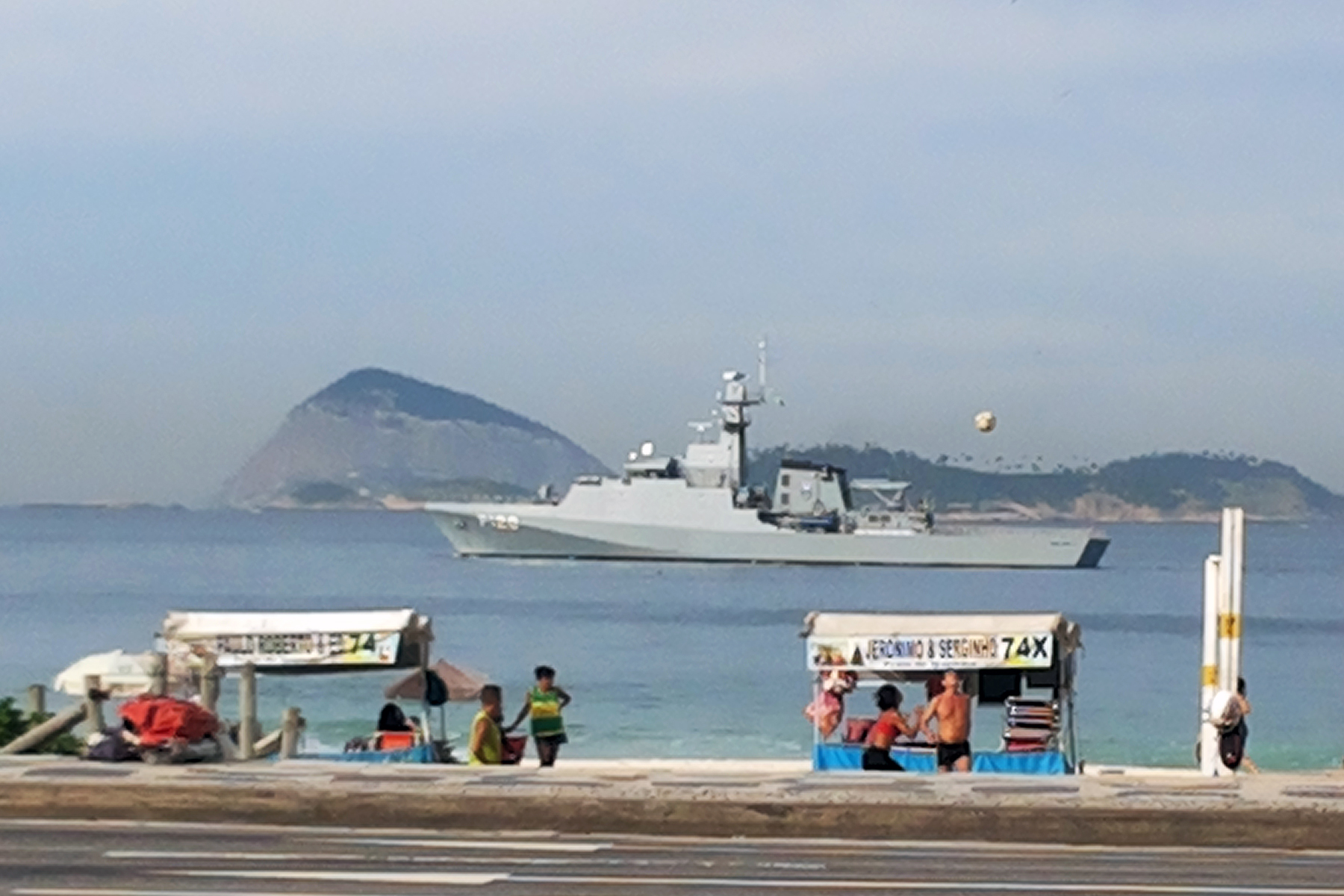
Amazonas off Ipanema beach on 6 June 2017.
