= Amazonas-class offshore patrol vessel =

Brazilian navy ships

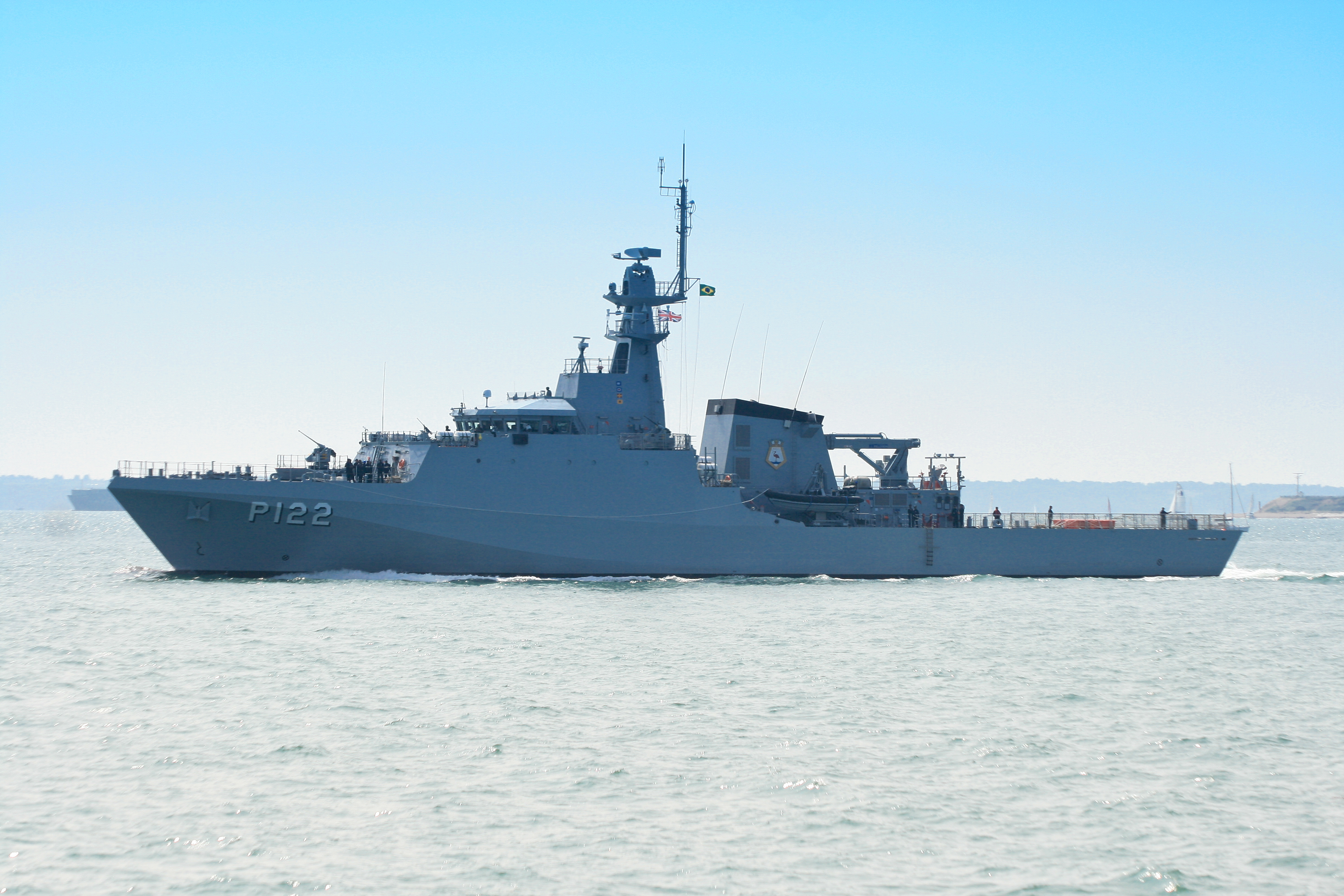
- Araguari departing Portsmouth for Brazil on 12 July 2013

Class overview
- Builders: BAE Systems Maritime – Naval Ships
- Operators: Brazilian Navy
- Planned: 3
- Completed: 3
- Active: 3

General characteristics
- Type: Offshore patrol vessel
- Displacement: 2,000 t (2,000 long tons; 2,200 short tons)
- Length: 90.5 m (296 ft 11 in)
- Beam: 13.5 m (44 ft 3 in)
- Propulsion: 2 × MAN 16V28/33D diesel engines, 14,700 kW (19,713 hp), 2 shafts; 2 × controllable-pitch propellers
- Speed: 25 knots (46 km/h; 29 mph)
- Range: 5,500 nmi (10,200 km)
- Endurance: 35 days
- Complement: 80
- Sensors & processing systems: Batch 2: Kelvin Hughes Ltd SharpEye navigation radar; Terma Scanter 4100 2D radar; BAE CMS-1; Shared Infrastructure operating system
- Armament: 1 × 30 mm DS30M cannon; 2 × 25 mm guns; 2 × 12.7 mm machine guns
- Aviation facilities: 20 m (66 ft) flight deck

The Amazonas class comprises three offshore patrol vessels (OPVs) built by VT Shipbuilding (now BAE Systems Surface Ships). The ships entered service with the Brazilian Navy during 2012 and 2013.

== Design and construction ==
The vessels are based on the Royal Navy's River-class patrol vessels, are 90 m (295 ft) long, and have 80 man crews plus accommodation for 40 troops. They are designed to perform a range of Economic Exclusion Zone (EEZ) management, special operations and maritime law enforcement tasks.

The first vessel was named Port of Spain at her launch at BAE Systems Surface Ships’ Portsmouth facility, on 18 November 2009.

The second was named Scarborough on her launch a day later at Scotstoun in Glasgow, and began sea trials in July 2010, reaching 25.38 knots (47.00 km/h; 29.21 mph).

The third was named San Fernando when launched on 16 July 2010 at Scotstoun on the River Clyde.

== Operators ==
The Amazonas class were originally named as the Port of Spain class and built for the Trinidad and Tobago Coast Guard. Then, despite two of the vessels having been completed at the time and awaiting delivery, and with crew training ongoing in the United Kingdom, the Government of the Republic of Trinidad and Tobago (GORTT) cancelled the order in September 2010.

In December 2011, it was reported that the Brazilian Navy were interested in buying the vessels, and possibly up to five additional vessels of the same design. The sale, for £133 million, was then confirmed on 2 January 2012.

Amazonas was commissioned into the Brazilian Navy on 29 June in Portsmouth. During her one-month voyage to Brazil, she docked in the cities of Natal, Rio Grande do Norte and Salvador, Bahia in September, and was expected to arrive in Rio de Janeiro on 5 October.

== Ships of class ==
Pennant No	Name	Builder	Launched	Commissioned	Fleet	Status	Remarks
P120	Amazonas	BAE Systems Portsmouth	18 November 2009	29 June 2012	Grouping Naval Southeast (Brazilian Navy)	In service	Launched as Port of Spain
P121	Apa	BAE Systems Scotstoun, Glasgow. Scotland	15 July 2010	30 November 2012	Grouping Naval Southeast (Brazilian Navy)	In service	Launched as Scarborough
P122	Araguari	BAE Systems Scotstoun, Glasgow. Scotland	16 July 2010	21 June 2013	Grouping Naval Northeast (Brazilian Navy)	In service	Launched as San Fernando

== Images ==
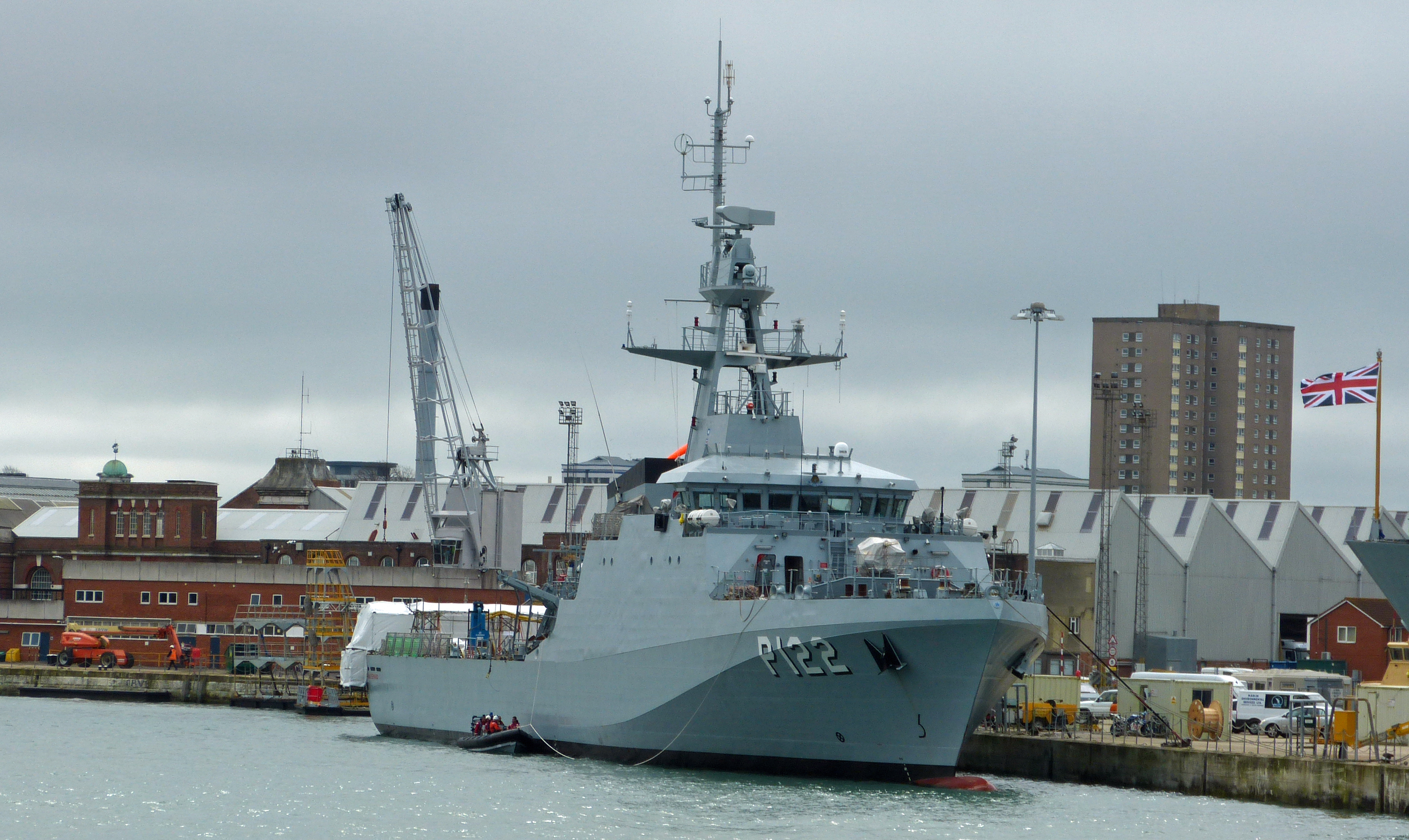
Araguari berthing Portsea, 24 April 2013.

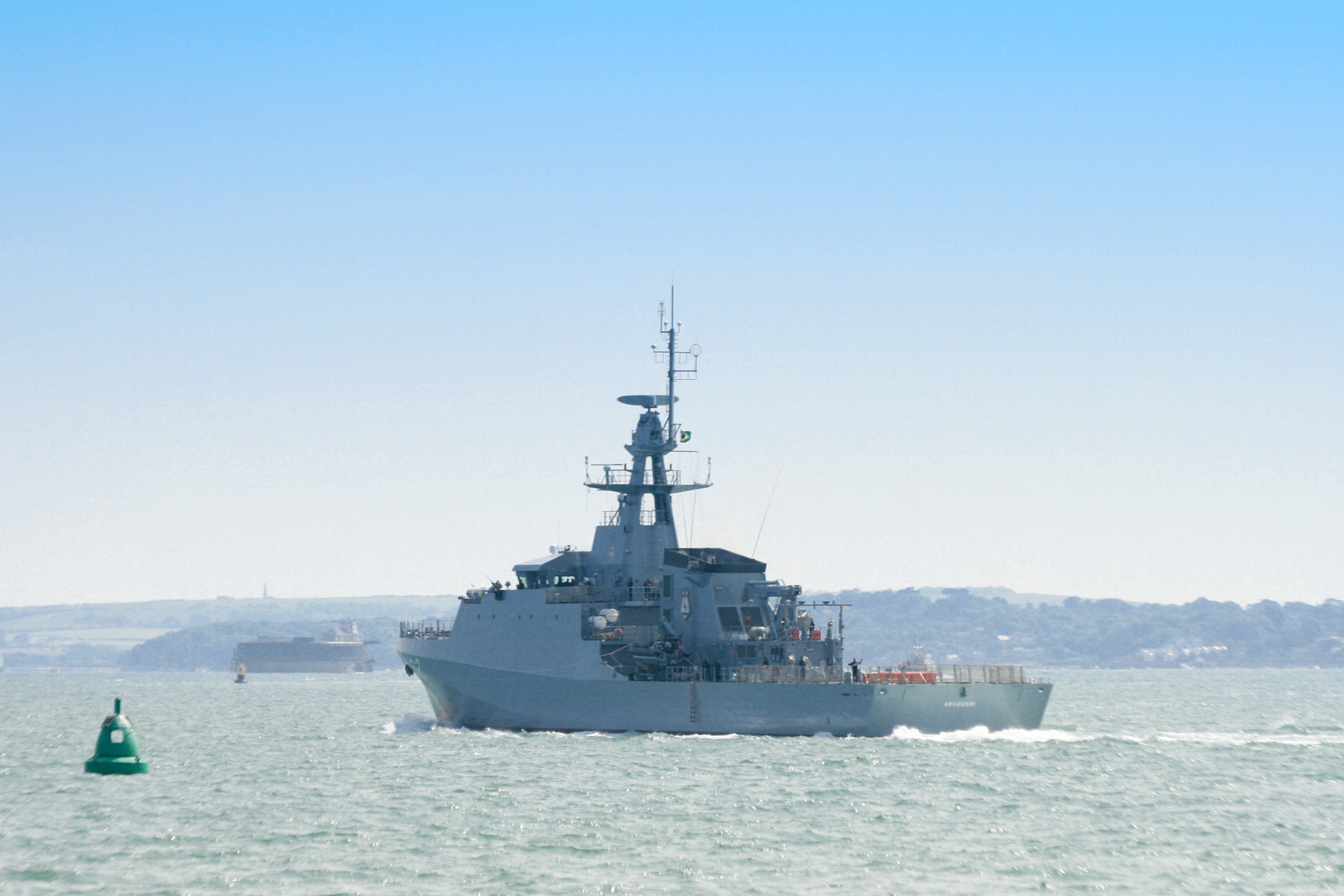
Araguari departing Portsmouth, 12 July 2013.

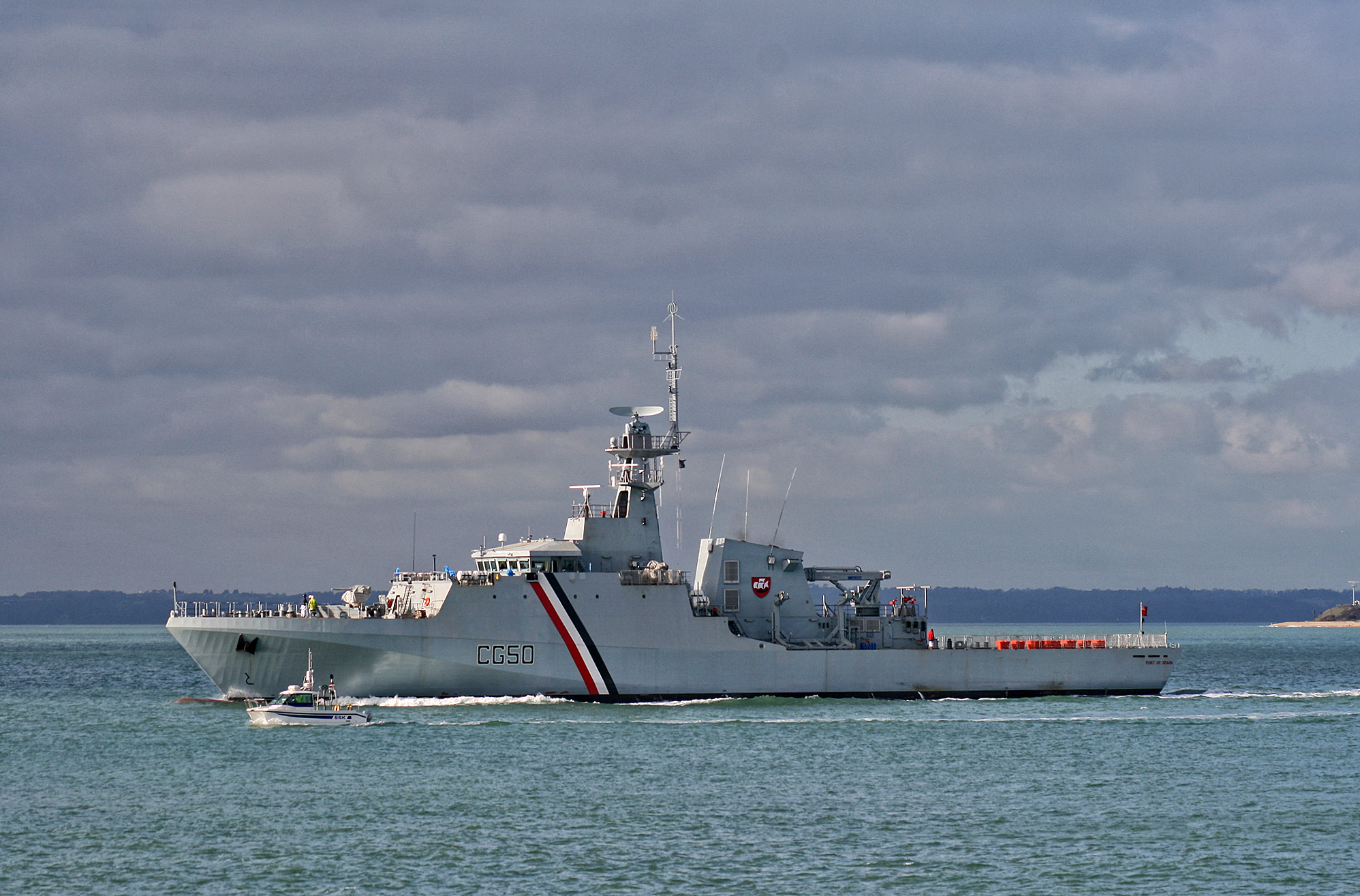
Trinidadian Port of Spain at Portsmouth 2010.

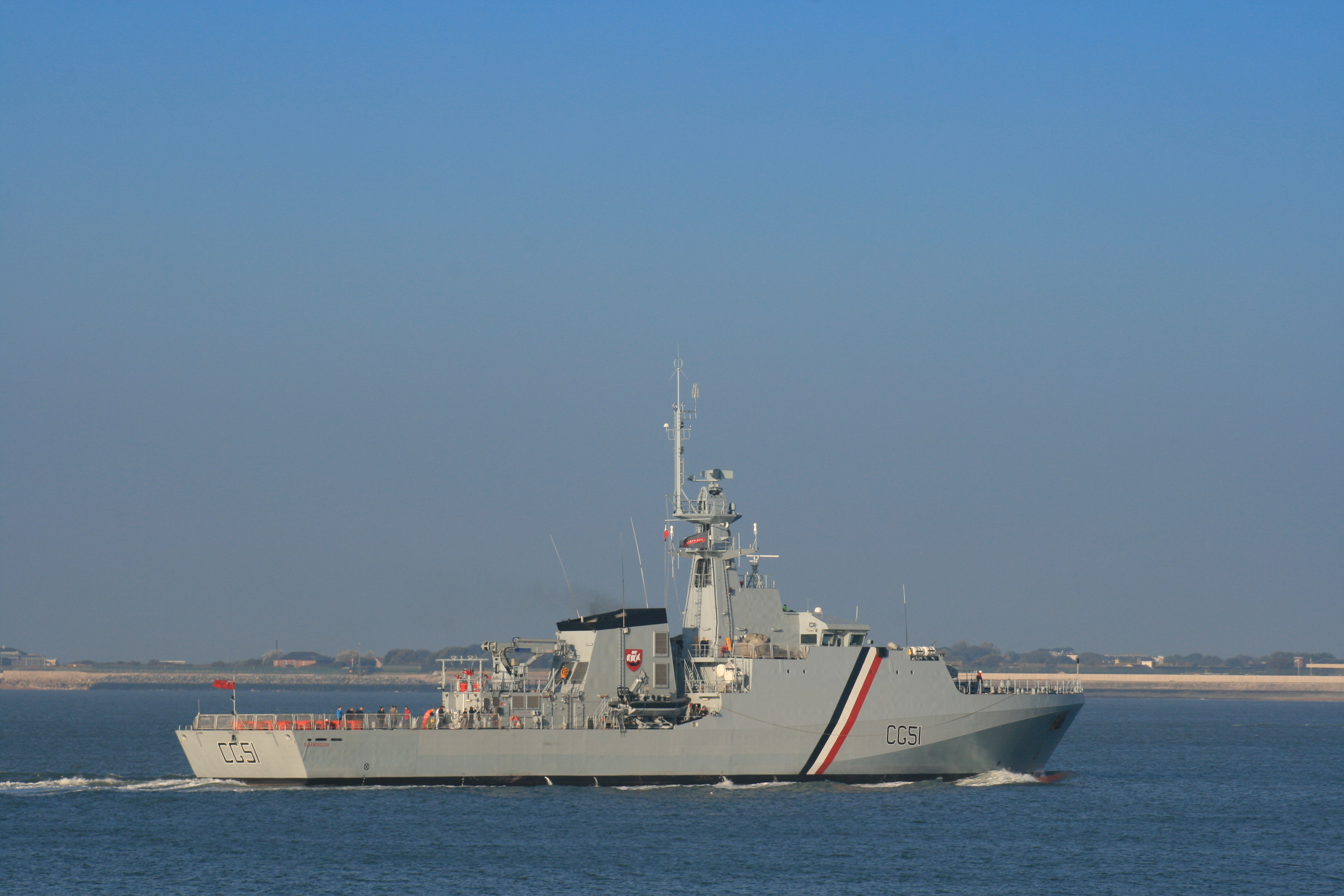
Trinidadian Scarborough at Portsmouth 2010.

== See also ==
- List of naval ship classes in service
- River-class patrol vessel, a design on which the Amazonas-class is based.
