= Brazilian offshore patrol vessel Araguari =

Amazonas-class offshore patrol vessel of Brazilian Navy

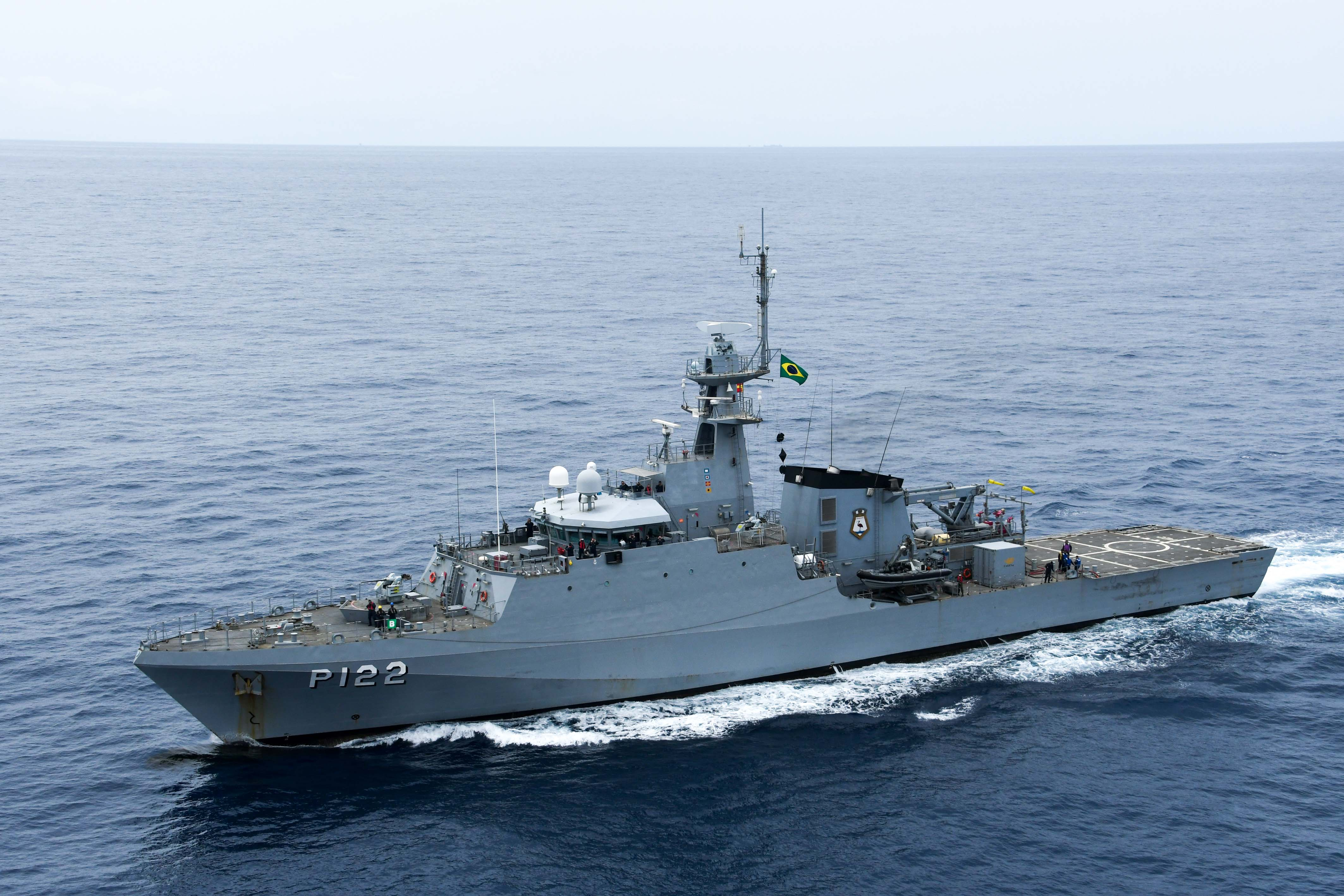

History

Brazil
- Name: Araguari
- Namesake: Araguari River
- Builder: BAE Systems, Glasgow
- Launched: 16 July 2010
- Commissioned: 21 June 2013
- Renamed: from San Fernando
- Home port: Rio de Janeiro
- Identification: IMO number: 9526411; MMSI number: 710495000; Callsign: PWRI; Pennant number: P-122
- Status: Active

General characteristics
- Type: Amazonas-class offshore patrol vessel
- Displacement: 2,000 t (2,000 long tons; 2,200 short tons)
- Length: 90.5 m (296 ft 11 in)
- Beam: 13.5 m (44 ft 3 in)
- Propulsion: 2 × MAN 16V28/33D diesel engines, 14,700 kW (19,713 hp), 2 shafts; 2 × controllable-pitch propellers
- Speed: 25 knots (46 km/h; 29 mph)
- Range: 5,500 nmi (10,200 km)
- Endurance: 35 days
- Complement: 80
- Sensors & processing systems: Terma Scanter 4100, X-band; Ultra Electronics OSIRIS CMS
- Armament: 1 × 30 mm DS30M cannon; 2 × 25 mm guns; 2 × 12.7 mm machine guns
- Aviation facilities: 20 m (66 ft) flight deck

Araguari (P122) is a Amazonas-class offshore patrol vessel currently operated by the Brazilian Navy. She was originally named San Fernando (CG52) while she was being built for the Trinidad and Tobago Coast Guard.

== Background ==
The Amazonas class were originally named as the Port of Spain class and built for the Trinidad and Tobago Coast Guard. Then, despite two of the vessels having been completed at the time and awaiting delivery, and with crew training ongoing in the United Kingdom, the Government of the Republic of Trinidad and Tobago (GORTT) cancelled the order in September 2010.

In December 2011 it was reported that the Brazilian Navy were interested in buying the vessels, and possibly up to five additional vessels of the same design.

== Construction and career ==
San Fernando was built by BAE Systems Maritime in Glasgow and launched on 16 July 2010. The ship was sold to the Brazilian Navy and renamed Araguari (P-122). She was commissioned on 21 June 2013.

== Gallery ==
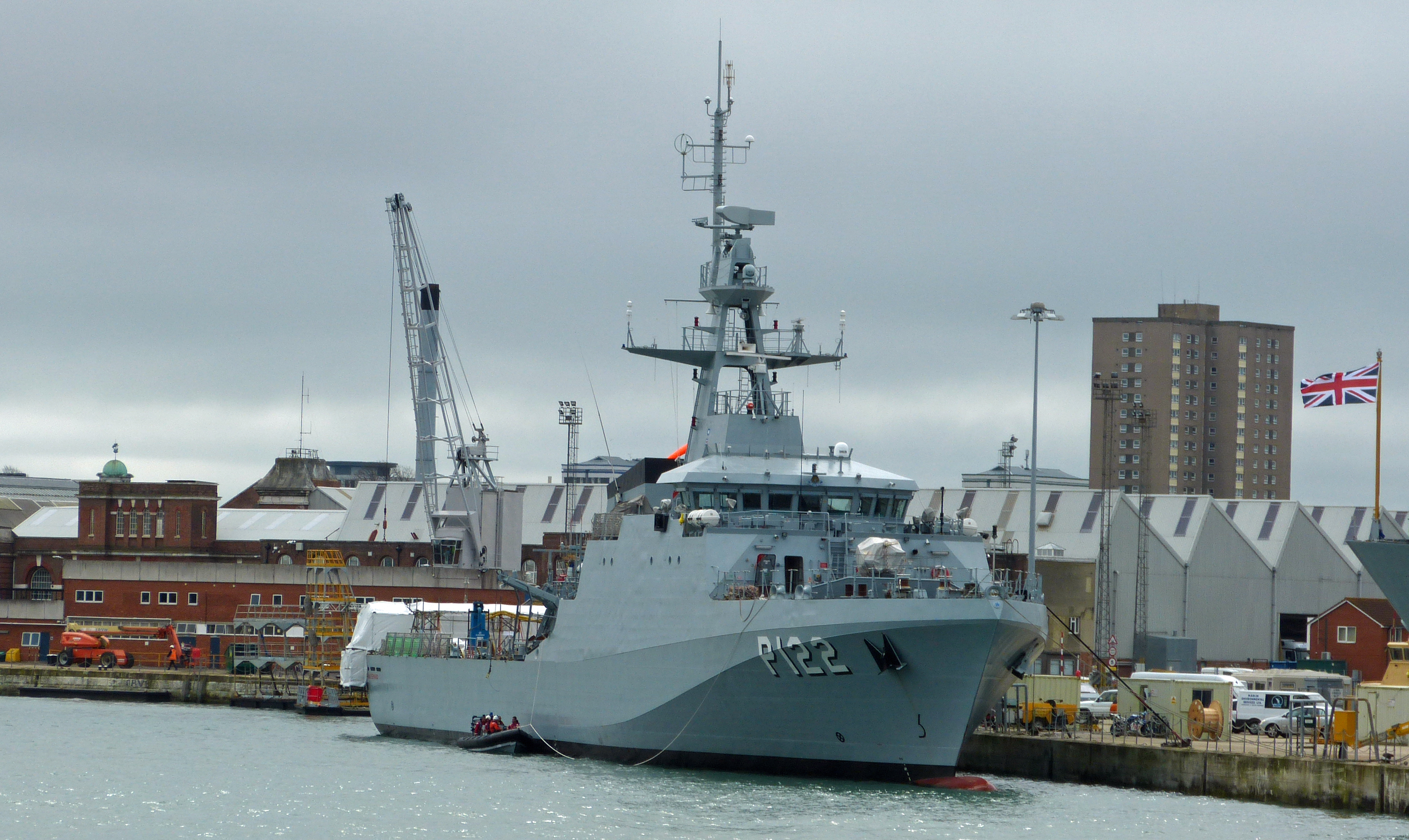
Araguari on 24 April 2013

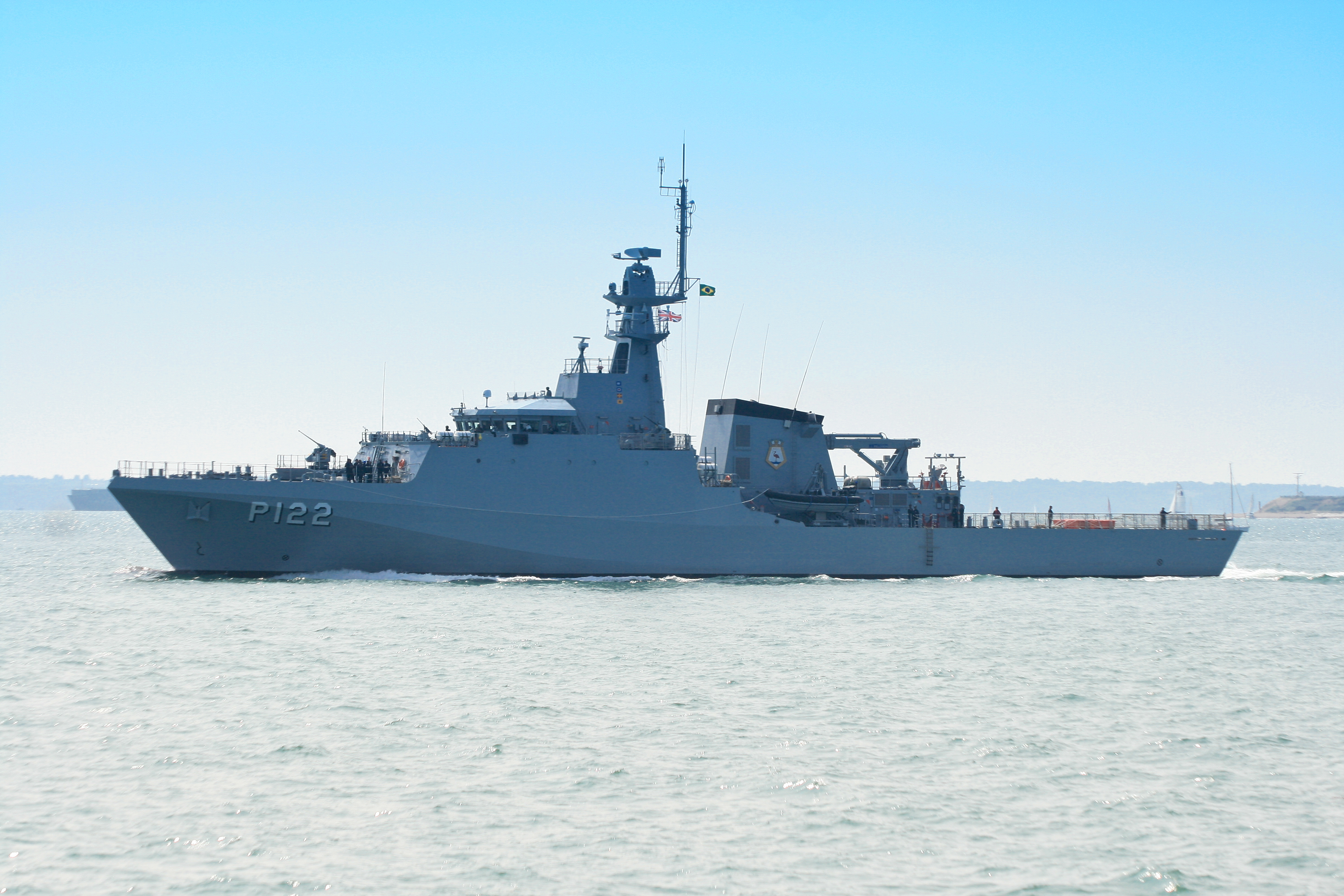
Araguari off Portsmouth on 12 July 2013.

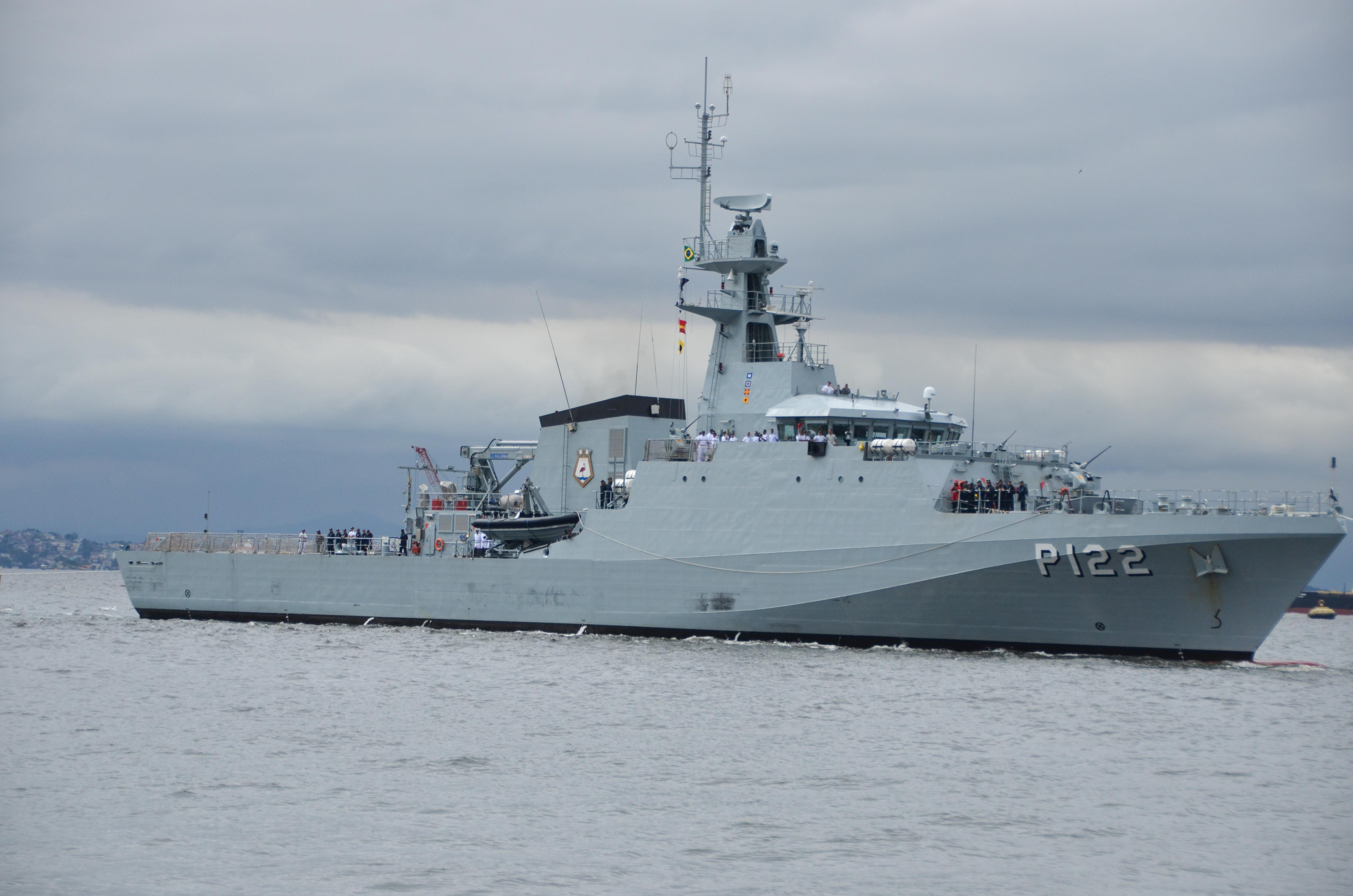
Araguari underway on 18 September 2013.
