= Brazilian offshore patrol vessel Apa =

Amazonas-class OPV of Brazilian Navy

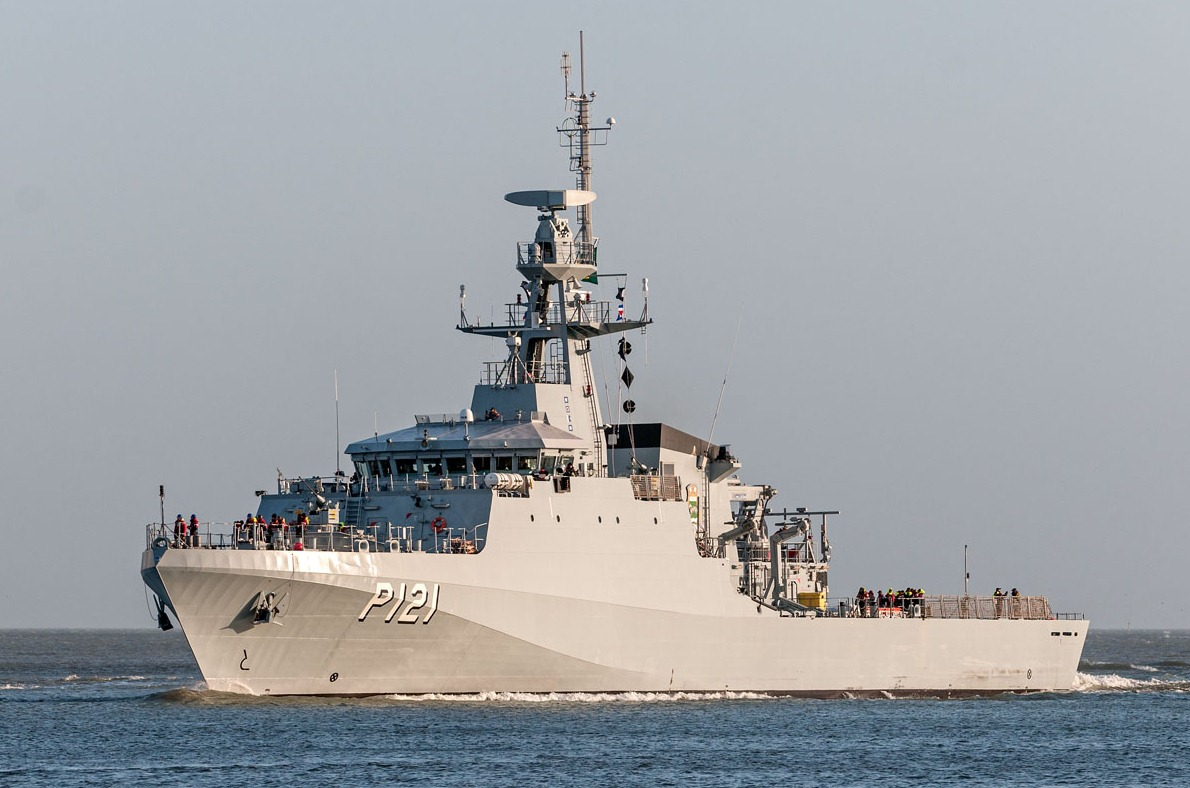
- Apa on 7 May 2013

History

Brazil
- Name: Apa
- Namesake: Apa River
- Builder: BAE Systems, Glasgow
- Launched: 15 July 2010
- Commissioned: 30 November 2012
- Renamed: from Scarborough
- Home port: Rio de Janeiro
- Identification: IMO number: 9526409; MMSI number: 710494000; Callsign: PWAP; Pennant number: P-121
- Status: Active
- Badge

General characteristics
- Type: Amazonas-class offshore patrol vessel
- Displacement: 2,000 t (2,000 long tons; 2,200 short tons)
- Length: 90.5 m (296 ft 11 in)
- Beam: 13.5 m (44 ft 3 in)
- Propulsion: 2 × MAN 16V28/33D diesel engines, 14,700 kW (19,713 hp), 2 shafts; 2 × controllable-pitch propellers
- Speed: 25 knots (46 km/h; 29 mph)
- Range: 5,500 nmi (10,200 km)
- Endurance: 35 days
- Complement: 80
- Sensors & processing systems: Terma Scanter 4100, X-band; Ultra Electronics OSIRIS CMS
- Armament: 1 × 30 mm DS30M cannon; 2 × 25 mm guns; 2 × 12.7 mm machine guns
- Aviation facilities: 20 m (66 ft) flight deck

Apa (P121) is a Amazonas-class offshore patrol vessel currently operated by the Brazilian Navy. She was originally named Scarborough (CG51) while she was being built for the Trinidad and Tobago Coast Guard.

== Background ==
The Amazonas class were originally named as the Port of Spain class and built for the Trinidad and Tobago Coast Guard. Then, despite two of the vessels having been completed at the time and awaiting delivery, and with crew training ongoing in the United Kingdom, the Government of the Republic of Trinidad and Tobago (GORTT) cancelled the order in September 2010.

In December 2011 it was reported that the Brazilian Navy were interested in buying the vessels, and possibly up to five additional vessels of the same design.

== Construction and career ==
Scarborough was built by BAE Systems Maritime in Glasgow and launched on 15 July 2010. The ship was sold to the Brazilian Navy and renamed Apa (P-121). She was commissioned on 30 November 2012.

In October 2023, Apa took part in the MINEX-23 exercise off the coast of Salvador. She had a control station setup on board, which allowed her to act as a 'mothership' for an experimental Brazilian Navy USV tasked with minesweeper duties.

In April 2024 the ship left Rio de Janeiro to take part in operations Guinex-IV and Obangame Express 2024, involving joint counter-piracy patrols and exercises with West African countries in the Gulf of Guinea.

== Gallery ==
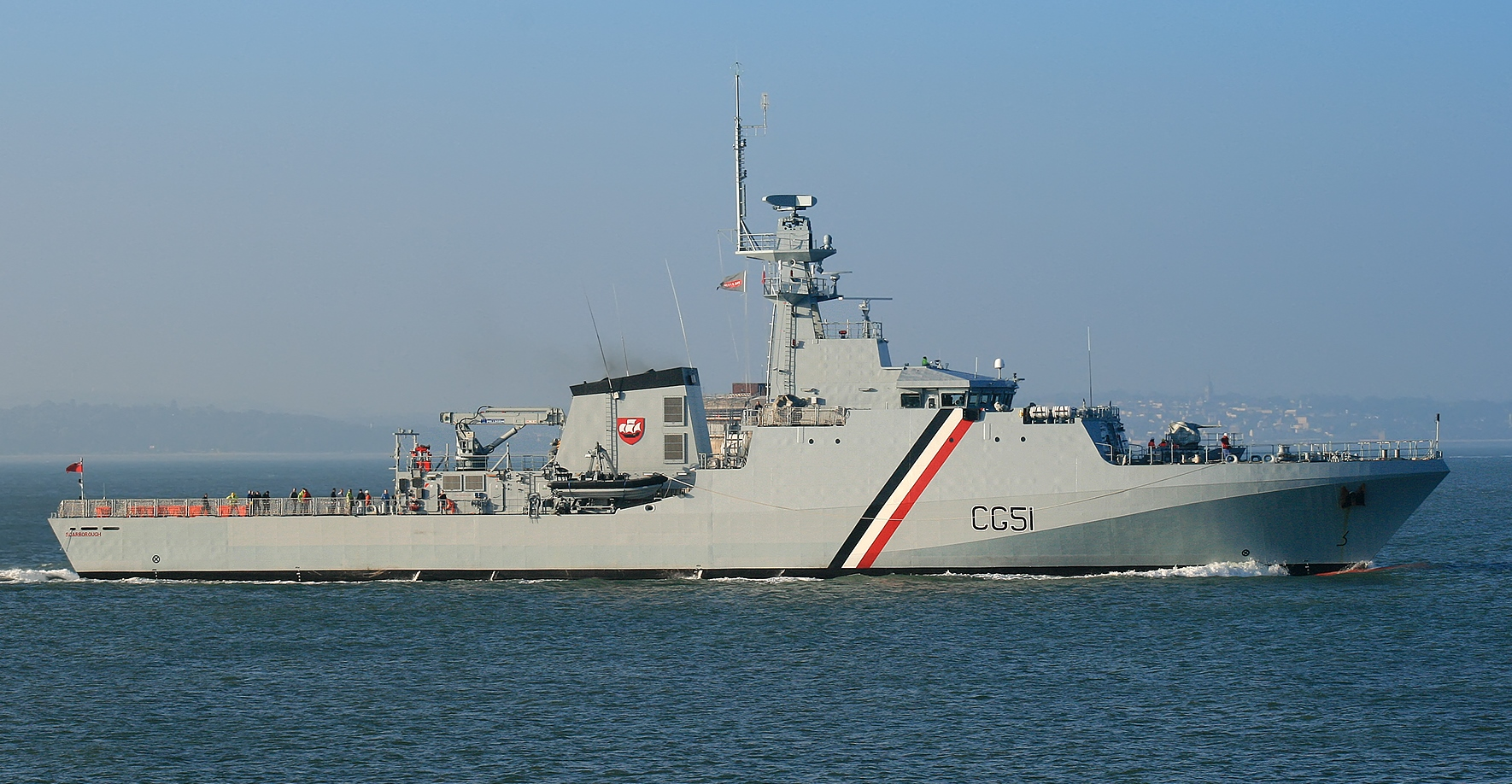
Scarborough underway on 13 February 2010

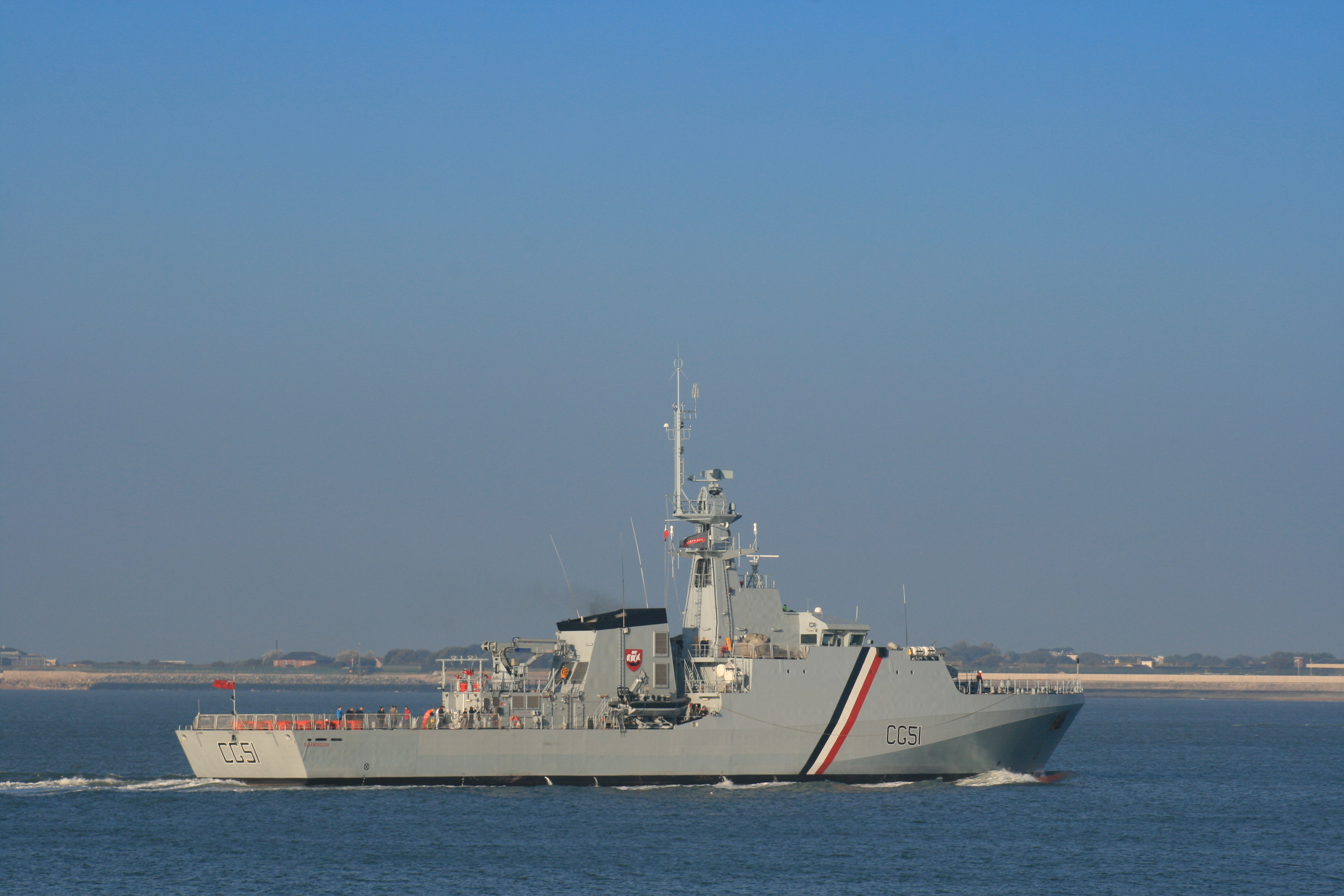

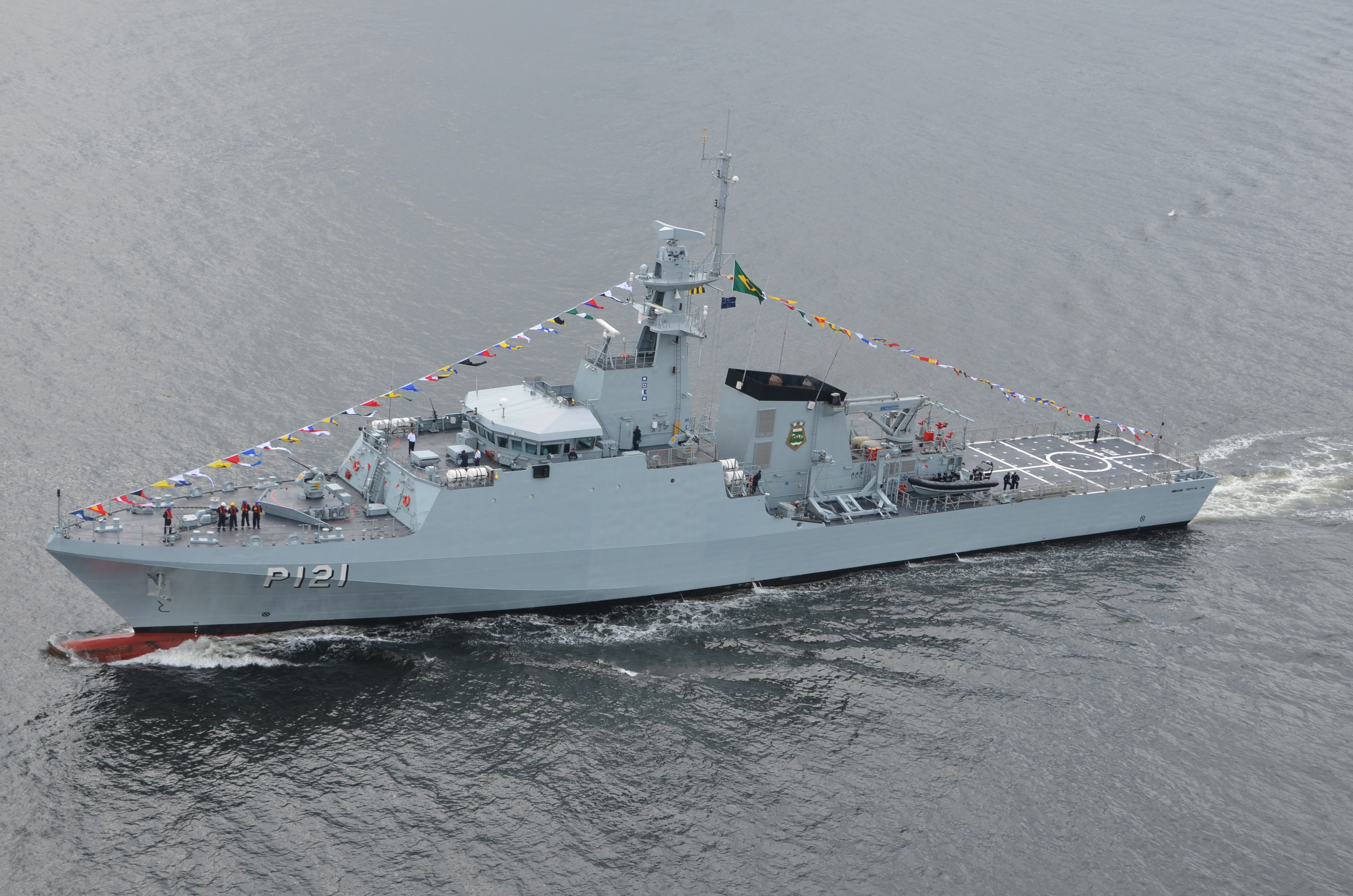
Apa underway on 24 May 2013

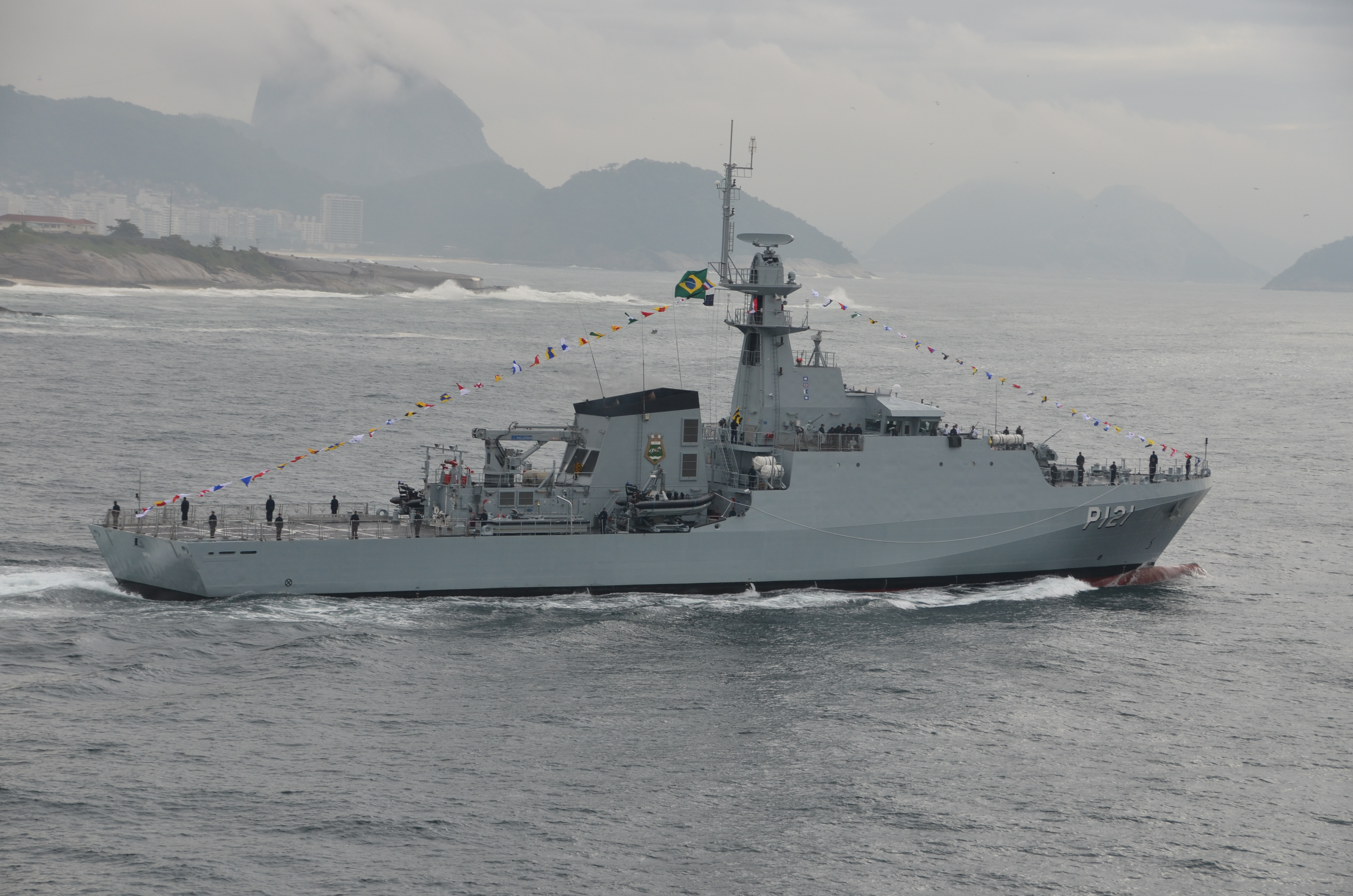

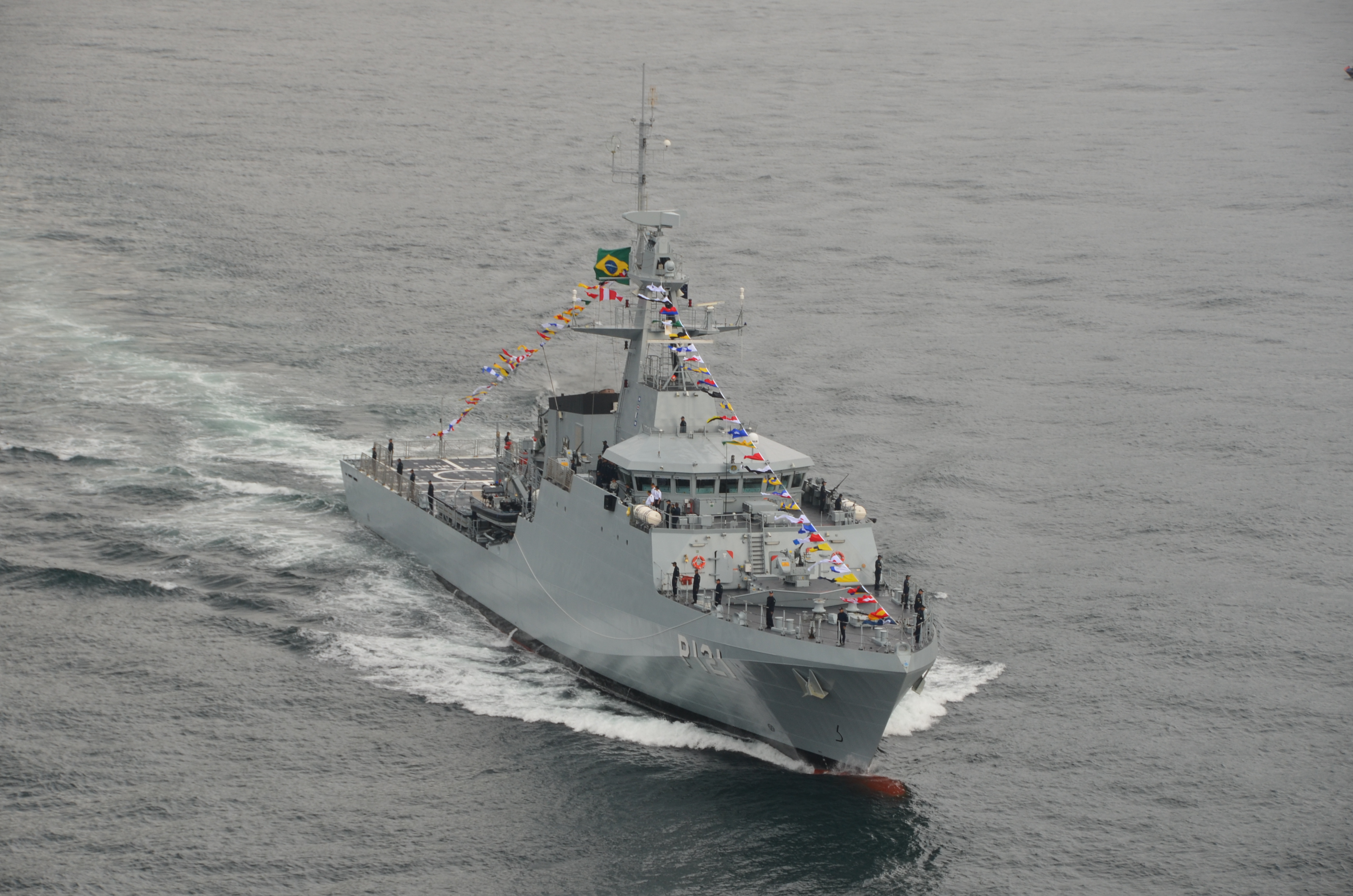

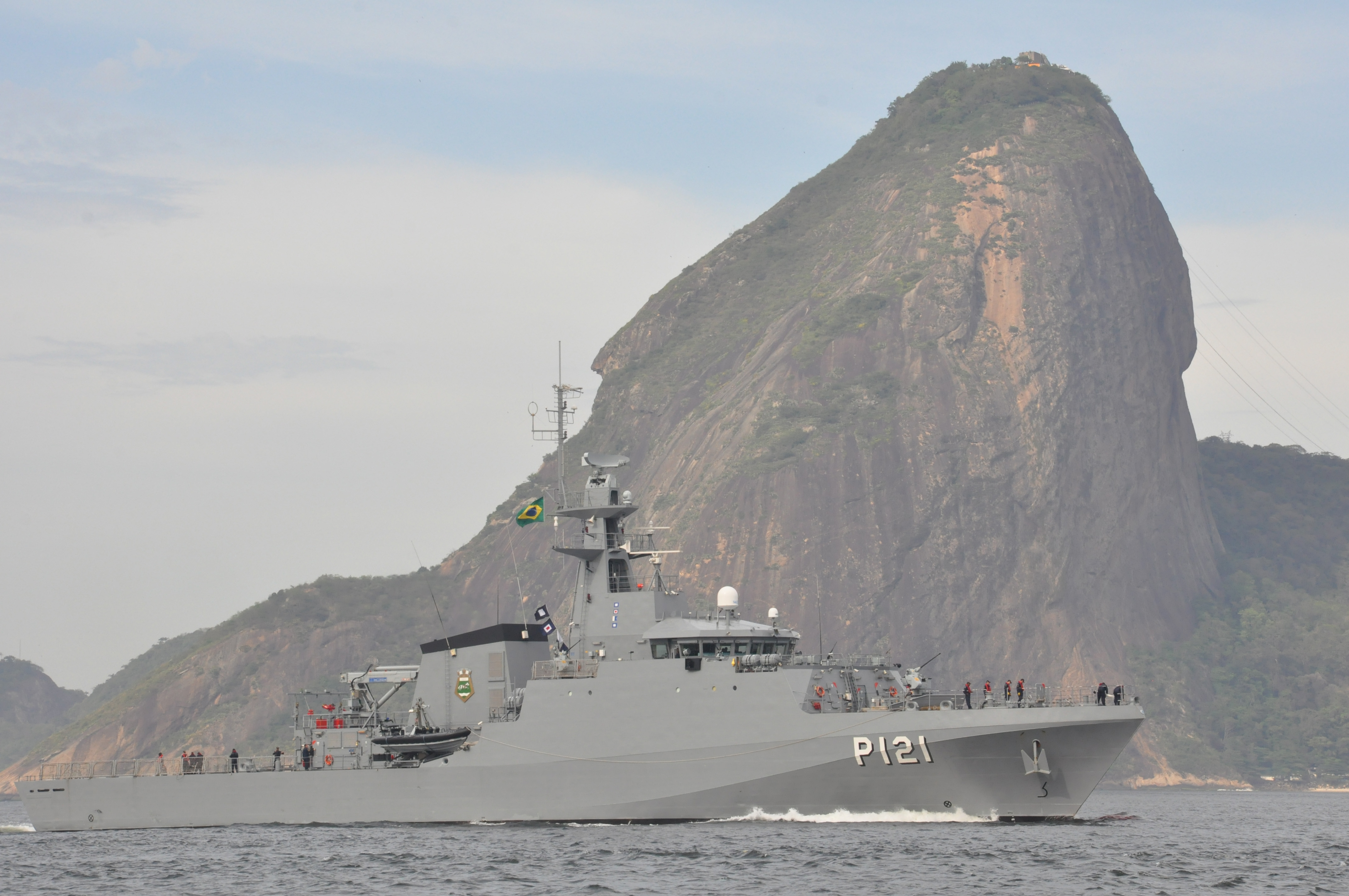
Apa underway on 20 February 2017

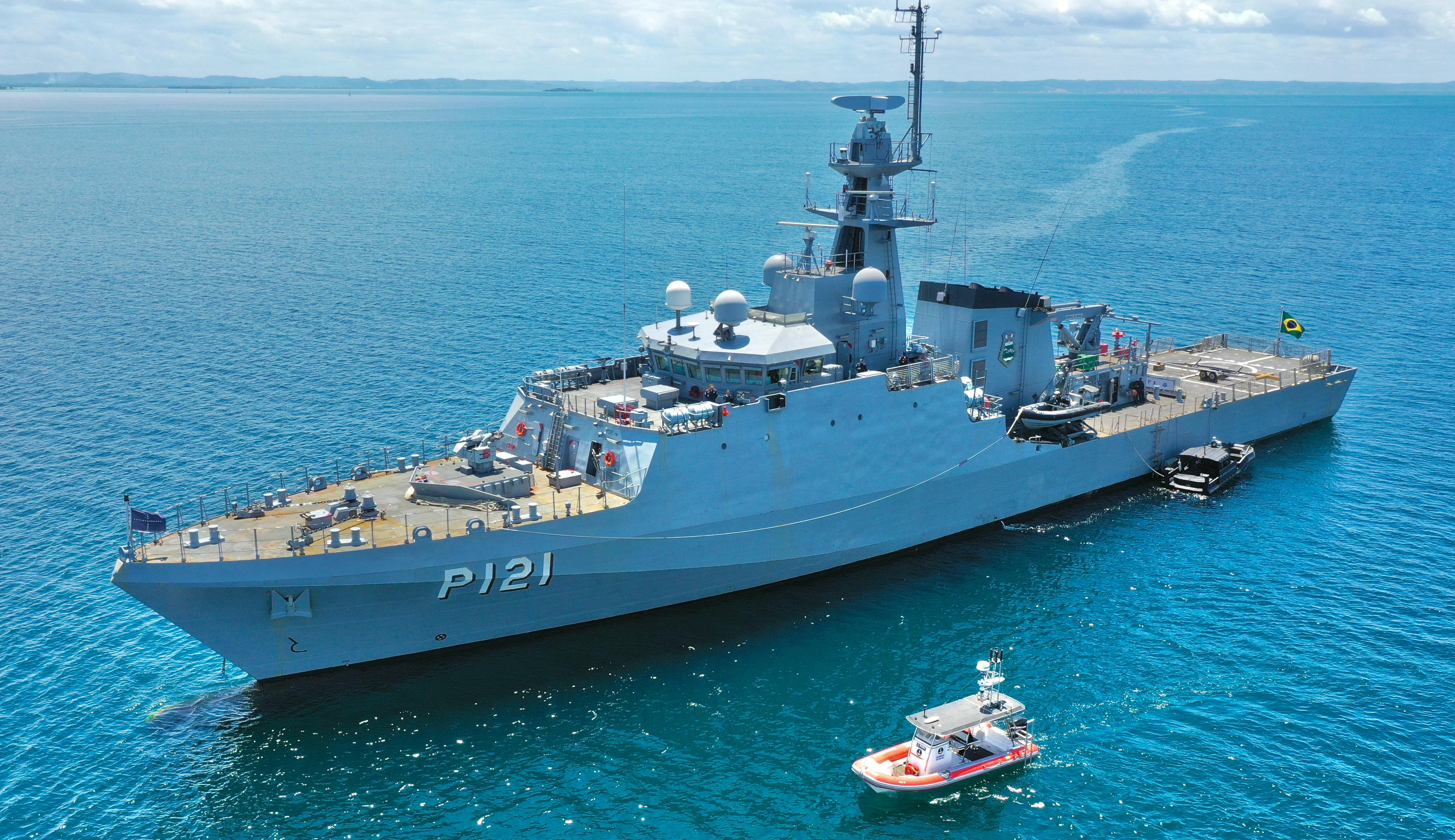
Apa sails alongside the VSNT-Lab USV during MINEX-23

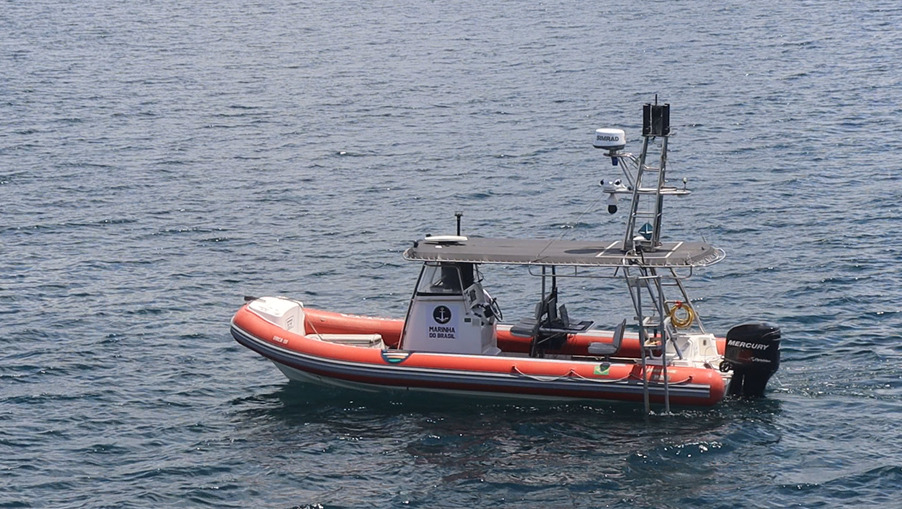
The VSNT-Lab USV
