= Royal Thai Armed Forces =

Unified military forces of Thailand

- กองทัพไทย
- Emblem of the Royal Thai Armed Forces

- Flag of the Royal Thai Armed Forces
- Founded: 18 January 1852; 174 years ago
- Service branches: Royal Thai Army; Royal Thai Navy; Royal Thai Air Force
- Headquarters: Royal Thai Armed Forces Headquarters, Bangkok

Leadership
- Highest Commander of the Armed Forces: King Vajiralongkorn
- Prime Minister: Anutin Charnvirakul
- Minister of Defence: Adul Boonthamcharoen
- Chief of Defence Forces: General Ukris Boontanondha

Personnel
- Military age: 21–45
- Conscription: Yes (Determined through lottery)
- Active personnel: 360,850
- Reserve personnel: 200,000

Expenditure
- Budget: ฿197.29 billion (FY2023)
- Percent of GDP: 1.5%

Industry
- Domestic suppliers: Panus Assembly; Preecha Thavorn Industry; Chaiseri Defence; Defense Technology Institute; Thai Rung Union Car; Thai Aviation Industry; Bangkok Dock; Italthai Marine; Mahidol Adulyadej Naval Dockyard; Marsun Shipbuilding; Asian Marine Services; NARAC Arms Company Limited; Kochasi Weapon Plant
- Foreign suppliers: Australia; Brazil; Belgium; Canada; China (Note: see China–Thailand relations); Czech Republic; Estonia; France; Germany; India; Indonesia; Israel; Italy; Japan; South Korea; Malaysia; Netherlands; New Zealand; Poland; Russia; Singapore; South Africa; Sweden; Switzerland; Taiwan; Turkey; Ukraine; United Kingdom; United States

Related articles
- History: Military history of Thailand: Haw wars; Franco-Siamese conflict; World War I; Western Front; Asian and Pacific theatre; Boworadet rebellion; World War II; Franco-Thai War; South-East Asian theatre; Pacific War; Japanese invasion of Thailand; Malayan campaign; Burma campaign; Bombing of Bangkok; Cold War; Korean War; Malayan Emergency; Laotian Civil War; Vietnam War; Cambodian Civil War; Communist insurgency in Thailand; Communist insurgency in Malaysia; Third Indochina War; Vietnamese border raids in Thailand; Thai–Laotian Border War; Persian Gulf War; 1999 East Timorese crisis; International Force East Timor; War on drugs; Internal conflict in Myanmar; Global War on Terrorism; Iraq War; OEF–Afghanistan; OEF–Horn of Africa; South Thailand insurgency; Burundian Civil War; Cambodia–Thailand border dispute; 2008–2013 Cambodian–Thai border crisis; 2025 Cambodian–Thai conflict
- Ranks: Military ranks of Thailand

The Royal Thai Armed Forces (RTARF; Thai: กองทัพไทย; RTGS: Kong Thap Thai) are the armed forces of Thailand.

The Highest Commander of the Royal Thai Armed Forces (จอมทัพไทย; RTGS: Chom Thap Thai) is the King of Thailand. The armed forces are managed by the Ministry of Defence of Thailand, which is headed by the minister of defence and commanded by the Royal Thai Armed Forces Headquarters, which in turn is headed by the Chief of Defence Forces. The commander-in-chief of the Royal Thai Army is considered the most powerful position in the Thai Armed Forces.

Royal Thai Armed Forces Day is celebrated on 18 January to commemorate the victory of King Naresuan the Great in battle against the Viceroy of Burma in 1593.

== Role ==
The Royal Thai Armed Forces primarily aim to protect the sovereignty and territorial integrity of Thailand. Their duties include defending the Thai monarchy against all threats, maintaining public order, and assisting in national disaster relief and drug control. Additionally, they support social development by cooperating with civilian government initiatives.

There are differing perspectives on the roles of the Thai armed forces. While their official duties are well-defined, some critics argue that their functions extend to preserving ruling class hegemony against democratic movements and facilitating the self-enrichment of high-ranking military officials

The Royal Thai Armed Forces have also played a role in international peacekeeping efforts. Notably, they contributed to the United Nations peacekeeping forces, including their participation in the International Force for East Timor (INTERFET) from 1999 to 2002. Additionally, they were part of the multinational force in Iraq, contributing 423 personnel from 2003 to 2004. This international involvement reflects their expanding role beyond national borders.

== Personnel ==
As of 2020, the Royal Thai Armed Forces (RTARF) comprised approximately 360,850 active duty and 200,000 reserve personnel, which is nearly one percent of Thailand's population of 70 million. This proportion of military personnel in relation to the total population is higher than that of the United States but lower than Vietnam's. The Thai military includes over 1,700 flag officers (generals and admirals), equating to about one general for every 212 troops. This ratio is notably higher than that of the United States military, which as of November 1, 2018, had 920 active duty general and flag officers for a force of 1,317,325 personnel, resulting in one flag officer for every 1,430 troops. On May 2, 2015, 1,043 new flag officers from all three services of the Thai military were sworn in. The number of officers who retired during the same period is not specified.

Observations by some analysts suggest that the goals of Thai generals include aligning with politically favorable parties, securing advantageous postings, and personal enrichment, which reportedly involves sharing gains with subordinates to maintain loyalty.

In early 2021, Thailand's Ministry of Defence announced a plan to reduce the number of flag officers by 25% by 2029. As of March 2021, the RTARF had about 1,400 generals and admirals: 250 at RTARF headquarters, 400 in the army, 250 in the navy, 190 in the air force, and 300 in the Office of the Permanent Secretary of Defence.

=== Conscription ===
Conscription, a national duty outlined in the Constitution of the Kingdom of Thailand, was initiated in 1905. It mandates military service for all Thai citizens, although in practice, it primarily applies to males over 21 years of age who have not completed reserve training. The annual conscription process, typically held in early April, begins with eligible individuals reporting to their selection center at 07:00 on the designated day.

During this process, draftees have the option to volunteer for service or participate in a lottery if they do not volunteer. Those who choose to volunteer undergo thorough physical and mental health evaluations, including a drug test. The results of these drug tests are recorded in the Narcotics Control Board's database. In 2018, data showed that out of 182,910 men tested, 12,209, or 6.7 percent, tested positive for drugs, with the majority detected for methamphetamine, followed by marijuana, and other substances.

Individuals who test positive for drugs are subject to different treatments based on their conscription status. Over 3,000 men who tested positive and were drafted into the military received drug rehabilitation treatment as part of their service. Conversely, those who tested positive but were not drafted underwent a 13-day rehabilitation program in their home provinces.

Candidates who do not meet the physical and mental health standards are exempted from service. Those who pass the examinations and volunteer for enlistment select their preferred service branch (Royal Thai Army, Royal Thai Navy, or Royal Thai Air Force) and a reporting date. They receive official documentation summarizing the draft selection of the year, along with an enlistment order detailing the specifics of their basic training, including the time and location. The process concludes for the day with the dismissal of the enlistees, who then await their reporting date for basic training.

Following the dismissal of the volunteers, the conscription lottery commences at each selection center. The number of individuals conscripted via the lottery is determined by the center's set quota, minus the number of volunteers. Like the volunteers, those participating in the lottery undergo the same physical and mental health assessments, with ineligible individuals being similarly dismissed.

During the lottery, each man draws a card from an opaque box. A black card signifies exemption from military service, and the individual receives a letter of exemption. Conversely, drawing a red card mandates military service, with the induction date specified on the card. Individuals with higher educational qualifications may request a reduction in their service obligation.

In 2018, over 500,000 men were called for selection by the Royal Thai Armed Forces. The combined quota across the forces was approximately 104,000, including 80,000 for the Royal Thai Army, 16,000 for the Royal Thai Navy, and 8,700 for the Royal Thai Air Force. On the selection day, 44,800 men volunteered for service. After accounting for these volunteers and those dismissed due to ineligibility, the remaining quota was approximately 60,000 slots. This quota was to be filled by the approximately 450,000 men participating in the draft lottery, making the overall probability of drawing a red card about 13 percent.

In 2017, a total of 103,097 men participated in the military draft in Thailand, conducted from April 1 to 12. The armed forces required 77,000 conscripts annually. In some cases, certain selection centers did not need to conduct the balloting lottery because their quotas were already fulfilled by volunteers. In these instances, individuals who opted not to volunteer and instead waited for the lottery were issued certificates of exemption.

The duration of military service in Thailand varies depending on whether an individual volunteers and their level of educational attainment. Volunteers are generally required to serve for shorter periods. Those without a high school diploma must serve for two years, irrespective of their volunteer status. High school graduates who volunteer are obligated to serve for one year, whereas those who do not volunteer and draw red cards during the lottery are required to serve for two years. Individuals holding an associate degree or higher and who volunteer have a six-month service period. Those with similar educational qualifications who draw red cards during the lottery may request a reduction in their service time, up to a maximum of one year. University students are permitted to defer their conscription until they have completed their degree or reached the age of 26.

All conscripts in the Thai military are assigned the rank of Private, Seaman, or Aircraftman (OR-1), and they retain this rank throughout their service, regardless of their educational qualifications. Their wages are subject to increase after completing basic training and with time-in-grade.

It is reported by some sources that a significant number of conscripts, over half according to these claims, are utilized as servants to senior officers or clerks in military cooperative shops. However, the placement of conscripts, irrespective of their volunteer status and educational background, is typically determined by the operational needs of their respective service branches. The most common roles assigned include infantryman for Royal Thai Army conscripts, Royal Marine for Royal Thai Navy conscripts, and security forces specialist for Royal Thai Air Force conscripts. Their duties can vary, encompassing military operations, manning security checkpoints, force generation, and performing manual labor or clerical tasks as required by their unit.

Upon completing their service, conscripts are presented with the option to reenlist. In April 2020, for instance, only 5,460 out of 42,000 conscripts eligible for discharge at the end of the month chose to continue their service in the military.

Top government officials in Thailand maintain that conscription is essential for the country. However, there is an ongoing debate regarding the necessity and effectiveness of conscription in 21st-century Thailand. Critics argue that, as of 2019, the external threats to Thailand are minimal. This perspective seems to align with Thailand's new National Security Plan, published in the Royal Gazette on November 22, 2019. Effective from November 19, 2019, to September 30, 2022, the plan suggests that external geopolitical threats are not significant in the forthcoming years, focusing instead on domestic issues, notably concerns about declining faith in the monarchy and political divisions. In September 2023, the Defence Minister announced that conscription will be gradually abolished from April 2024 to 2027.

Amnesty International, in a report from March 2020, alleges that Thai military conscripts are subjected to institutionalized abuse, which is often overlooked by military authorities. The report describes this practice as a "long-standing open secret in Thai society". One notable case cited by Amnesty occurred in 2011, involving the death of Wichian Pueksom, allegedly due to torture by 10 officers. In 2023, eight soldiers involved in his death were convicted of causing bodily harm and received sentences of only 2-4 years in prison.

== Budget ==
The defence budget nearly tripled from 78.1 billion baht in 2005 to 207 billion baht for FY2016 (1 October 2015 – 30 September 2016), amounting to roughly 1.5% of GDP. The budget for FY2017 is 214 billion baht (US$6.1 billion)—including funds for a submarine purchase—a nominal increase of three percent. The proposed budget again represents around 1.5% of GDP and eight percent of total government spending for FY2017. The FY2018 defence budget is 220 billion baht, 7.65% of the total budget. According to Jane's Defence Budgets, the Royal Thai Army generally receives 50% of defense expenditures while the air force and navy receive 22% each. The Ministry of Defense budget for FY2021 is 223,464 million baht, down from 231,745M baht in FY2020.

== History ==
=== Ancient military forces ===
The Royal Siamese Armed Forces was the military arm of the Siamese monarchy from the 12th to the 19th centuries. It refers to the military forces of the Sukhothai Kingdom, the Ayutthaya Kingdom, the Thonburi Kingdom and the early Rattanakosin Kingdom in chronological order. The Siamese army was one of the dominant armed forces in Southeast Asia. As Thailand has never been colonized by a European power, the Royal Thai Armed Forces boasts one of the longest and uninterrupted military traditions in Asia.

The army was organized into a small standing army of a few thousand, which defended the capital and the palace, and a much larger conscription-based wartime army. Conscription was based on the "ahmudan" system, which required local chiefs to supply, in times of war, a predetermined quota of men from their jurisdiction on the basis of population. The wartime army also consisted of elephantry, cavalry, artillery, and naval units.

In 1852, the Royal Siamese Armed Forces came into existence as permanent force at the behest of King Mongkut, who needed a European trained military force to thwart any Western threat and any attempts at colonialisation. By 1887, during the next reign of King Chulalongkorn, a permanent military command in the Kalahom Department was established. The office of Kalahom, as a permanent office of war department, was established by King Borommatrailokkanat (1431–1488) in the mid-15th century during the Ayutthaya Kingdom. Siam's history of organized warfare is thus one of Asia's longest and uninterrupted military traditions. However, since 1932, when the military, with the help of civilians, overthrew the system of absolute monarchy and instead created a constitutional system, the military has dominated and been in control of Thai politics, providing it with many prime ministers and carrying out many coups d'état, the most recent being in 2014.

=== Conflicts ===
The Royal Thai Armed Forces were involved in many conflicts throughout its history, including global, regional and internal conflicts. However, most these were within Southeast Asia. The only three foreign incursions into Thai territory were the Franco-Siamese conflict of 1893, the Japanese invasion of Thailand in December 1941, and in the 1980s with Vietnamese incursions into Thailand that led to several battles with the Thai Army. Operations on foreign territory were either territorial wars (such as the Laos Civil War) or conflicts mandated by the United Nations.

==== Franco-Siamese conflict (1893) ====
With the rapid expansion of the French Empire into Indochina, conflicts necessarily occurred. War became inevitable when a French mission led by Auguste Pavie to King Chulalongkorn to try to bring Laos under French rule ended in failure. The French colonialists invaded Siam from the northeast and sent two warships to fight their way past the river forts and train their guns on the Grand Palace in Bangkok (the Paknam Incident). The French also declared a blockade around Bangkok, which almost brought them into conflict with the United Kingdom. Siam was forced to accept the French ultimatum and surrendered Laos to France, also allowing French troops to occupy the Thai province of Chantaburi for several decades.

==== World War I (1917–1918) ====
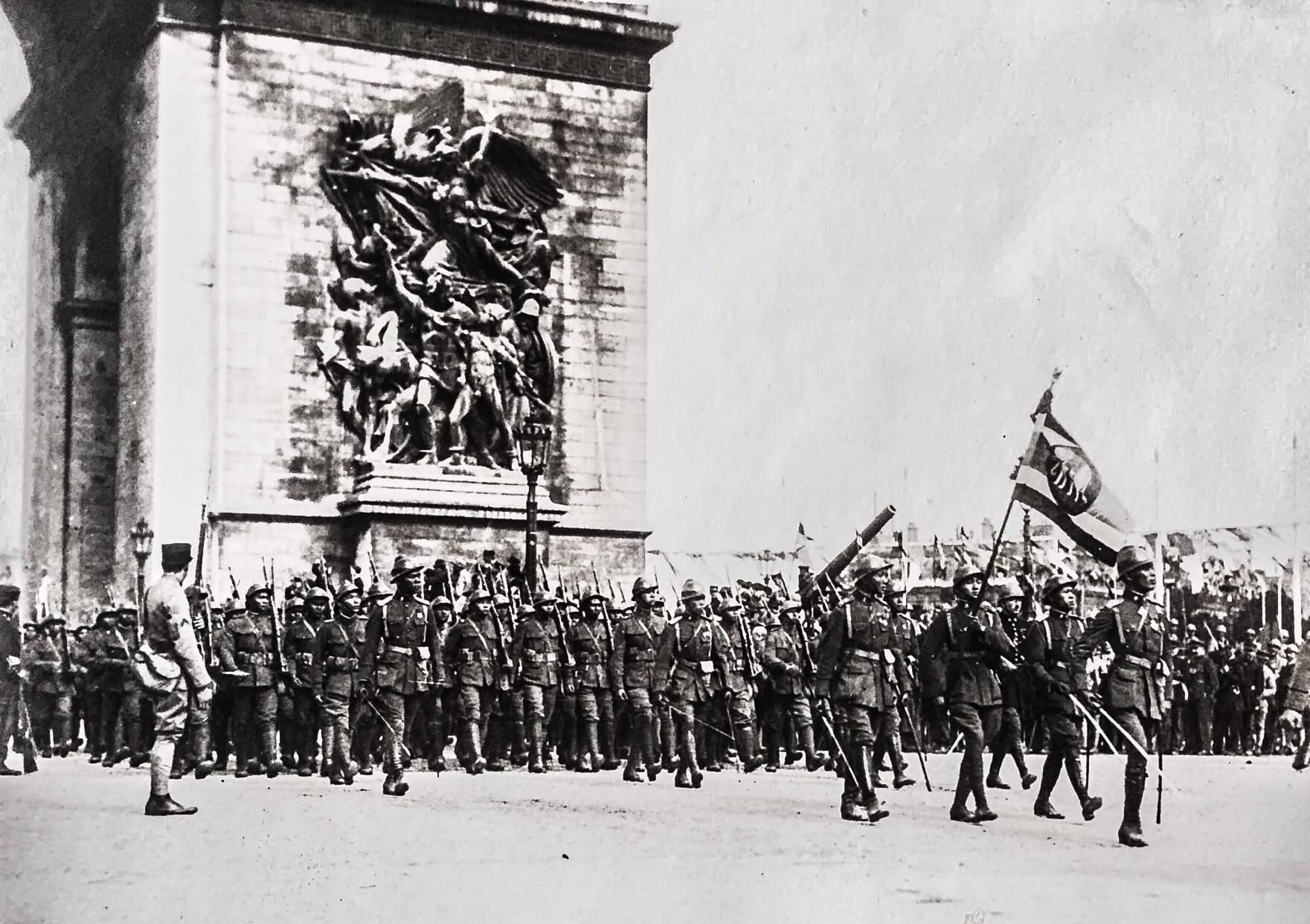
The Siamese Expeditionary Force in Paris, 1919.

King Vajiravudh on 22 July 1917 declared war on the Central Powers and joined the Entente Powers on the Western Front. He sent a volunteer corps, the Siamese Expeditionary Force, composed of 1,233 modern-equipped and trained men commanded by Field Marshal Prince Chakrabongse Bhuvanath. The force included air and medical personnel, the medical units actually seeing combat. Siam became the only independent Asian nation with forces in Europe during the Great War. Although Siam's participation militarily was minimal, it enabled the revision or complete cancellation of so-called "unequal treaties" with the Western powers. The Expeditionary Force was given the honour of marching in the victory parade under the Arc de Triomphe in Paris. Nineteen Siamese soldiers died during the conflict, and their ashes are interred in the World War I monument at the north end of Bangkok's Pramane Grounds.

==== Franco-Thai War (1940–1941) ====
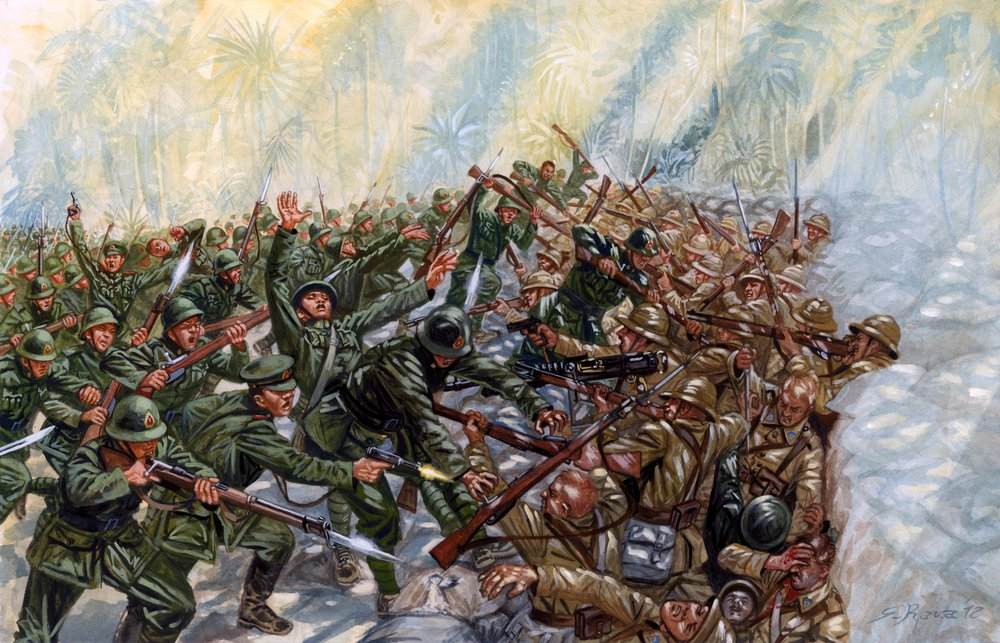
A clash in the battle of Phum Preav, during the Franco-Thai War, between the 3rd Battalion of Phra Nakhon Division, Burapha Army and the 3rd Battalion of the 5th Foreign Regiment, French Foreign Legion (3/5e REI) at 16 January 1941.

The Franco-Thai War began in October 1940, when the country under the rule of Field Marshal Prime Minister Plaek Phibunsongkhram followed up border clashes by invading a French Indo-China, under the Vichy regime (after the Nazi occupation of Paris) to regain lost land and settle territorial disputes. The war also bolstered Phibun's program of promoting Thai nationalism. The war ended indecisively, with Thai victories on land and a naval defeat at sea. However, the disputed territories in French Indochina were ceded to Thailand.

==== World War II (1942–1945) ====
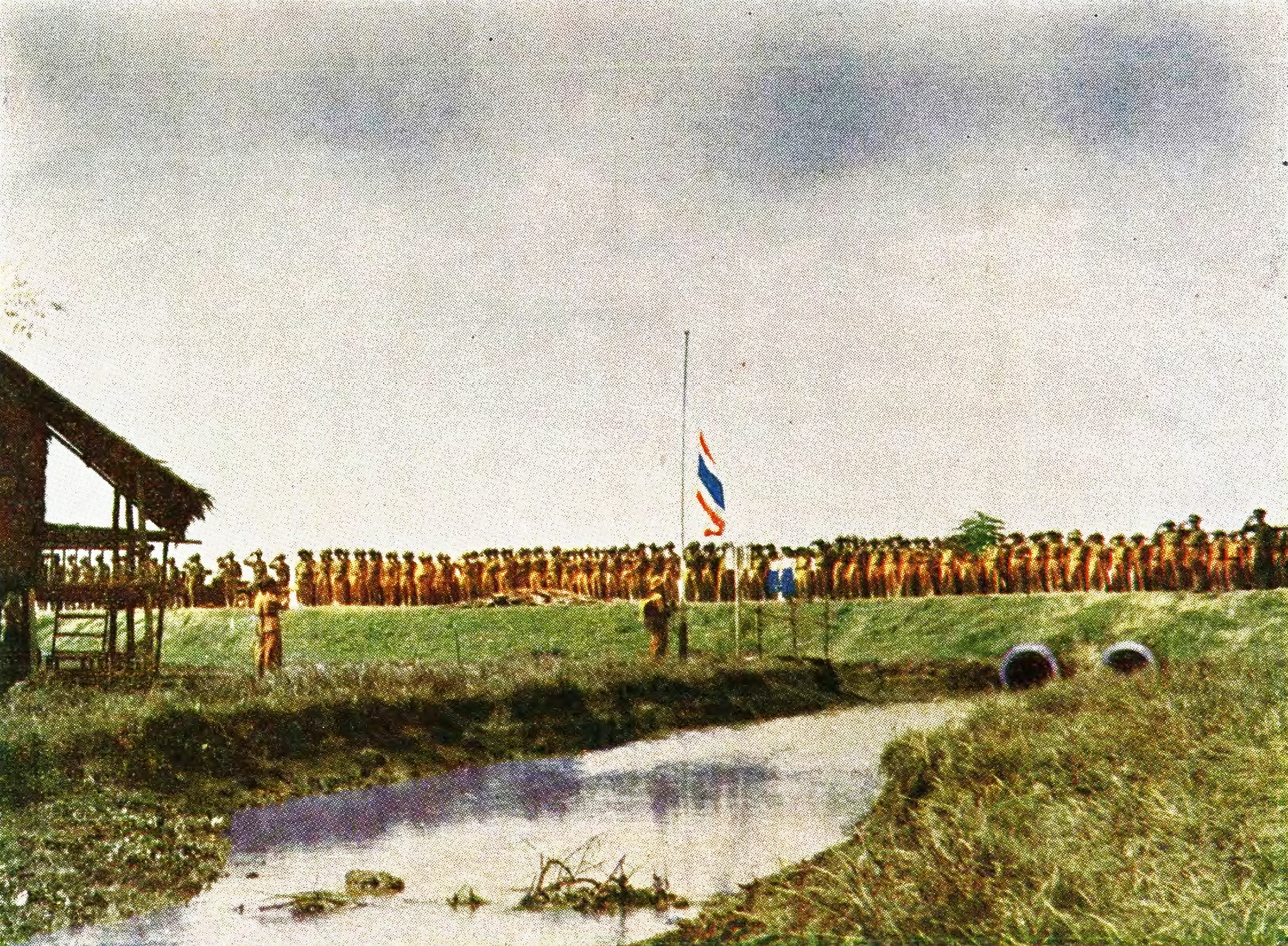
Thai soldiers and governmental officials occupying a Burmese village.

To attack British India, British Burma and British Malaya, the Empire of Japan needed to use bases in Thailand. By playing both nations against one another, Prime Minister Phibunsongkhram was able to maintain a degree of neutrality for some time. However, this ended in the early hours of 8 December 1941, when Japan launched a surprise attack on Thailand at nine places along the coastline and from French Indo-China. The greatly outnumbered Thai forces put up resistance, but were soon overwhelmed. By 07:30, Phibun ordered an end to hostilities, though resistance continued for at least another day until all units could be notified. Phibun signed an armistice with Japan that allowed the empire to move its troops through Thai territory. Impressed by Japan's easy conquest of British Malaya, Phibun formally made Thailand part of the Axis by declaring war on the United Kingdom and the United States, though the Regent refused to sign it in the young king's name. (The Thai ambassador to Washington refused to deliver the declaration, and the United States continued to consider Thailand an occupied country.) An active and foreign-assisted underground resistance movement, the Free Thai, was largely successful and helped Thailand to be viewed positively in the eyes of the victorious Allies after the war and be treated as an occupied nation rather than a defeated enemy.

==== Korean War (1950–1953) ====
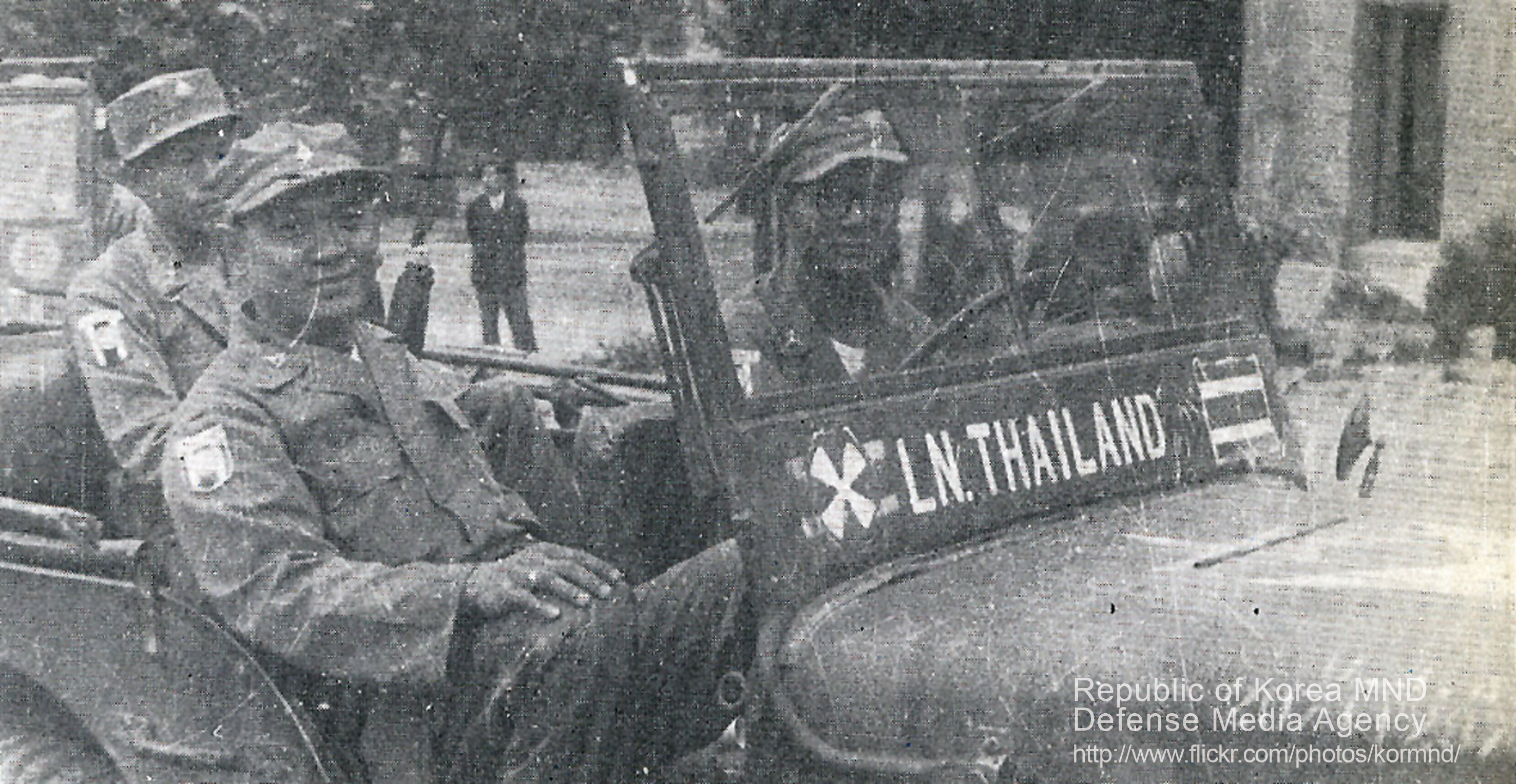
Thailand soldiers arriving at Busan

During the United Nations-mandated conflict in the Korean Peninsula, Thailand provided the reinforced 1st Battalion of the 21st Infantry Regiment, Some 65,000 Thais served in Korea during the war. Thai foot soldiers took part in the 1953 Battle of Pork Chop Hill. During the war the battalion was attached at various times to U.S. 187th Airborne Regimental Combat Team and the British 29th Infantry Brigade. The kingdom also provided four naval vessels, the HTMS Bangprakong, Bangpako, Tachin, and Prasae, and an air transport unit to the UN command structure. The Thai contingent was actively engaged and suffered heavy casualties, including 139 dead and more than 300 wounded. They remained in South Korea after the cease fire, returning to Thailand in 1955.

==== Vietnam War (1955–1975) ====
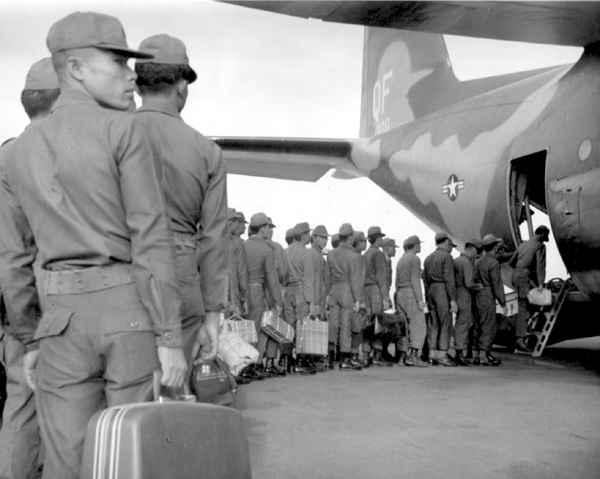
Thai soldiers boarding a USAF aircraft, during the Vietnam War.

Due to its proximity to Thailand, Vietnam's conflicts were closely monitored by Bangkok. Thai involvement did not become official until the total involvement of the United States in support of South Vietnam in 1963. The Thai government then allowed the United States Air Force in Thailand to use its air and naval bases. At the height of the war, almost 50,000 American military personnel were stationed in Thailand, mainly airmen.

In October 1967 a regiment-size Thai unit, the Queen's Cobras, were sent to Camp Bearcat at Bien Hoa, to fight alongside the Americans, Australians, New Zealanders and South Vietnamese. About 40,000 Thai military would serve in South Vietnam, with 351 killed in action and 1,358 wounded. Thai troops earned a reputation for bravery and would serve in Vietnam until 1971, when the men of the Royal Thai Army Expeditionary Division (Black Panthers) returned home.

Thailand was also involved in the Laotian Civil War, supporting covert operations against the communist Pathet Lao and the North Vietnamese from 1964 to 1972.

By 1975 relations between Bangkok and Washington had soured, and the government of Kukrit Pramoj requested the withdrawal of all US military personnel and the closure of all US bases. This was completed by March 1976.

==== Communist insurgency (1976–1980s) ====
The communist victory in Vietnam in 1975 emboldened the communist movement in Thailand, which had been in existence since the 1920s. After the Thammasat University massacre of leftist student demonstrators in 1976 and the repressive policies of right-wing Prime Minister Tanin Kraivixien, sympathies for the movement increased. By the late-1970s, it is estimated that the movement had as many as 12,000 armed insurgents, mostly based in the northeast along the Laotian border and receiving foreign support. By the 1980s, however, all insurgent activities had been defeated. In 1982 Prime Minister Prem Tinsulanonda issued a general amnesty for all former communist insurgents.

==== Vietnamese border raids (1979–1988) ====
With the Vietnamese invasion of Cambodia in 1978, communist Vietnam had a combined force of about 300,000 in Laos and Cambodia. This posed a massive potential threat to the Thais, as they could no longer rely on Cambodia to act as a buffer state. Small encounters occasionally took place when Vietnamese forces crossed into Thailand in pursuit of fleeing Khmer Rouge troops. However, a full and official conflict was never declared, as neither country wanted it.

==== Thai–Laotian Border War (1987–1988) ====
This was a small conflict over mountainous territory including three disputed villages on the border between Sainyabuli Province in Laos and Phitsanulok Province in Thailand, whose ownership had been left unclear by the map drawn by the French some 80 years earlier. Caused by then-Army commander Chavalit Yongchaiyudh against the wishes of the government, the war ended with a stalemate and return to status quo ante bellum. The two nations suffered combined casualties of about 1,000.

==== East Timor (1999–2002) ====
After the East Timor crisis, Thailand, with 28 other nations, provided troops for the International Force for East Timor or INTERFET. Thailand also provided the force commander, Lieutenant General Winai Phattiyakul. The force was based in Dili and lasted from 25 October 1999 to 20 May 2002.

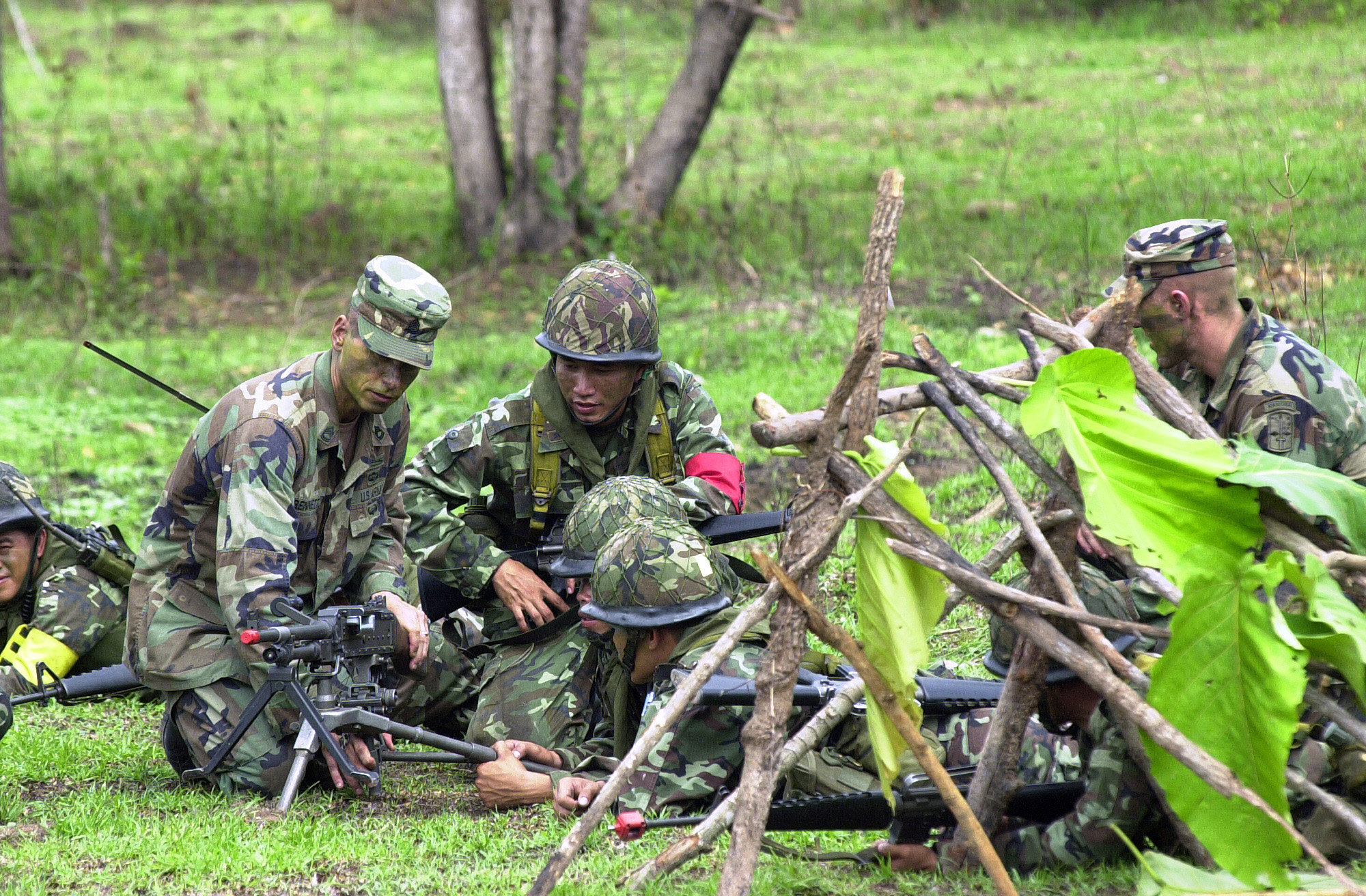
Thai and US military training together during Cobra Gold 2001.

==== Iraq War (2003–2004) ====
After the successful US invasion of Iraq, Thai Humanitarian Assistance Task Force 976 Thai-Iraq Thailand contributed 423 non-combat troops in August 2003 to nation building and medical assistance in post-Saddam Iraq. The Thais could not leave their base in Karbala as their rules governing their participation restricted them to humanitarian assistance which could not be accomplished due to the insurgency during the Thai's tenure in Iraq. Troops of the Royal Thai Army were attacked in the 2003 Karbala bombings, which killed two soldiers and wounded five others. However, the Thai mission in Iraq was considered an overall success, and Thailand withdrew its forces in August 2004. The mission is considered the main reason the United States decided to designate Thailand as a major non-NATO ally in 2003.

==== South Thailand insurgency (2001–ongoing) ====
The ongoing southern insurgency had begun in response to Prime Minister Plaek Phibunsongkhram's 1944 National Cultural Act, which replaced the use of Malaya in the region's schools with the Thai language and also abolished the local Islamic courts in the three ethnic Malay and Muslim majority border provinces of Yala, Pattani, and Narathiwat. However, it had always been on a comparatively small scale. The insurgency intensified in 2001, during the government of Prime Minister Thaksin Shinawatra. Terrorist attacks were now extended to the ethnic Thai minority in the provinces. The Royal Thai Armed Forces also went beyond their orders and retaliated with strong armed tactics that only encouraged more violence. By the end of 2012 the conflict had claimed 3,380 lives, including 2,316 civilians, 372 soldiers, 278 police, 250 suspected insurgents, 157 education officials, and seven Buddhist monks. Many of the dead were Muslims themselves, but they had been targeted because of their presumed support of the Thai government.

==== Cambodian–Thai border stand-off (2008–2011) ====
The latent territorial dispute over the Angkorian temple of Preah Vihear turned violent in 2008, escalating from military incursions to clashes and expanding to other contested temples, before a troop‑withdrawal agreement in December 2011. Later, in 2013, an International Court of Justice ruling affirmed Cambodia's sovereignty over the temple and particularly bounded surrounding land.

==== Sudan (2010–2011) ====
Thai soldiers joined UNMIS in 2011.

=== Current developments ===
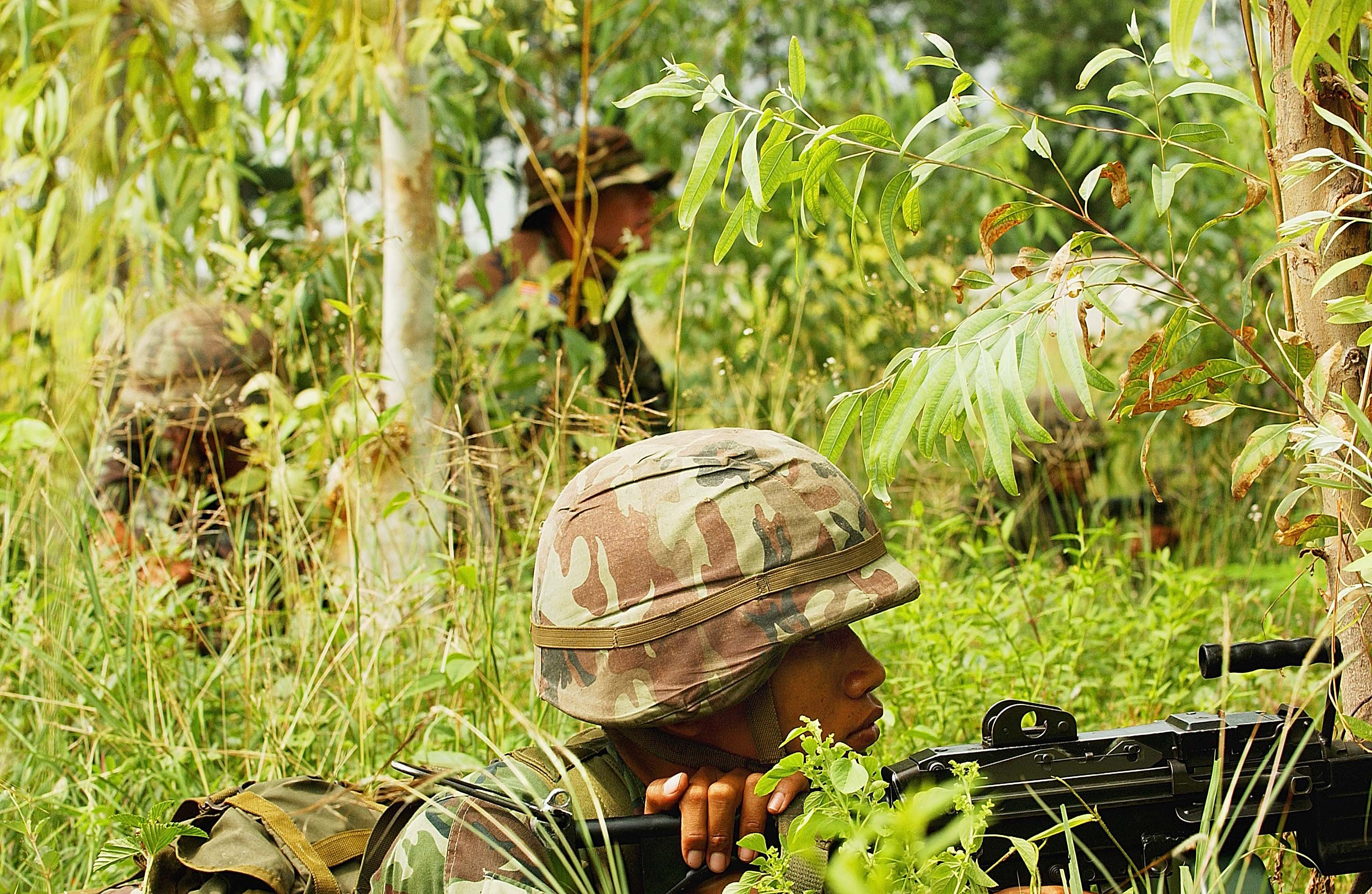
Thai and US Army Soldiers practice tactical manoeuvres during exercise Cobra Gold 2006 in Lop Buri.

==== Thai military deputized as police ====
On 29 March 2016, in a move that the Bangkok Post said will "...will inflict serious and long-term damage...", the NCPO, under a Section 44 order (NCPO Order 13/2559) signed by junta chief Prayut Chan-o-cha, granted to commissioned officers of the Royal Thai Armed Forces broad police powers to suppress and arrest anyone they suspect of criminal activity without a warrant and detain them secretly at almost any location without charge for up to seven days. Bank accounts can be frozen, and documents and property can be seized. Travel can be banned. Automatic immunity for military personnel has been built into the order, and there is no independent oversight or recourse in the event of abuse. The order came into immediate effect. The net result is that the military will have more power than the police and less oversight.

The government has stated that the purpose of this order is to enable military officers to render their assistance in an effort to "...suppress organized crimes such as extortion, human trafficking, child and labor abuses, gambling, prostitution, illegal tour guide services, price collusion, and firearms. It neither aims to stifle nor intimidate dissenting voices. Defendants in such cases will go through normal judicial process, with police as the main investigator...trial[s] will be conducted in civilian courts, not military ones. Moreover, this order does not deprive the right of the defendants to file complaints against military officers who have abused their power."

The NCPO said that the reason for its latest order is that there are simply not enough police, in spite of the fact that there are about 230,000 officers in the Royal Thai Police force. They make up about 17 percent of all non-military public servants. This amounts to 344 police officers for every for every 100,000 persons in Thailand, more than twice the ratio in Myanmar and the Philippines, one and a half times that of Japan and Indonesia and roughly the same proportion as the United States.

In a joint statement released on 5 April 2016, six groups, including Human Rights Watch (HRW), Amnesty International, and the International Commission of Jurists (ICJ), condemned the move.

==== Corruption ====
The Asia Sentinel in 2014 called the Thai military one of the most deeply corrupt militaries in Asia. The Thai armed forces have a history of procurement scandals and dodgy dealings dating back to at least the 1980s.

- In the 1980s, the army bought hundreds of substandard armored personnel carriers (APC) from the Chinese that were so shoddy that light was visible through the welds securing the armor plate.
- The Thai air force bought Chinese jets with short-lived engines so delicate that the planes were towed to the flight line for takeoff and towed back on landing in order to minimize engine hours.
- In 1997, the HTMS Chakri Naruebet aircraft carrier was commissioned. Due to its lackluster operational history, the Thai media have nicknamed the ship "Thai-tanic", and consider her to be a white elephant.
- The Aeros 40D S/N 21 airship, nicknamed "Sky Dragon", was purchased for 350 million baht in 2009. It cost 2.8 million baht to inflate and 280,000 baht a month to keep inflated. It served for eight years, mostly in storage, and crashed once. The present leadership of the NCPO was instrumental in approving its purchase.

== Weapons and equipment ==
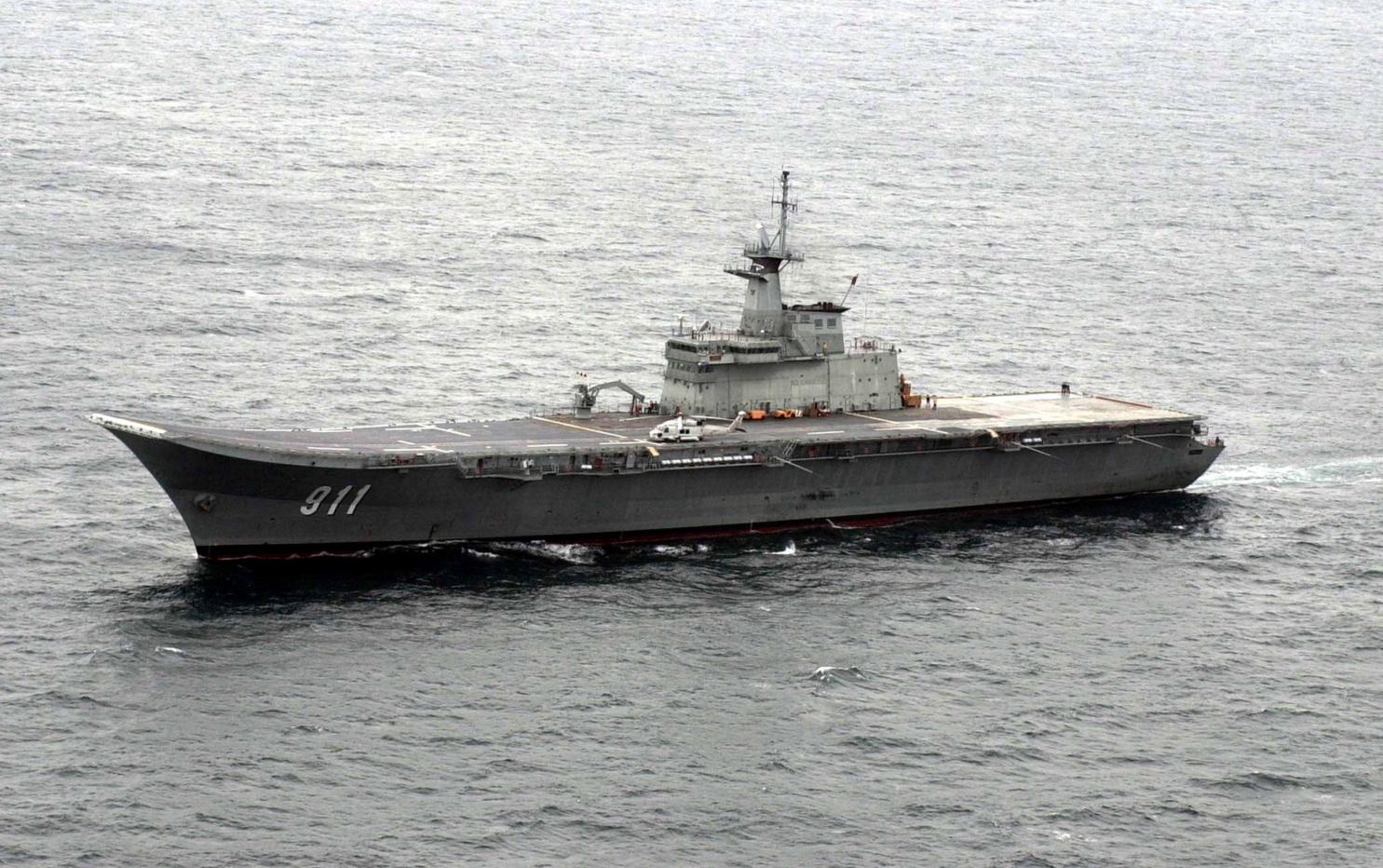
The aircraft carrier HTMS Chakri Naruebet of the Royal Thai Navy.

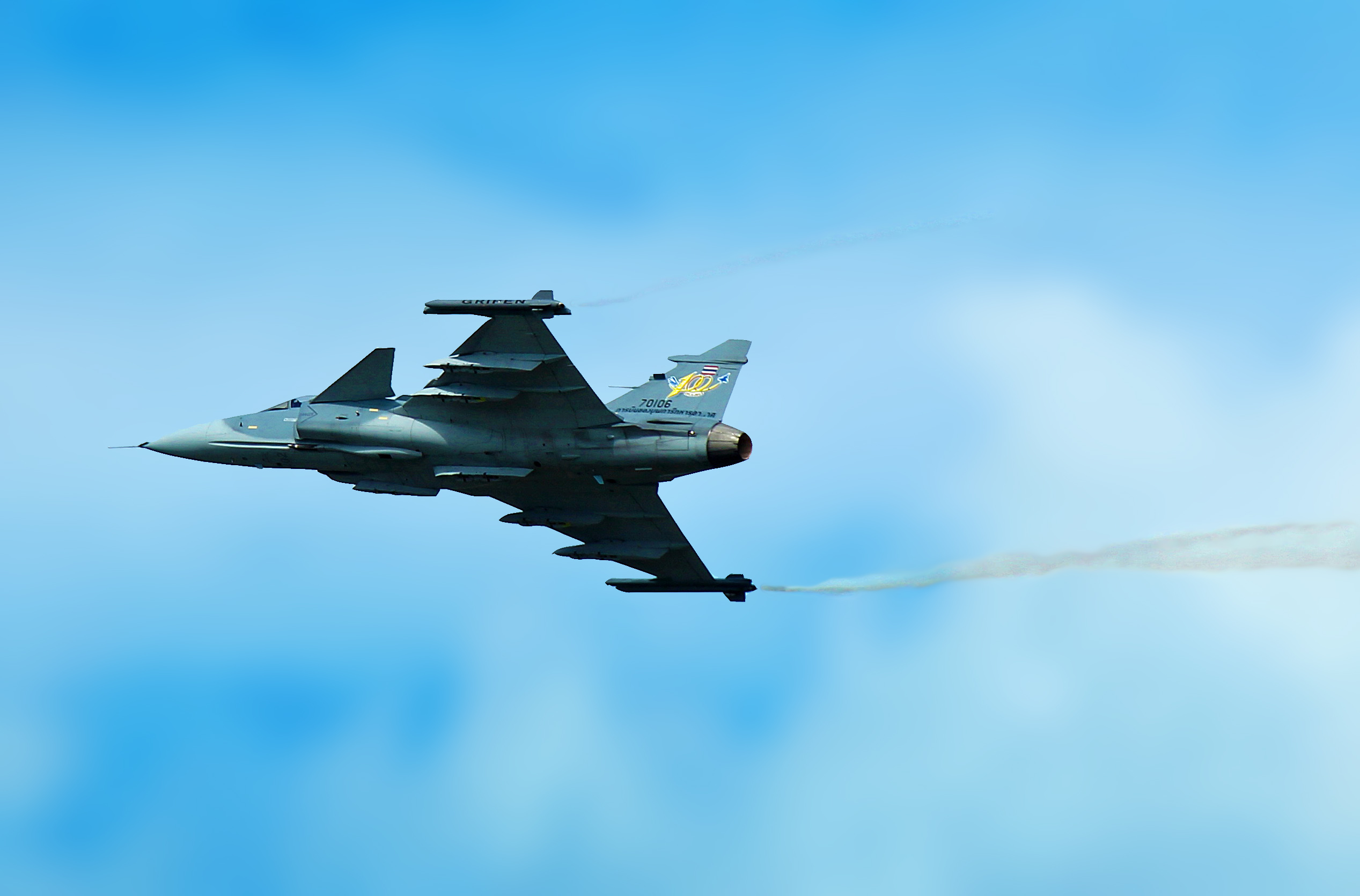
Saab JAS 39 Gripen of the Royal Thai Air Force.

Thailand's defense spending has soared since 2006. Since then the military has seized control from civilian governments on two occasions. Defense spending has increased by US$1 billion since the latest coup in 2014.

Equipment	Quantity	In service	On order
Main battle tank and light tank	705	705	0
APCs, IFVs, ARVs, LCVs	2620	2620	300
Self-propelled artillery	1072	1072	60
Combat warplanes	183	179	0
Transport warplanes	114	114	0
Training warplanes	56	55	12
Military helicopters	282	282	25
Aircraft carriers	1	1	0
Warships	17	17	2 LPD
Fast attack craft – missile (FAC-M)s	6	6	6
Submarines	0	0	3
Patrol boats	127	127	2

== Uniforms, ranks, insignia ==
To build institutional solidarity and esprit de corps, each Thai service component has developed its own distinctive uniforms, ranking system, and insignia. Many Thai military uniforms reflect historical foreign influences. For example, most of the distinctive service uniforms were patterned on those of the US, but lower ranking enlisted navy personnel wear uniforms resembling those of their French counterparts. The early influence of British advisers to the Thai royal court and the historical role of the military in royal pomp and ceremony contributed to the splendor of formal dress uniforms worn by high-ranking officers and guards of honour on ceremonial occasions.

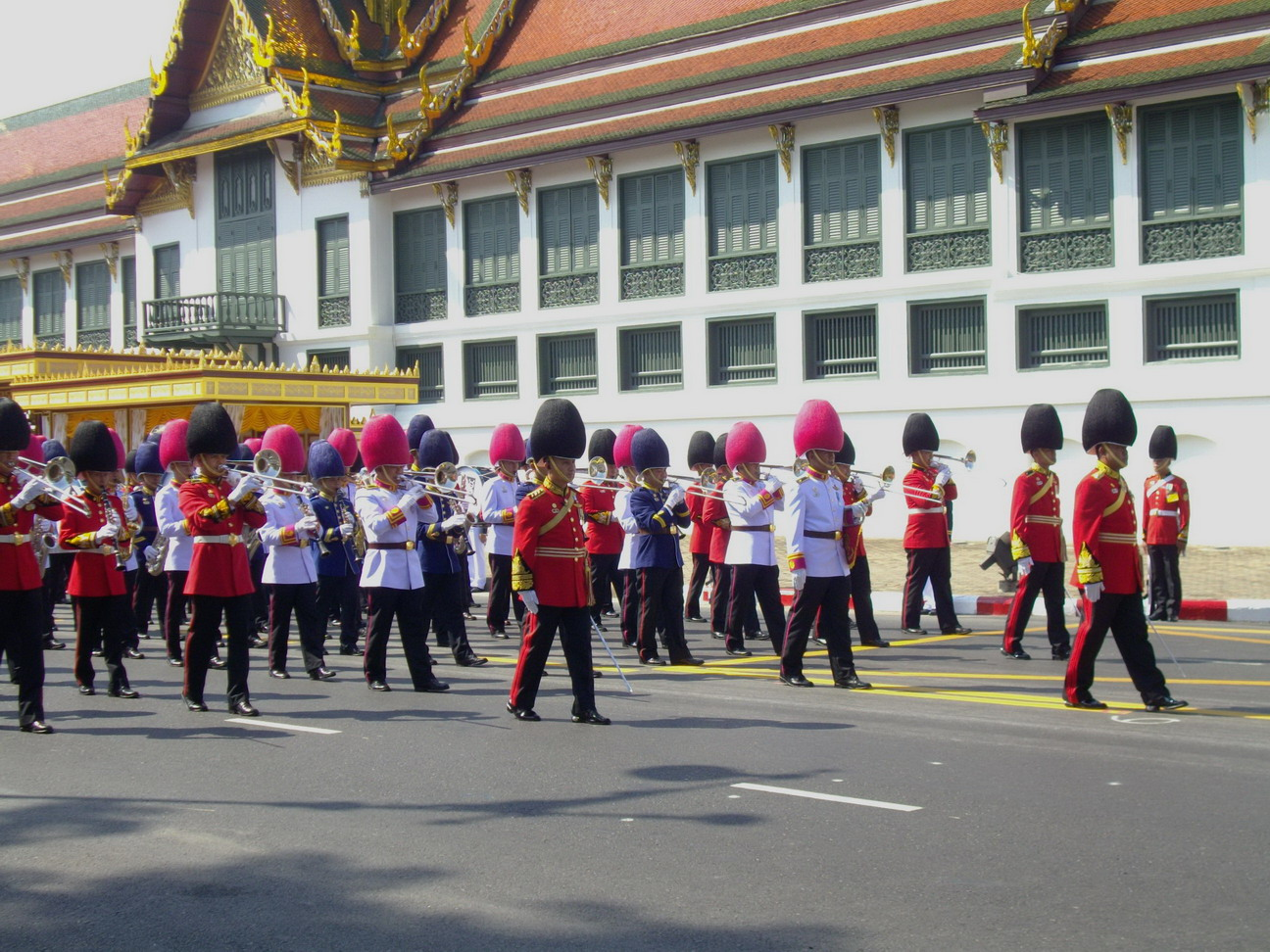
The Royal Thai Army Band in uniforms of various royal guards unit, ranked in the shape of the flag of Thailand

The rank structures of the three armed services are similar to those of the respective branches of the US Armed Forces, although the Thai system has fewer NCO and warrant officer designations. The king, as head of state and constitutional head of the armed forces, commissions all officers. Appointments to NCO ranks are authorised by the minister of defence. In theory, the authority and responsibilities of officers of various ranks correspond to those of their US counterparts. However, because of a perennial surplus of senior officers—in 1987 there were some 600 generals and admirals in a total force of about 273,000—Thai staff positions are often held by officers of higher rank than would be the case in the US or other Western military establishments.

Thai military personnel are highly conscious of rank distinctions and of the duties, obligations, and benefits they entail. Relationships among officers of different grades and among officers, NCOs, and the enlisted ranks are governed by military tradition in a society where observance of differences in status are highly formalised. The social distance between officers and NCOs is widened by the fact that officers usually are college or military academy graduates, while most NCOs have not gone beyond secondary school. There is a wider gap between officers and conscripts, most of whom have even less formal education, service experience, or specialised training.

Formal honours and symbols of merit occupy an important place in Thai military tradition. The government grants numerous awards, and outstanding acts of heroism, courage, and meritorious service receive prompt recognition.

=== Officer and enlisted rank insignia ===
Rank group	General / flag officers				Senior officers			Junior officers
Royal Thai Army
Royal Thai Army	จอมพล; Chom phon	พลเอก; Phon ek	พลโท; Phon tho	พลตรี Phon tri	พันเอก; Phan ek	พันโท; Phan tho	พันตรี Phan tri	ร้อยเอก; Roi ek	ร้อยโท; Roi tho	ร้อยตรี Roi tri
Royal Thai Navy
Royal Thai Navy	จอมพลเรือ; Chom phon ruea	พลเรือเอก; Phon ruea ek	พลเรือโท; Phon ruea tho	พลเรือตรี Phon ruea tri	นาวาเอก; Nawa ek	นาวาโท; Nawa tho	นาวาตรี Nawa tri	เรือเอก; Ruea ek	เรือโท; Ruea tho	เรือตรี Ruea tri
Royal Thai Air Force
Royal Thai Air Force	จอมพลอากาศ; Chom phon akat	พลอากาศเอก; Phon akat ek	พลอากาศโท; Phon akat tho	พลอากาศตรี Phon akat tri	นาวาอากาศเอก; Nawa akat ek	นาวาอากาศโท; Nawa akat tho	นาวาอากาศตรี Nawa akat tri	เรืออากาศเอก; Ruea akat ek	เรืออากาศโท; Ruea akat tho	เรืออากาศตรี Ruea akat tri

Rank group	Senior NCOs				Junior NCOs		Enlisted
Royal Thai Army							No insignia
Royal Thai Army	จ่าสิบเอก; Cha sip ek	จ่าสิบโท; Cha sip tho	จ่าสิบตรี Cha sip tri	สิบเอก; Sip ek	สิบโท; Sip tho	สิบตรี Sip tri	พลทหาร; Phon thahan
Royal Thai Navy							No insignia
Royal Thai Navy	พันจ่าเอก; Phan cha ek	พันจ่าโท; Phan cha tho	พันจ่าตรี Phan cha tri	จ่าเอก; Cha ek	จ่าโท; Cha tho	จ่าตรี Cha tri	พลทหาร; Phon thahan
Royal Thai Air Force							No insignia
Royal Thai Air Force	พันจ่าอากาศเอก; Phan cha akat ek	พันจ่าอากาศโท; Phan cha akat tho	พันจ่าอากาศตรี Phan cha akat tri	จ่าอากาศเอก; Cha akat ek	จ่าอากาศโท; Cha akat tho	จ่าอากาศตรี Cha akat tri	พลทหาร; Phon thahan

== Gallery ==
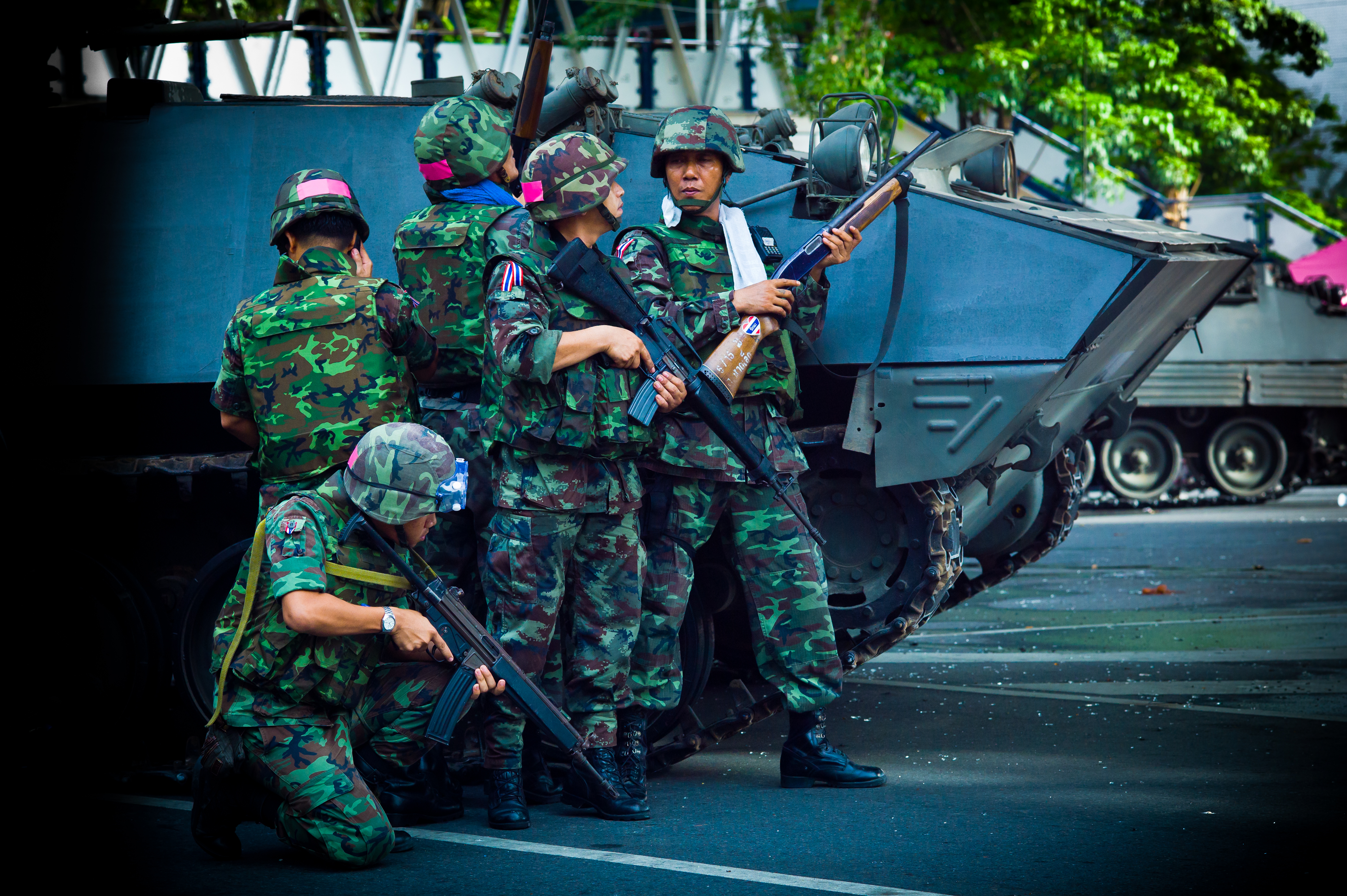
RTA troops take cover next to a Type 85 AFV near the Red Shirt barricade at Chulalongkorn Hospital

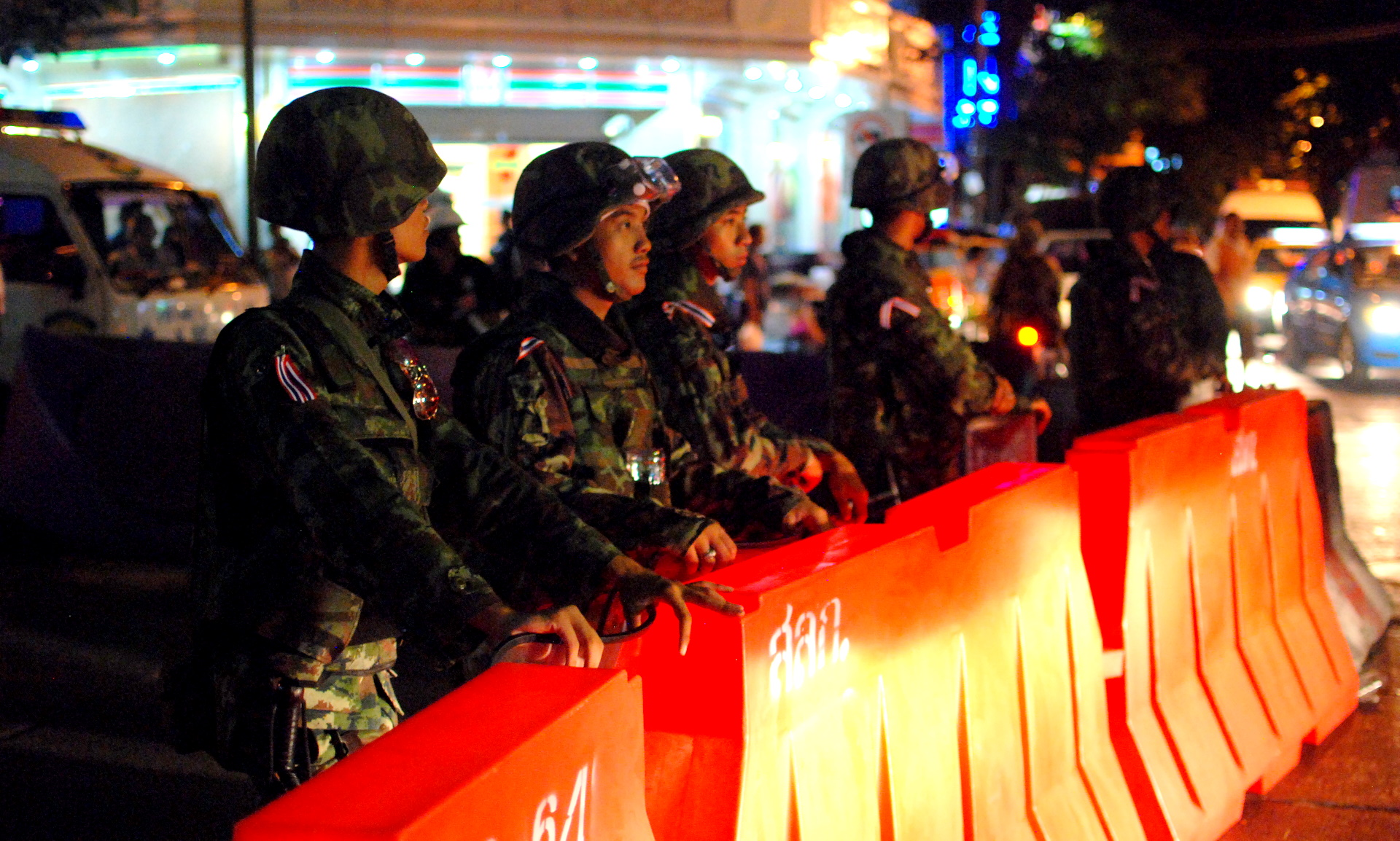
Soldiers with riot shields at a barricade on Silom Road and Soi Convent

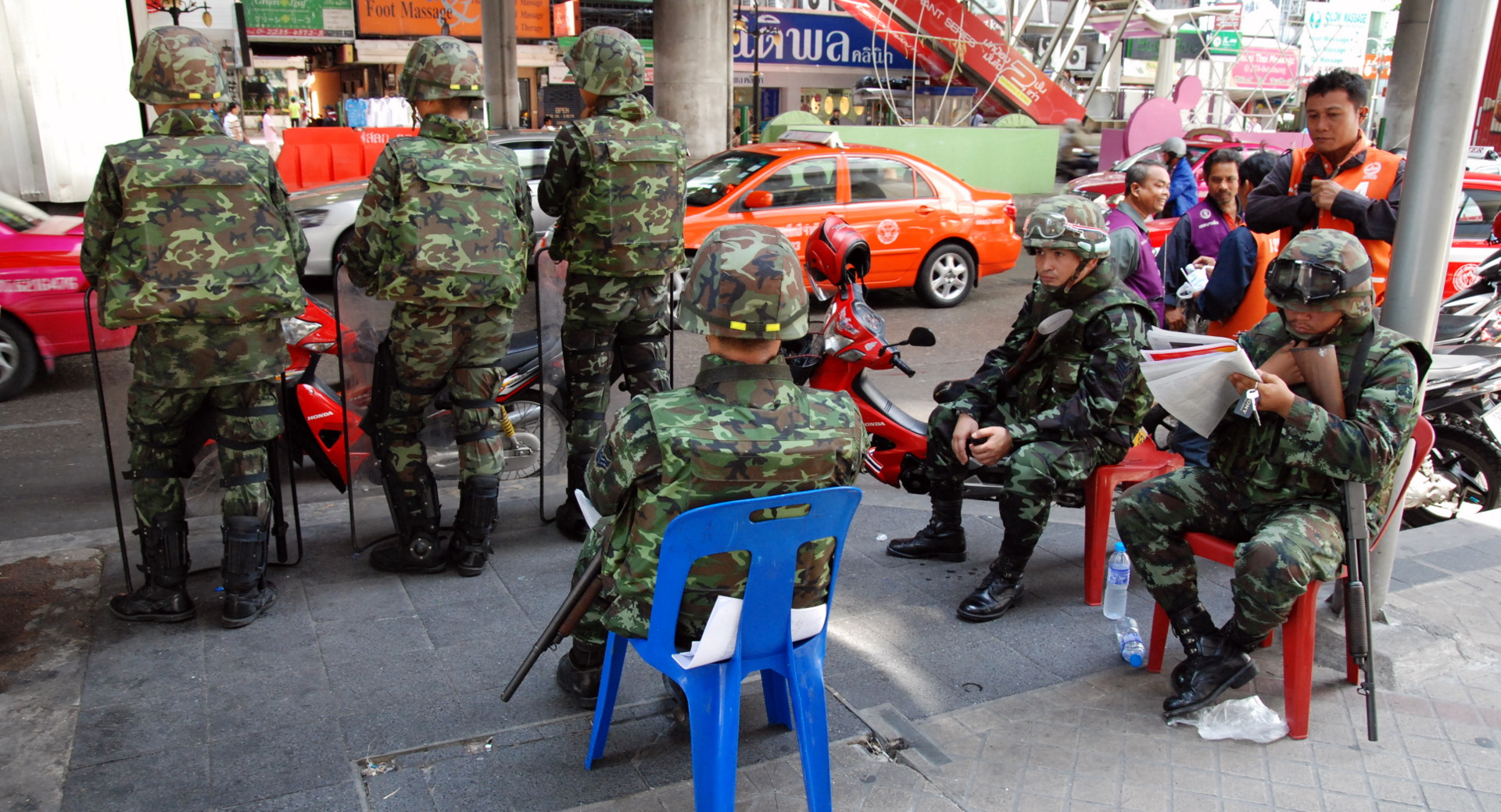
Soldiers beneath Saladaeng BTS station, Silom Road

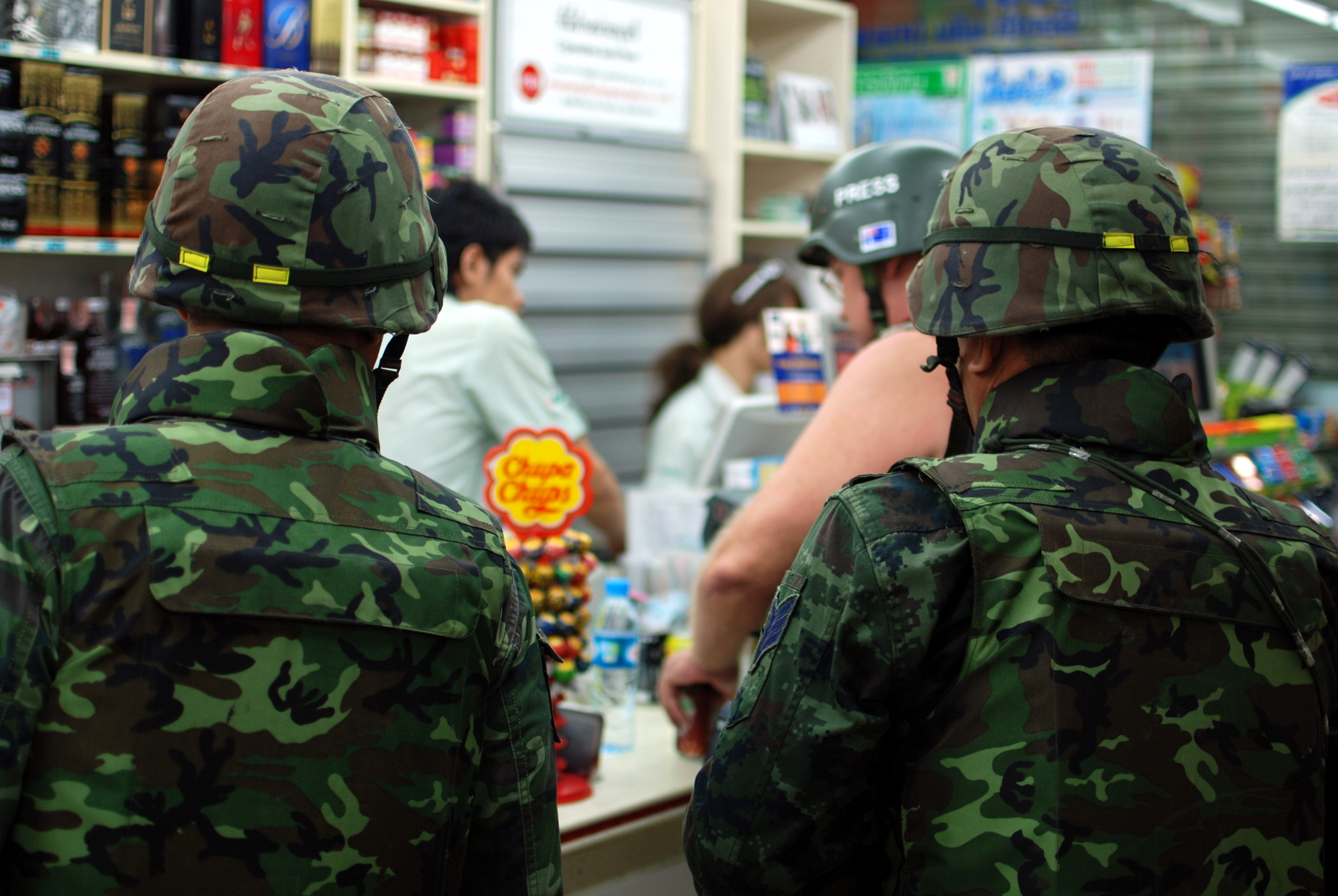
Soldiers and a helmeted journalist buy water and food, Silom Road

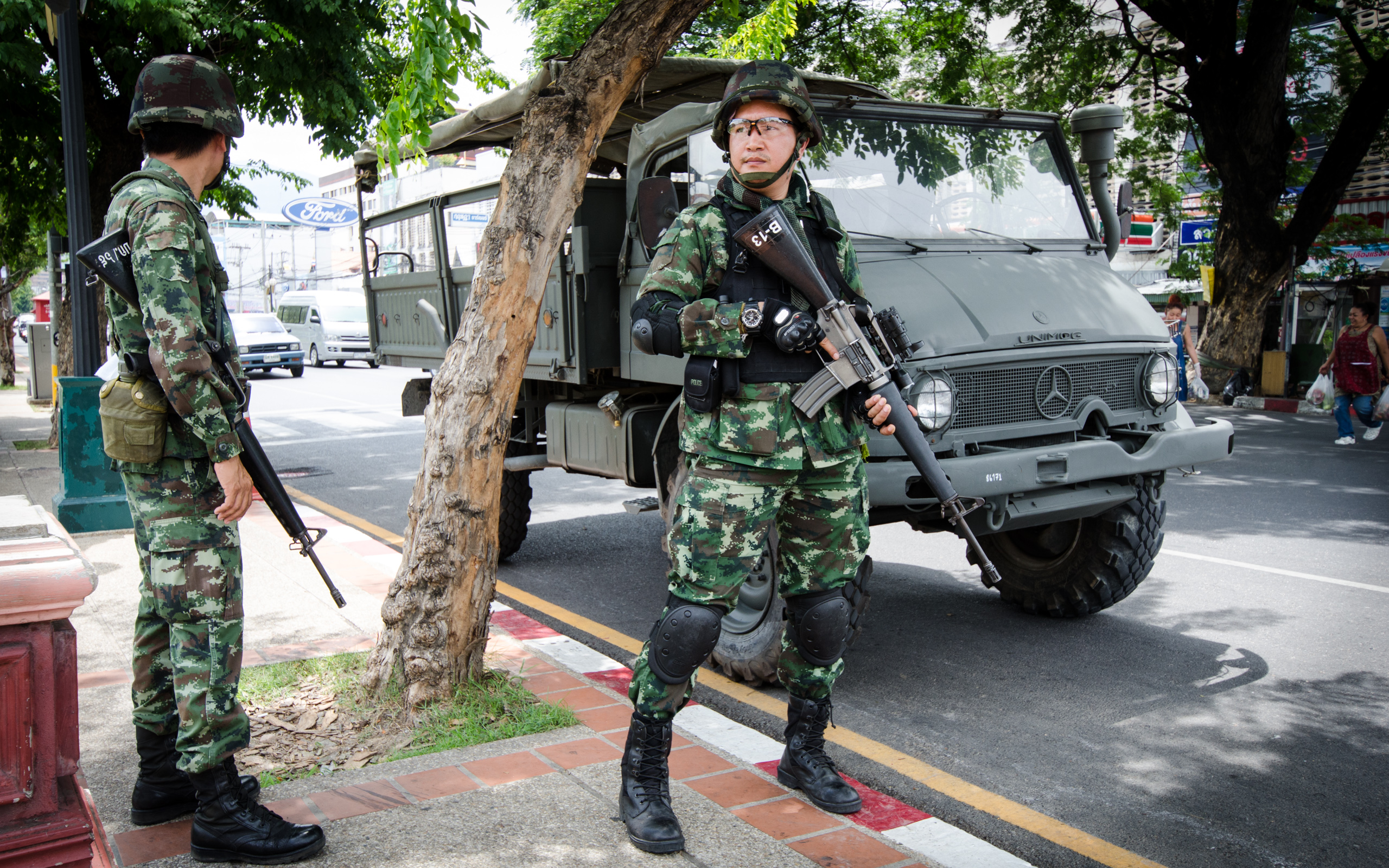
Troops at Chang Phueak Gate, Chiang Mai, days after the 2014 Thai coup d'état

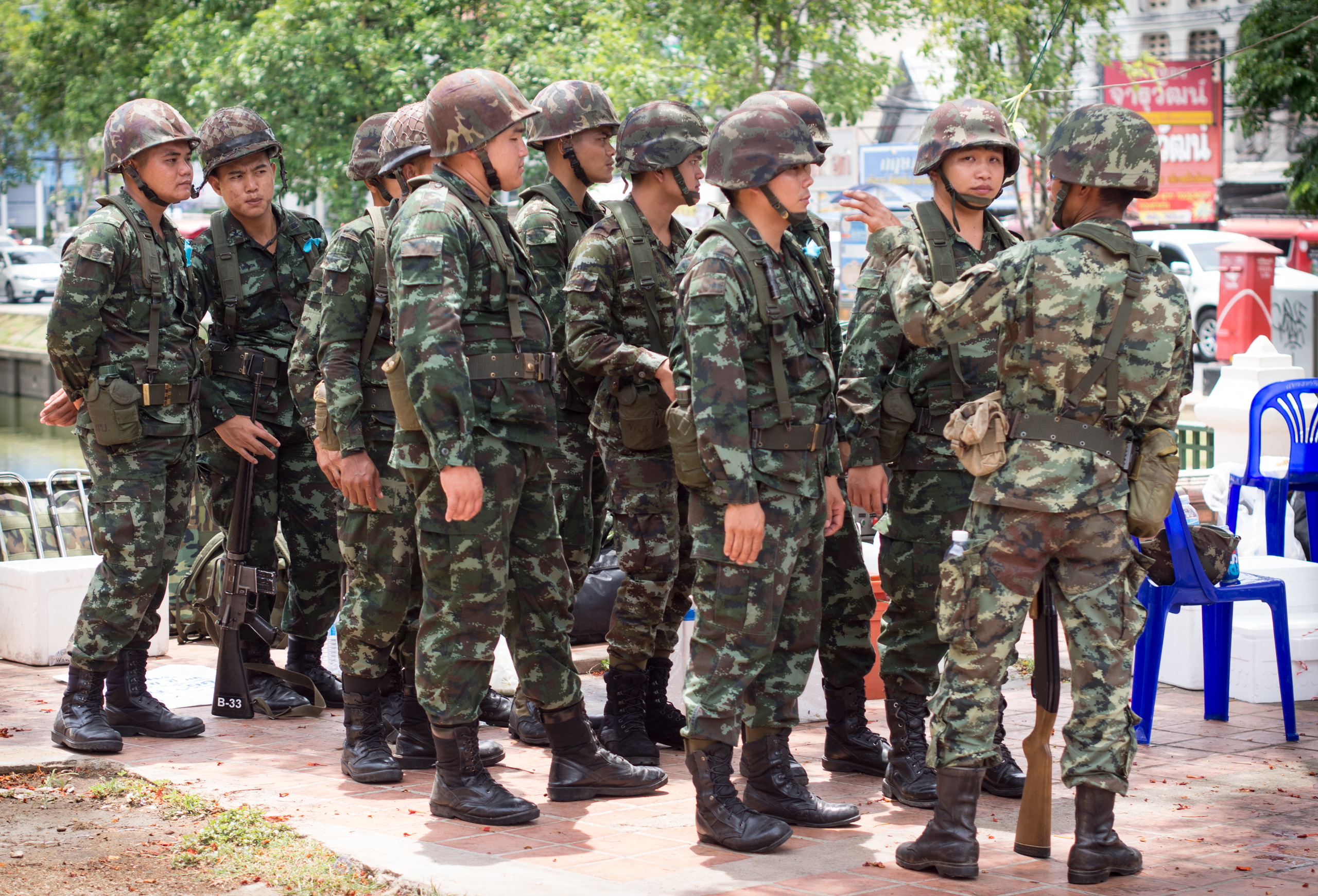
Troops at Chang Phueak Gate, Chiang Mai

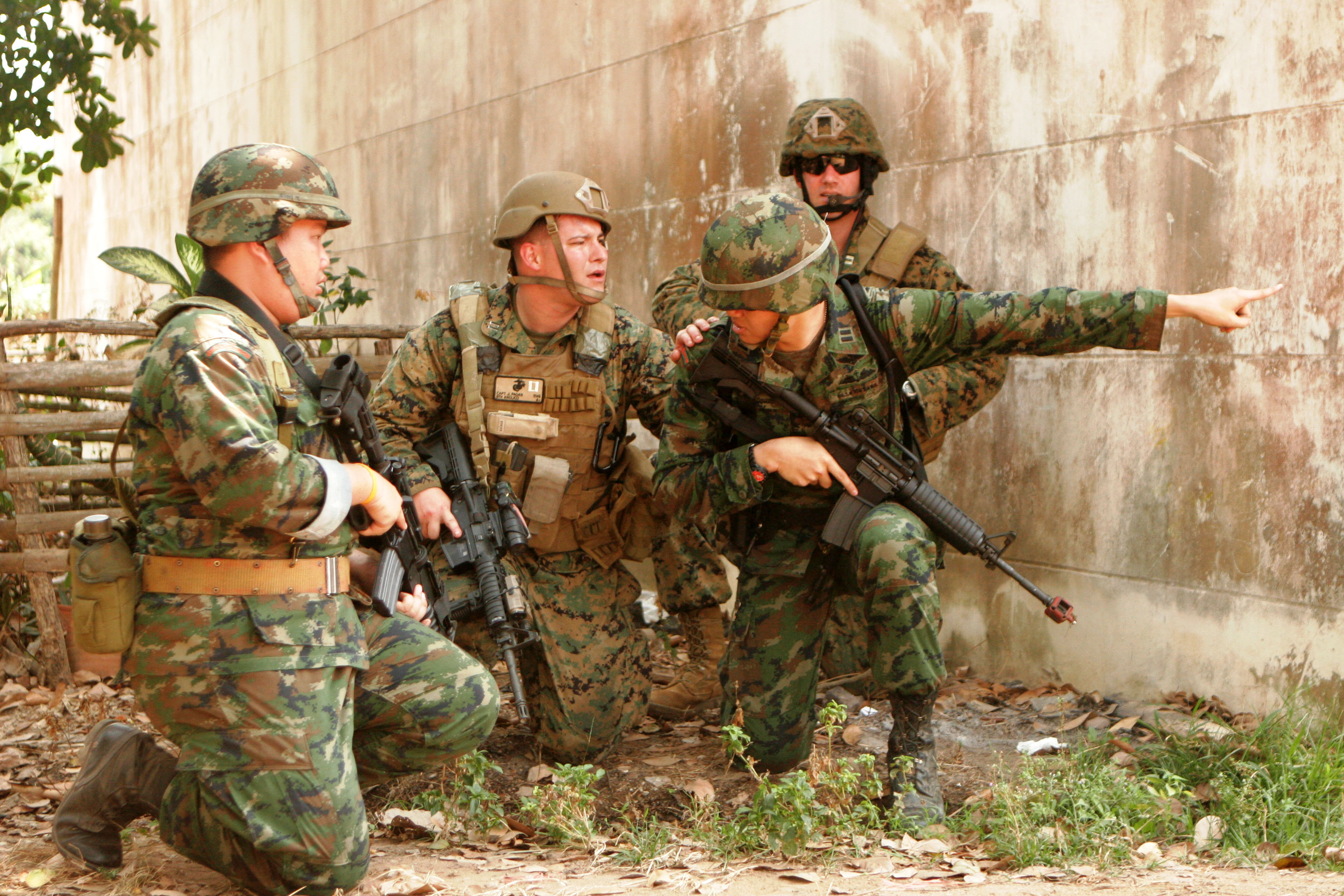
Royal Thai and US Marines eliminating hostile forces during a mock raid, 11 February 2011

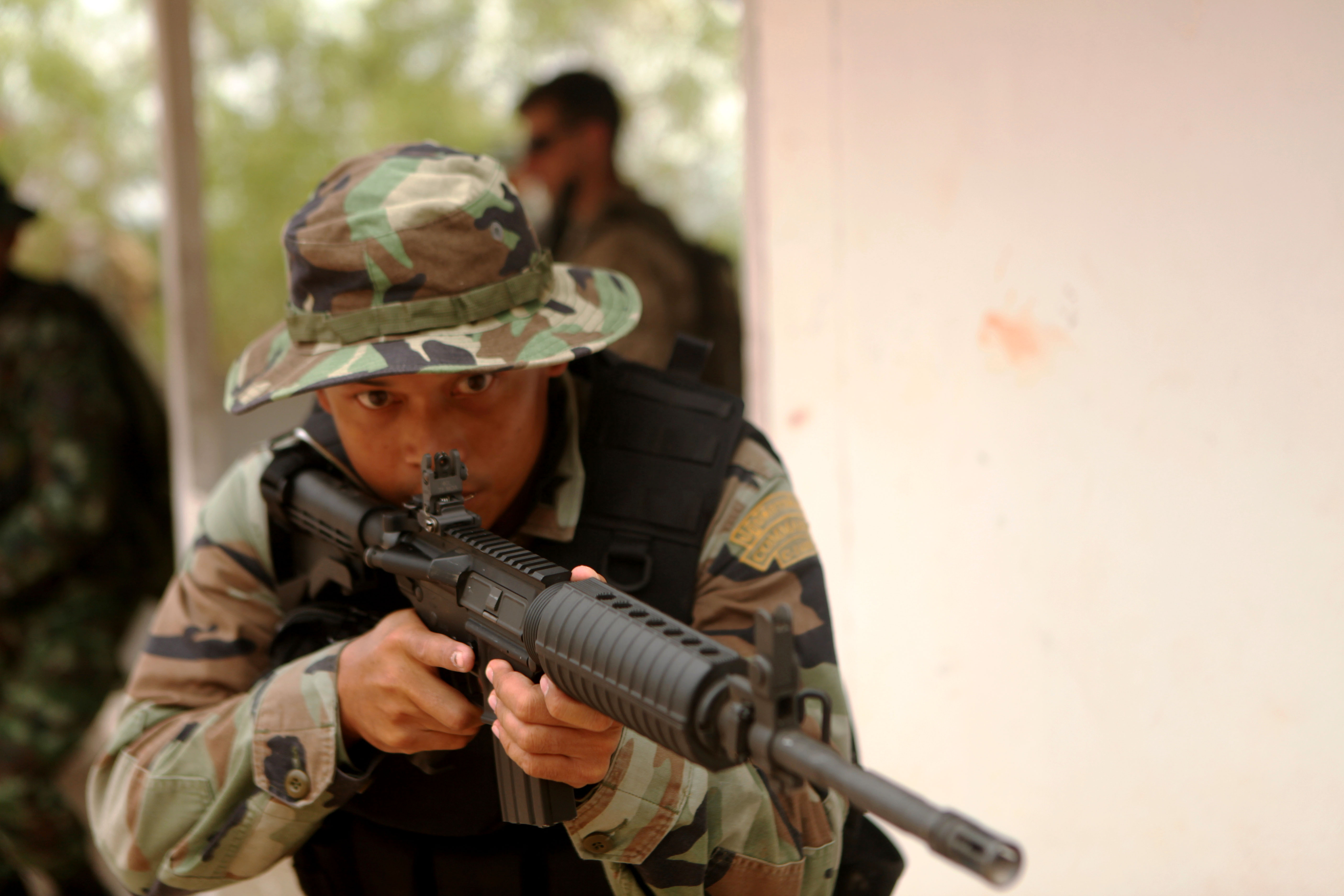
Royal Thai Special Forces service member clears a building during a mock raid, Cobra Gold, 2011

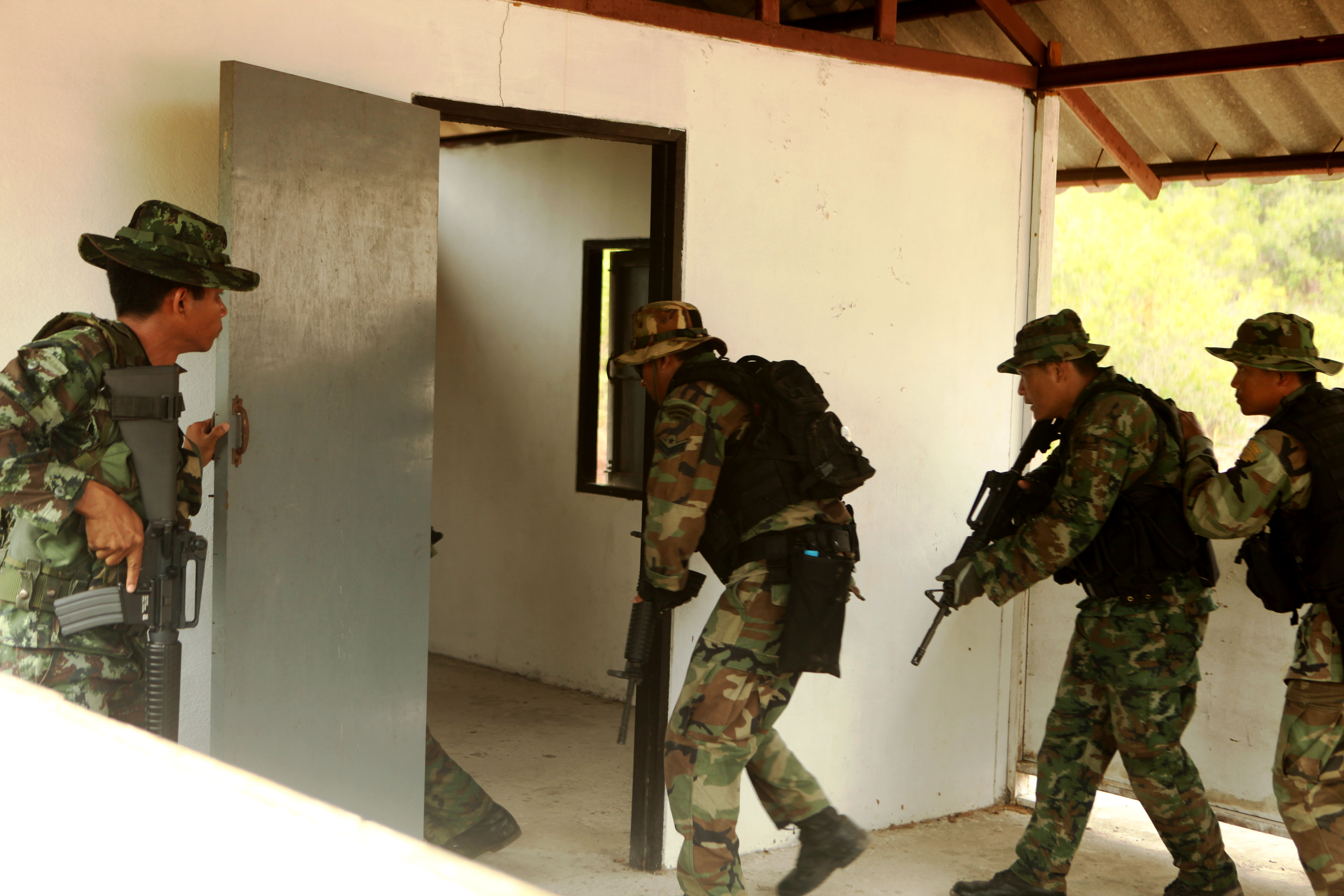
Royal Thai Special Forces clear a building during a mock raid, Cobra Gold, 2011

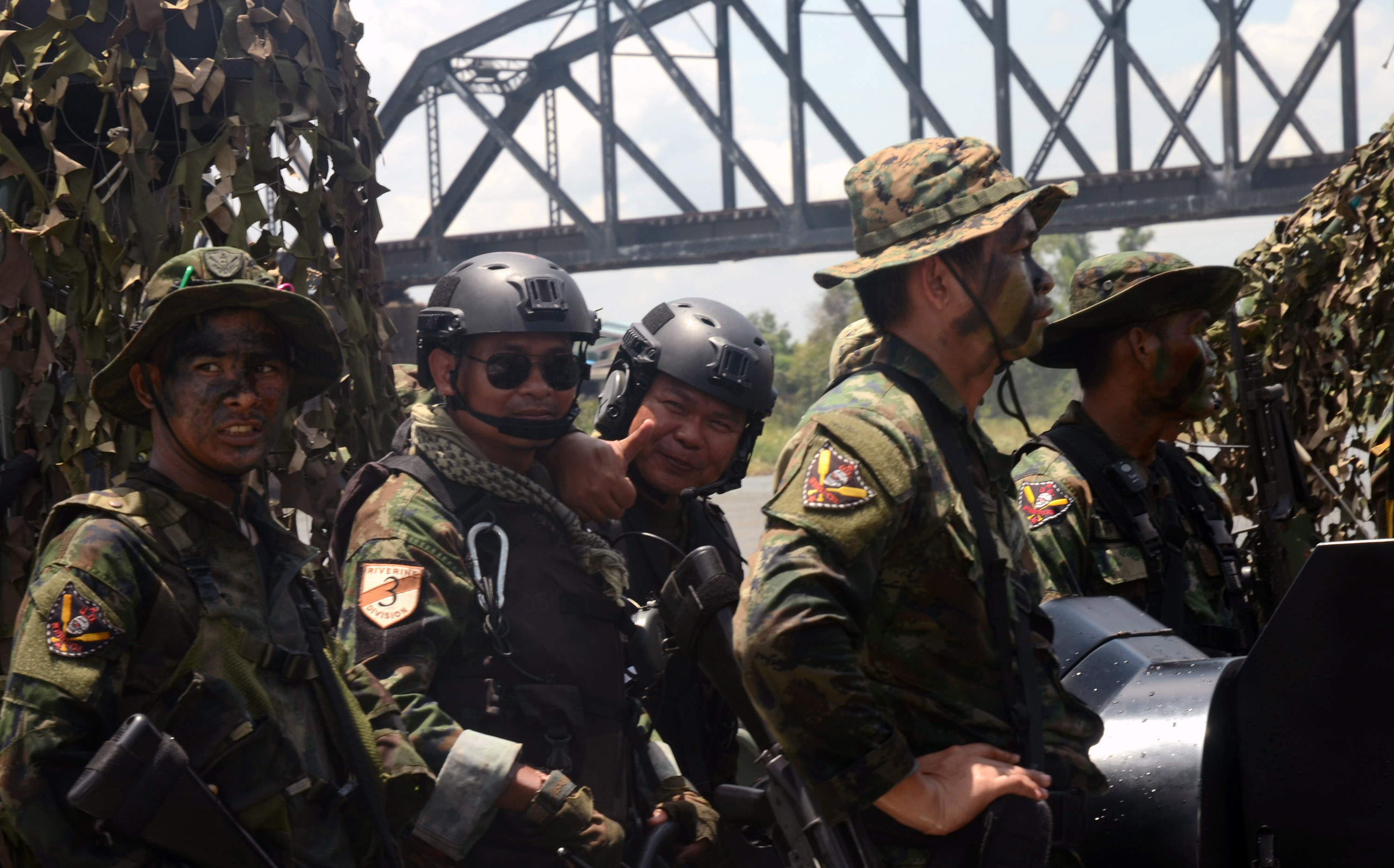
Thai troops in a riverine exercise with US sailors on the Nakhon Nayok River, Cooperation Afloat Readiness and Training (CARAT), 8 June 2013

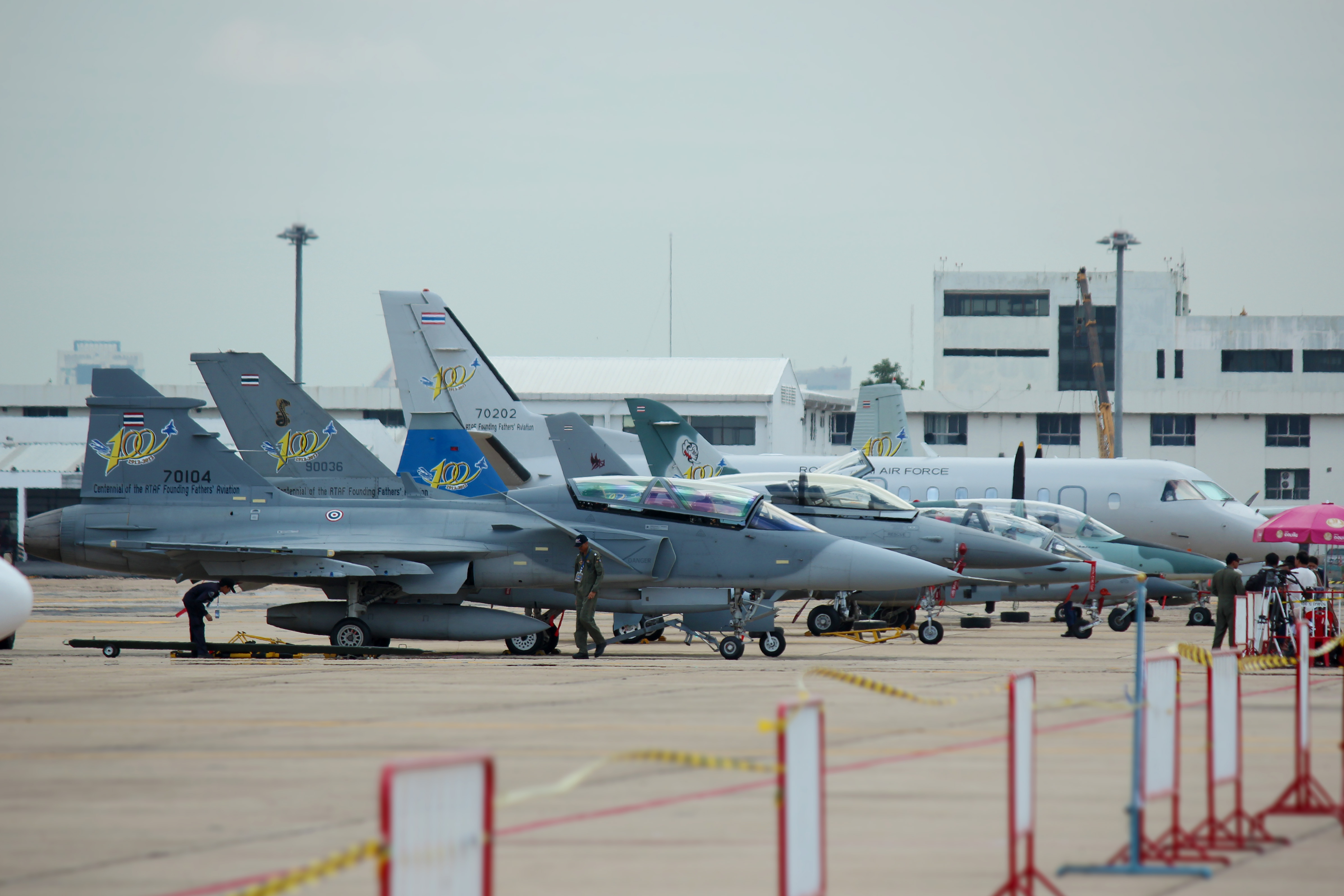
RTAF fighters: JAS 39 Gripen, F-16 ADF, F-5, Alpha jet, L-39 and SAAB-340

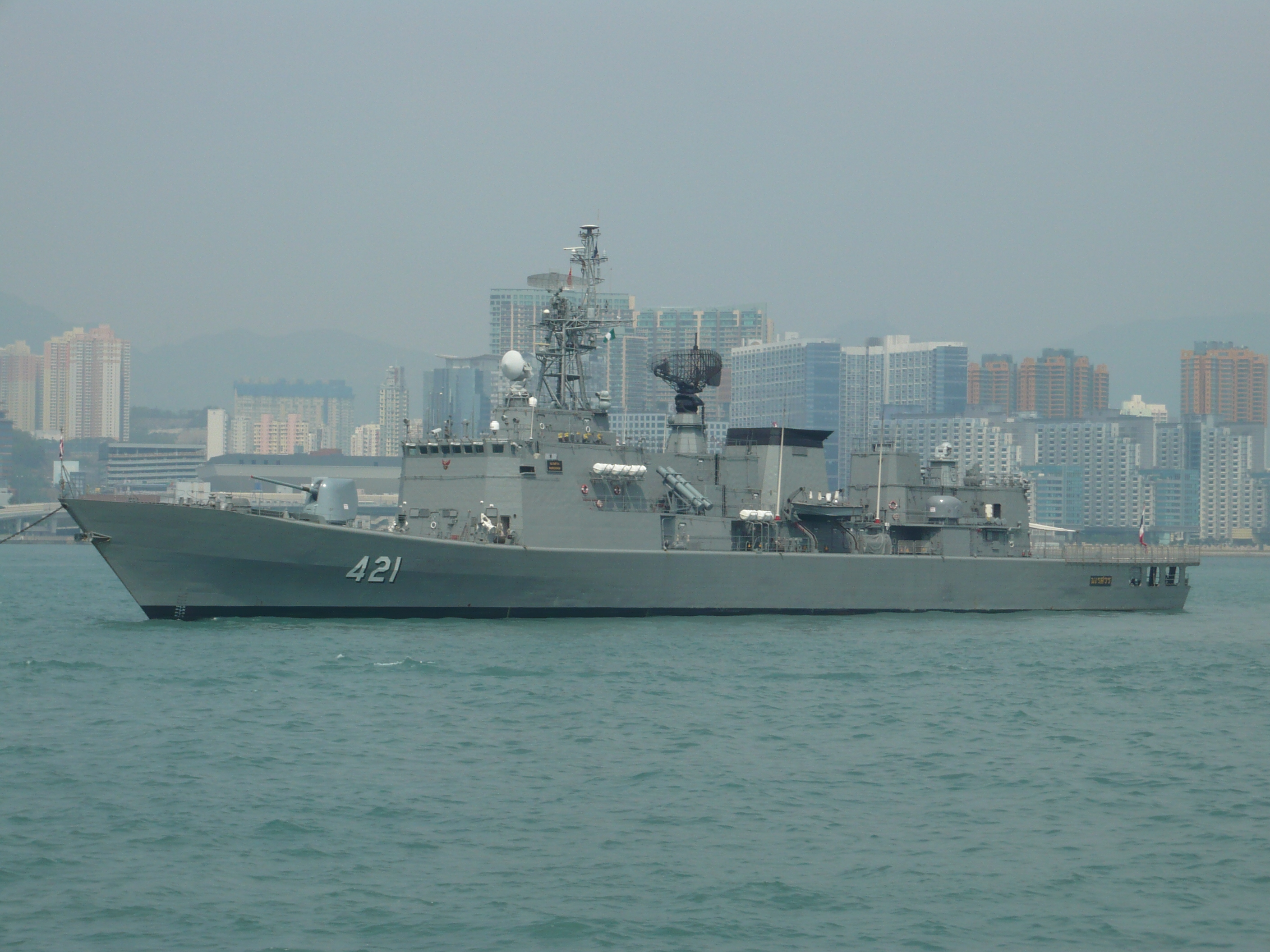
RTN frigate HTMS Naresuan FFG-421 moored in Victoria Harbour, Hong Kong

== See also ==
- Border Patrol Police
- King's Guard (Thailand)
- List of flags of the Royal Thai Armed Forces
- Military ranks of the Thai armed forces
- Royal Thai Air Force
- Royal Thai Police
- Territorial Defence Student
- Thahan Phran
- Underwater Demolition Assault Unit
- Volunteer Defense Corps (Thailand)
