= OYAK =

Turkish pension fund

- Type: Pension fund
- Traded as: BIST: OYYAT
- Founded: 1 March 1961; 65 years ago
- Headquarters: Ankara, Turkey
- Products: Financial services
- Revenue: US$16.35 billion (2023)
- Total assets: US$30.25 billion (2023)
- Number of employees: 38,796
- Parent: Turkish Ministry of National; Defense
- Website: www.oyak.com.tr

Ordu Yardımlaşma Kurumu (OYAK) (English: Military Solidarity Institution), is a Turkish charity and military pension fund with around 470,000 members. The OYAK Holding Investment Subsidiary Group is one of the largest industrial groups in Turkey.

The group was the former owner of ING Oyak Bank, sold to ING Bank in 2007, and the Oypa supermarket chain. In 2012, it was rated BB+/stable by Standard & Poor's. The group co-owns car manufacturer Oyak-Renault and steel producer Erdemir. OYAK Group of Companies added Sagra to its structure in April 2021. OYAK is on the global coal exit list published by Urgewald because it owns İsken Sugözü power station.

OYAK is a private entity that is subject to Turkish civic and commercial law. OYAK, also offers services such as consumer loans, housing loans, pension system, stock market investment support to its members.

OYAK provides members with supplementary retirement benefits apart from the official retirement fund, Emekli Sandığı and SSK, to which they are primarily affiliated. In addition to retirement benefits, OYAK pays disability benefits to members when they become partially or fully disabled, and provides death benefits to the deceased's heirs.

== Structure ==
=== OYAK Group companies ===
In the industrial sector, the OYAK Group companies include iron and steel, chemistry, cement manufacturing, electricity and automotive.

- OYAK Mining Metallurgy Group
- OYAK Cement Concrete Paper Group
- OYAK Automotive Logistics Group
- OYAK Finance Group
- OYAK Construction Group
- OYAK Chemical Agriculture Group
- OYAK Energy Group
- OYAK Food Group

=== Affiliated companies ===
Affiliated companies and investments include:

- OYAK Construction (Turkish: OYAK İnşaat), founded 1982, in Turkey
- OYAK Yatırım Ortaklığı AŞ: Investment company, part-floated on the Istanbul Stock Exchange as OYAYO.IS
- Oyak-Renault (49% share)
- OYAK Securities (Turkish: OYAK Yatırım), founded 1982
- Erdemir, acquired in 2005

== Companies Traded on Borsa Istanbul ==
- OYYAT - OYAK Yatırım Menkul Değerler A.Ş.
- ISDMR - İskenderun Demir ve Çelik A.Ş.
- OYAKC - OYAK Çimento Fabrikaları A.Ş.
- HEKTS - Hektaş Ticaret T.A.Ş.
- OYAYO - OYAK Yatırım Ortaklığı A.Ş
- OYYAT - OYAK Yatırım Menkul Değerler A.Ş.
- OYAK ANKER Bank
