= Oypa =

Former Turkish supermarket chain

Oyak Marketing Services A.Ş.
- Native name: Oyak Pazarlamacılık Hizmetleri A.Ş.
- Company type: Anonim Şirket
- Industry: Retail
- Founded: March 19, 1963; 63 years ago
- Defunct: October 9, 2002; 23 years ago
- Headquarters: Istanbul, Turkey
- Number of locations: 21 (2001)
- Areas served: Turkey
- Key people: Dinç Kızıldemir (CEO)
- Services: Supermarket
- Parent: Oyak; Koç Holding; Moonlight Capital

Oypa (Oyak Pazarlamacılık Hizmetleri A.Ş., OYPA Oyak Büyük Mağazacılık Ticaret A.Ş.) was a chain of supermarkets in Turkey. The company was owned by Koç Holding, which also owned the Migros Türk chain before selling it to Moonlight Capital. It was formerly owned by Oyak, the Armed Forces Pension Fund.

== History ==
=== Military cooperative ===
Oypa was founded as a military cooperative Ordu Pazarı (Military Market), on 19 March 1963 in Tandoğan Square, Ankara, by OYAK (Ordu Yardımlaşma Kurumu) to support the 1st Army Command of the Turkish Armed Forces. The chain was established to serve the needs of Turkish Armed Forces personnel and their families. Access to shopping privileges was granted through a special membership card called the Ordu Pazarı Giriş Kartı (Army Market Pass).

=== Supermarket ===
On 30 May 1997, the name of the organization was changed to Oypa, marking its transition to a more commercial and civilian-oriented retail operation. The rebranded chain expanded its services to the general public and focused on becoming a recognizable consumer brand. However, following decisions made during the OYAK General Assembly meetings held on October 5–6, 2002, Oypa ceased its operations. Subsequently, many of its store locations were acquired by major retailers Migros and Gima.

== Operations ==
At its peak in the early 2000s, Oypa operated 21 stores in 15 provinces across Turkey. In 2001, Oypa served a total of 11 million customers, with an average daily footfall of 30,000 shoppers. The company was formerly headed by General Manager Dinç Kızıldemir. Operating across Turkey, Oypa managed a total retail space of 65,822 square meters. In an effort to offer additional savings to its customers, the company introduced a loyalty card known as the Gülen Kart.
