= Military cooperative =

Organization providing goods to personnel

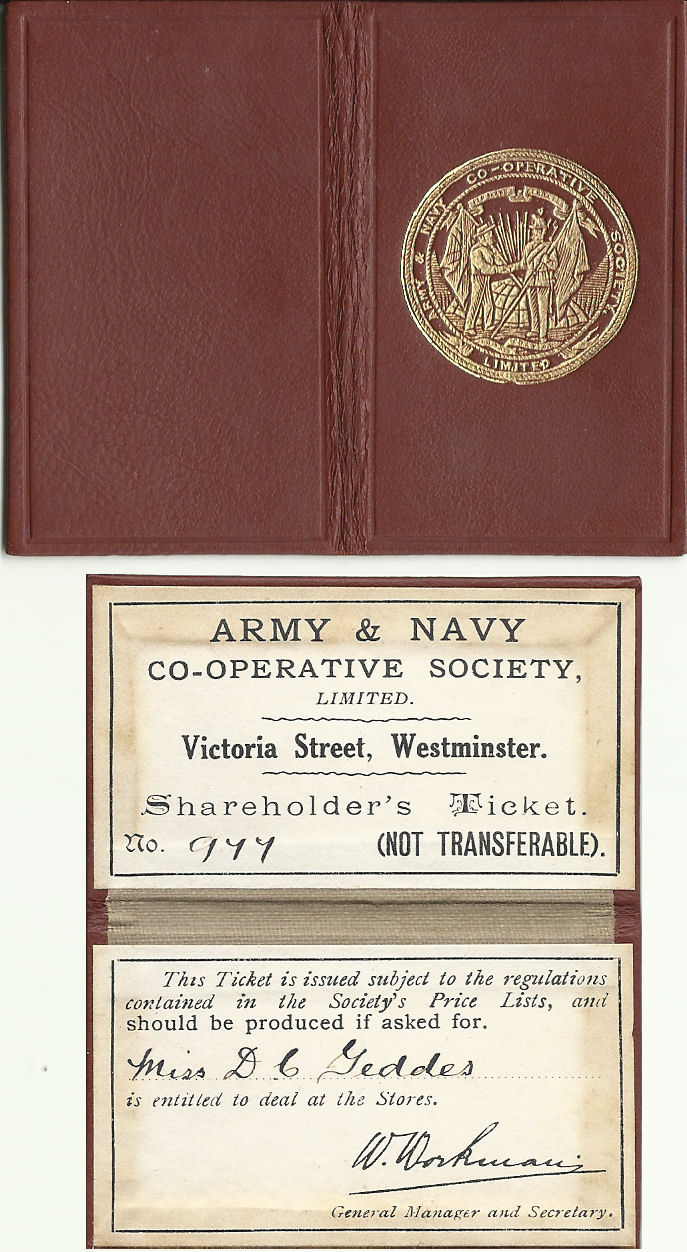
A shareholder's ticket for the British Army & Navy Co-operative Society

A military cooperative is an organization that provides service members with products at a low profit margin and protects them from profiteering. Such organisations were popular in a number of countries, particularly in the 19th and early 20th centuries.

Among others, they were popular in Poland in the interwar period. In the United Kingdom the Army & Navy Co-operative Society was founded in 1871 but ceased to be a cooperative in 1934, becoming a provincial department store. The Canteen and Mess Co-operative Society, founded in 1894, operated canteens on a cooperative basis until absorbed into a government body during the First World War. This later developed into the Navy, Army and Air Force Institutes (NAAFI) which continues to provide services to the British military.

== Purpose and functions ==
A military cooperative is a form of cooperative movement aimed at providing equipment and supply to the military personnel. Such cooperatives aim to supply soldiers with all kinds of products; in peacetime, they are also supposed to defend soldiers against exploitation. Military cooperative stores usually have low profit margins as they sell goods at preferential prices to the eligible customers.

== By country ==
=== Australia ===
The Army and Air Force Canteen Service (AAFCANS) was established in 1915 as the Army Canteen Service. It is a not-for-profit Commonwealth statutory body that operates under the Defence Australia portfolio and is answerable to the Minister for Defence, the Minister for Defence Personnel and the Chiefs of Defence, Army and Air Force. It provides goods, facilities, and services to or for the entertainment and recreation of designated members of the Australian Defence Force community.

=== Jordan ===
Military cooperatives have been described as existing in Jordan around the late 20th/early 21st century.

=== Poland ===
The first military cooperatives in Poland appeared in the aftermath of World War I in 1918. The Polish military started to regulate those institutions shortly afterwards when in November 1920, General Leon Berbecki issued an order defining a typical statue of a military cooperative. A month later, General Edward Śmigły-Rydz gave an order to his subordinate units to create military cooperatives, which contributed to a significant increase in this type of activity in the recently recreated Polish Army. In 1922 rules for military cooperatives were codified by the Polish Ministry of the Interior. Initially, Polish military cooperatives had multiple functions, with some specializing in financial aids, others in activities like house construction or publishing. After a few years, however, virtually all remaining cooperatives focused on food distribution and supply.

By 1928, there were about 300 such institutions in the Polish Army, many of them grouped under the Audit Union of Military Cooperatives (Związek Rewizyjny Spółdzielni Wojskowych). In 1936 there were about 240 remaining cooperatives in the Audit Union. Some Polish military cooperatives issued their own coinage, which is now considered a numismatic and militaria collectible.

After World War II, in the late 1940s, some military cooperatives were recreated in the People's Republic of Poland.

=== Thailand ===
Military cooperatives have been described as existing in Thailand in 2017.

=== Turkey ===
Oypa was in operation between 1963 and 2002.

=== United Kingdom ===
==== Army & Navy Co-operative Society ====
A 1924 advert for the society's stores

The Army & Navy Co-operative Society was founded on 15 September 1871 by a group of army and navy officers; it aimed to supply goods to servicemen at reduced rates and was modelled after the Civil Service Supply Association and the Civil Service Co-operative Society. The society opened shops in the United Kingdom and India but its trade suffered during the First World War. In 1934 the society ceased to be a cooperative, being incorporated as a limited company, and turned into a provincial department store. The company was purchased by House of Fraser in 1973.

==== Canteen and Mess Co-operative Society ====
The Canteen and Mess Co-operative Society was founded in 1894 by officers of the foot guards at Caterham Barracks. The society was registered under the Industrial and Provident Societies Act and affiliated with the Co-operative Union. The founding members were poorer officers and the society's aim was to supply officers at a better rate than the official canteen and with higher quality goods. The society's offices were in London; growth was slow initially but by 1900 the society turned over £265,000 a year. The Second Boer War affected the growth of the society but a War Office committee recommended the establishment of an army-wide Soldiers' Central Co-Operative society in 1902, this did not progress due to resistance from longer-serving commanding officers. The existing system of letting out canteens to private firms continued until the winter of 1913-14 when the Canteen Scandal revealed bribery in the system, which was subsequently reformed.

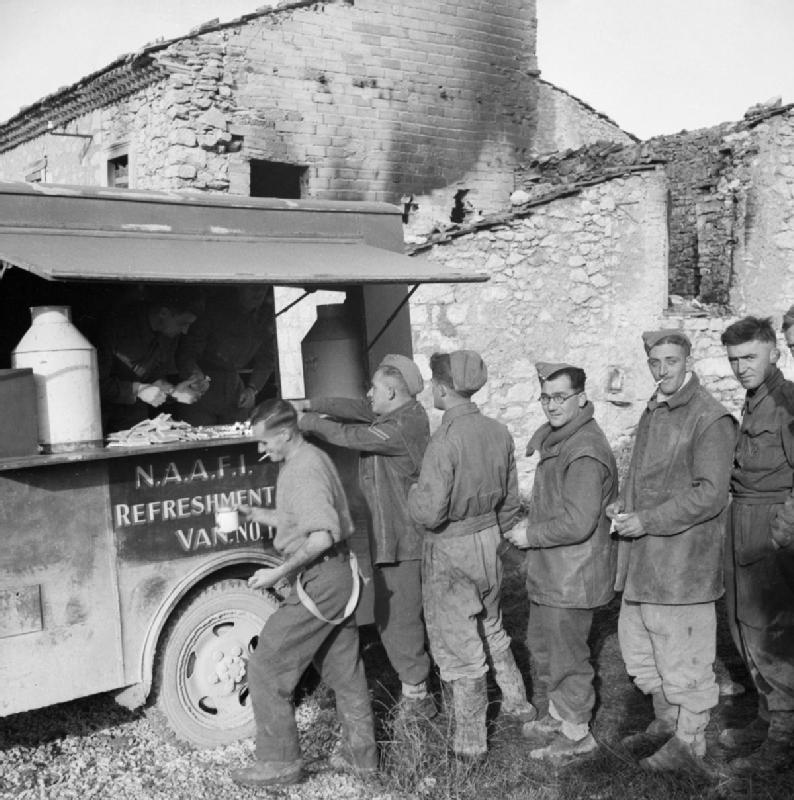
A NAAFI refreshment van during the Italian campaign of the Second World War

During the First World War the rapid expansion of the army saw new canteens created across the country. The government established a Board of Control to regulate these in January 1915. The canteen system was reformed in 1917 with the foundation of the Army Canteen Committee, this was a not for profit company, rather than a co-operative, but otherwise had the same aims as the Canteen and Mess Co-operative Society, which it absorbed. By April 1917 the committee managed more than 2,000 canteens across the world. The Navy joined the organisation in June 1917 and the newly formed Royal Air Force in April 1918. After the war a government committee recommended a single body be responsible for canteens in the armed forces and on 1 January 1921 the Navy, Army and Air Force Institutes (NAAFI) took over from the then Navy and Army Canteen Board. The NAAFI continues to operate as a government-owned company, running canteens in British garrisons and aboard Royal Navy ships.

=== United States ===
In the United States these stores are named Commissaries and Exchanges.

== See also ==
- Army & Navy Stores (Canada)
- Military surplus store
- Post exchange
- Sutler
