= Bang Pakong =

Bang Pakong (Thai: บางปะกง) may refer to:

- Bang Pakong River
- Bang Pakong District, Chachoengsao Province
- Bang Pakong, Bang Pakong District, Chachoengsao Province
- HTMS Bang Pakong, a Thai ship
