= HTMS Prachuap Khiri Khan =

Thai naval patrol vessel (commissioned 2017)

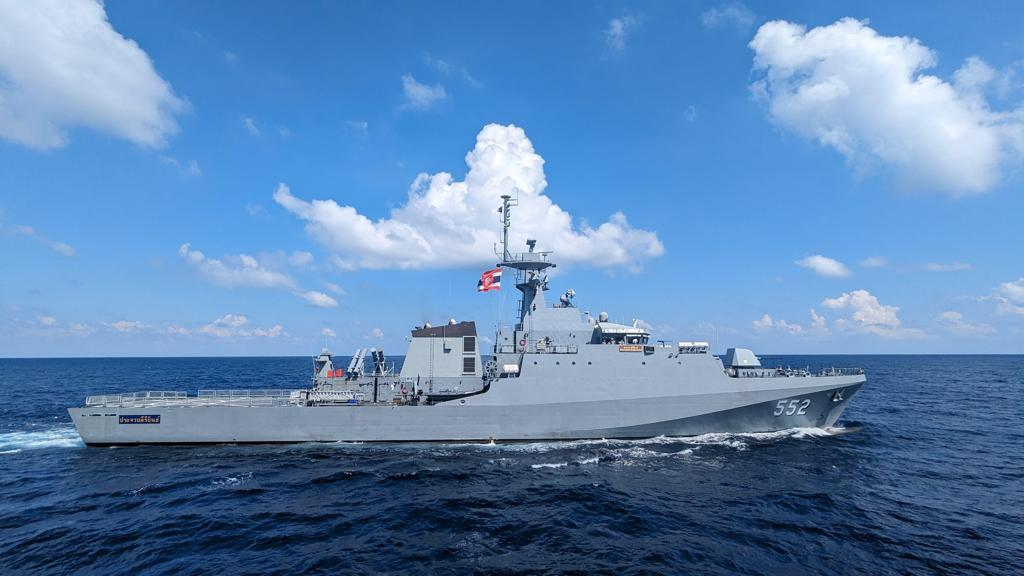
- HTMS Prachuap Khiri Khan

History

Thailand
- Name: HTMS Prachuap Khiri Khan
- Namesake: Prachuap Khiri Khan Province
- Builder: Mahidol Adulyadej Naval Dockyard; BAE Systems Surface Ships
- Launched: August 2019
- Commissioned: 27 September 2017
- Home port: Sattahip Naval Base
- Status: Active

General characteristics
- Class & type: Modified River-class patrol vessel
- Displacement: 2,000 t (2,000 long tons; 2,200 short tons)
- Length: 90.5 m (296 ft 11 in)
- Beam: 13.5 m (44 ft 3 in)
- Propulsion: 2 × MAN 16V28/33D diesel engines, 14,700kW/10,950HP, 2 shafts; 2 × controllable-pitch propellers
- Speed: 23 kn (43 km/h)
- Range: 3,500 nmi (6,500 km)
- Endurance: 14 days
- Sensors & processing systems: Thales Variant surveillance radar; Thales Lirod Mk2 fire control radar
- Armament: 4 x RGM-84 Harpoon anti-ship missiles; 1 × Oto Melara 76 mm gun; 2 × 30mm MSI guns; 2 × Machine guns
- Aircraft carried: One H145M helicopter
- Aviation facilities: 20-meter flight deck

HTMS Prachuap Khiri Khan (Thai: เรือหลวงประจวบคีรีขันธ์) is the second Krabi Class offshore patrol vessel (OPV) of the Royal Thai Navy.

She is a modified River-class offshore patrol vessel, and was built by Mahidol Adulyadej Naval Dockyard, with design and technology transfer support from BAE Systems Surface Ships. The ship was constructed at the Royal Thai Navy Mahidol Dockyard in Sattahip. The ship was launched in the presence of HRH Princess Maha Chakri Sirindhorn, second daughter of King Bhumibol Adulyadej on 2 August 2019.
