= HTMS Bangpakong =

The following ships of the Royal Thai Navy have been named Bangpakong:

- HTMS Bangpakong (corvette), a Flower-class corvette, previously HMS Burnet (K348) of the Royal Navy and HMIS Gondwana (K348) of the Royal Indian Navy, acquired in 1947
- HTMS Bangpakong (FFG-456), a Type 053 frigate built in the People's Republic of China
