= Mahidol Adulyadej Naval Dockyard =

Thai navy shipyard

Coordinates: 12.6307914°N 100.9266954°E

- อู่ราชนาวีมหิดลอดุลยเดช
- Sattahip, Chonburi in Thailand
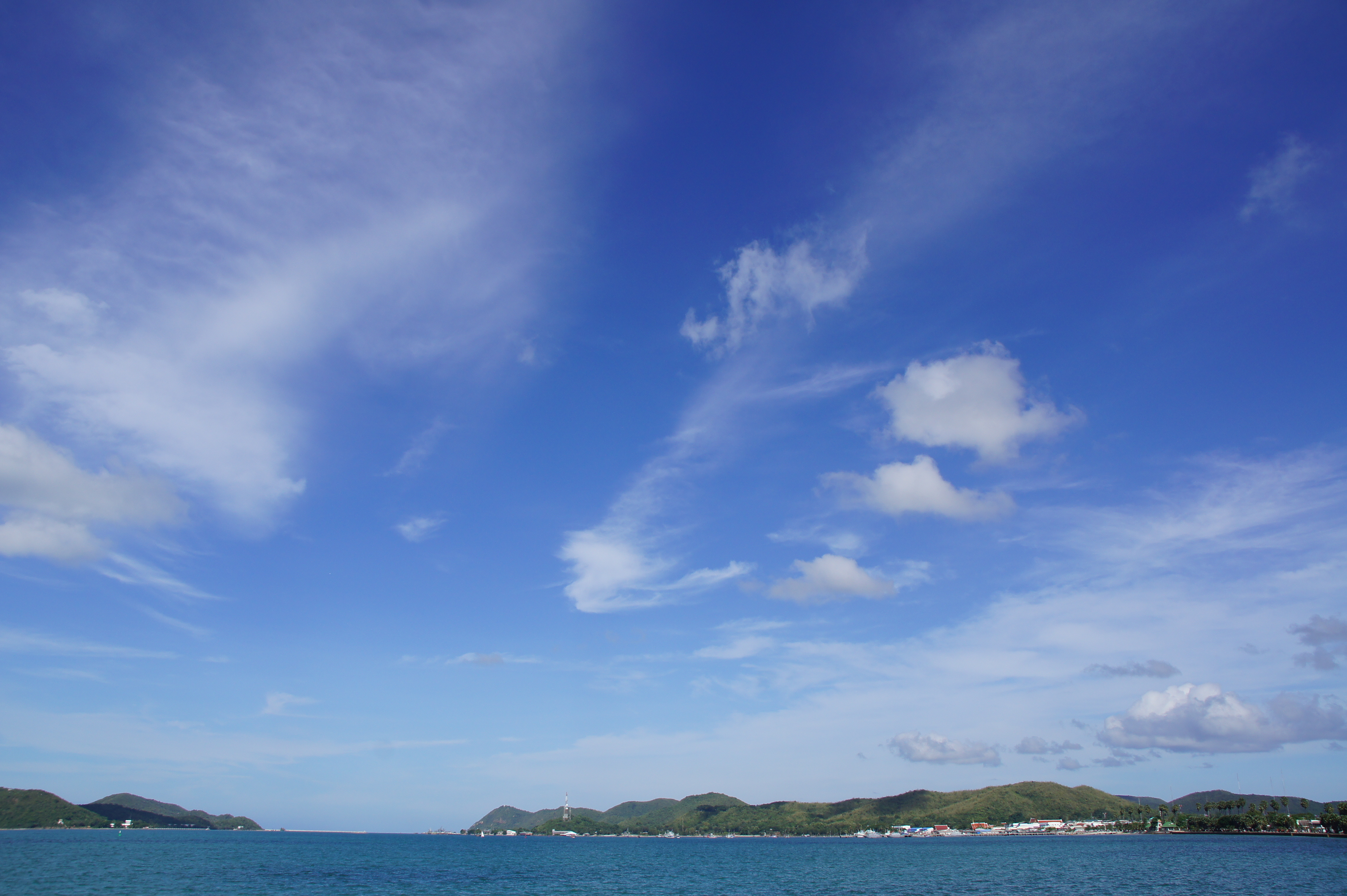
- The naval base in 2012

Site information
- Type: Shipyard
- Owner: Royal Thai Naval Dockyard Department
- Website: Official website

Site history
- Built: 21 April 1998

Mahidol Adulyadej Naval Dockyard (Thai: อู่ราชนาวีมหิดลอดุลยเดช กรมอู่ทหารเรือ) is a Royal Thai Navy shipyard in Sattahip, Chonburi. It is named after Prince Mahidol Adulyadej, who served in the Royal Siamese Navy from 1912 through 1914. There are plans to base one of Thailand's submarines at the dockyard.

== Operations ==
- HTMS Krabi (commissioned 2013) is an offshore patrol vessel built at the dockyard. It is a modified river-class patrol vessel.
- The Chinese-made HTMS Bangpakong was refitted at the yard and re-entered service in early-2017.
- HTMS Prachuap Khiri Khan (2017) is the second Krabi class offshore patrol vessel built at the dockyard.
