= John Bush (admiral of Siam) =

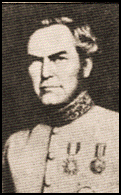
- Born: 4 August 1819; England
- Died: 3 April 1905 (aged 85); Bangkok, Siam
- Resting place: Bangkok Protestant Cemetery
- Other name: Captain Bush
- Occupation: Sea captain
- Title: Phraya Wisuth Sakoradith

Admiral Sir John Bush, KCWE, commonly known as Captain Bush and sometimes by his Thai title Phraya Wisuth Sakoradith (Thai: พระยาวิสูตรสาครดิฐ, 4 August 1819 – 3 April 1905), was an English sea captain who served under the Siamese government during the reigns of Kings Mongkut and Chulalongkorn. He came to Siam in early 1857 as a merchant ship captain and was engaged as Bangkok's Harbour Master the next year, captained royal vessels and managed the Bangkok Dock Company until his retirement in 1893. Soi Charoen Krung 30, the street where he used to live, is also known as Soi Captain Bush after him.
