= HTMS Krabi =

2011 Krabi-class patrol vessel

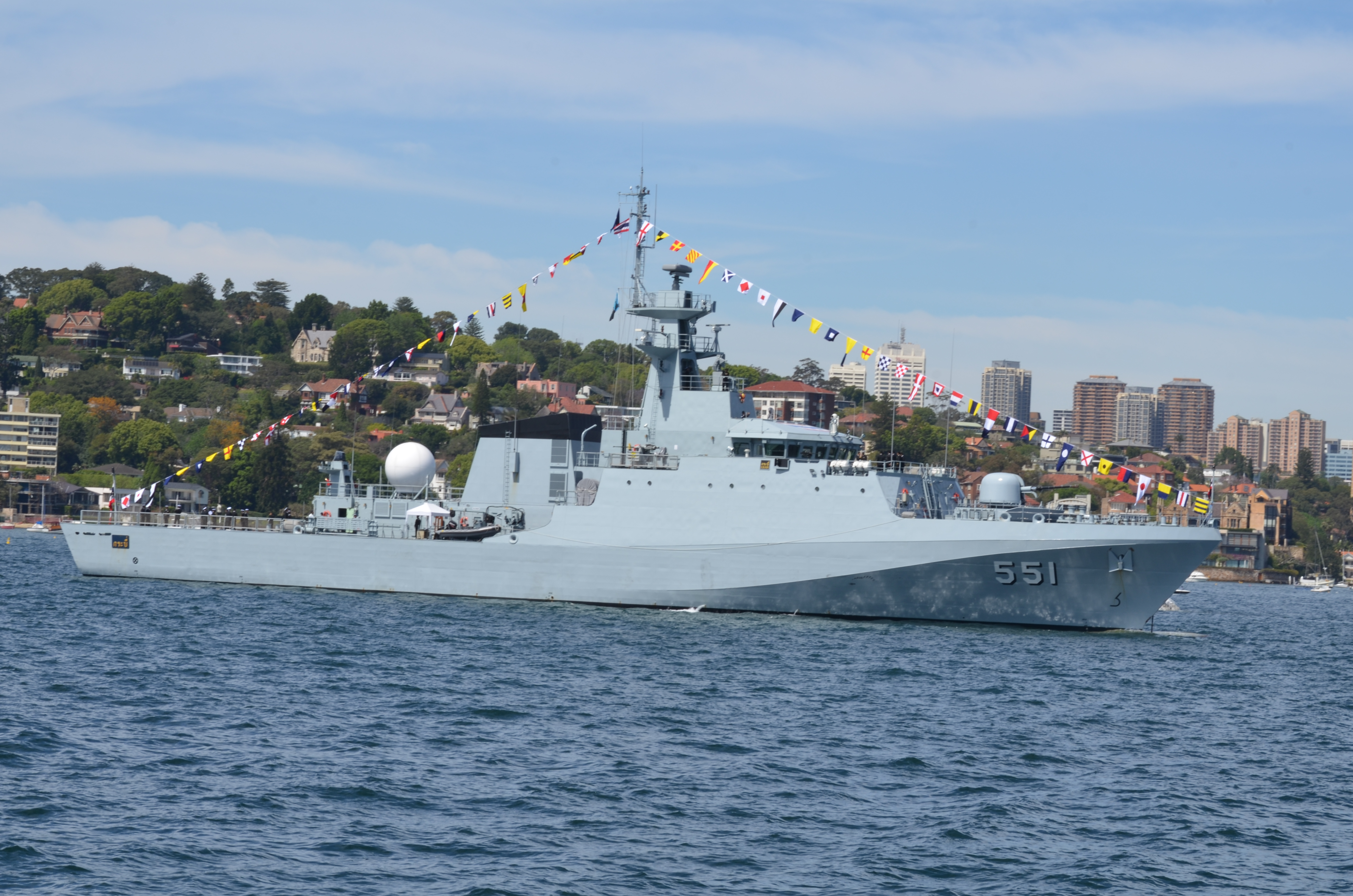
- HTMS Krabi moored in Sydney Harbour, October 2013

History

Thailand
- Name: HTMS Krabi
- Namesake: Krabi Province
- Builder: Mahidol Adulyadej Naval Dockyard; BAE Systems Surface Ships
- Launched: 3 December 2011
- Commissioned: 26 August 2013
- Identification: MMSI number: 567443000; Callsign: HSNK
- Status: Active

General characteristics
- Class & type: Modified River-class patrol vessel
- Displacement: 2,000 t (2,000 long tons; 2,200 short tons)
- Length: 90.5 m (296 ft 11 in)
- Beam: 13.5 m (44 ft 3 in)
- Propulsion: 2 × MAN 16V28/33D diesel engines, 14,700kW/10,950HP, 2 shafts; 2 × controllable-pitch propellers
- Speed: 25 kn (46 km/h)
- Range: 5,500 nmi (10,200 km)
- Endurance: 35 days
- Sensors & processing systems: Thales Variant surveillance radar; Thales Lirod Mk2 fire control radar
- Armament: 1 × Oto Melara 76 mm gun; 2 × 30mm MSI guns; 2 × Machine guns
- Aircraft carried: One H145M helicopter
- Aviation facilities: 20 meter flight deck

HTMS Krabi (OPV-551) is an offshore patrol vessel (OPV) of the Royal Thai Navy. She is a modified River-class patrol vessel, and was built by Mahidol Adulyadej Naval Dockyard, with design and technology transfer support from BAE Systems Surface Ships. Additional construction took place at the Royal Thai Navy Mahidol Dockyard in Sattahip.

== Construction ==
The contract for the construction of Krabi was signed in June 2009, and construction began in August 2010. Krabi was launched on 3 December 2011 in a ceremony attended by Princess Maha Chakri Sirindhorn. After launch, she began outfitting, and entered service in 2013. The Thai Navy plans to use Krabi to patrol Thailand's Economic Exclusion Zone (EEZ), as well as for fishery and natural resource protection and disaster relief.

Krabi is 91 meters in length, and carries an Oto Melara 76 mm main gun and two MSI 30mm secondary guns for primary defense, as well as machine guns. It is able to operate an AgustaWestland AW139 helicopter flying from a 20 metres (66 ft) flight deck. Her top speed is expected to be over 25 knots (46 km/h; 29 mph), and she is powered by two MAN 16v 28/33D diesel engines, making about 7.2 megawatts (9,700 hp). She is equipped with a Thales Variant surveillance radar, a Thales Lirod Mk2 fire control radar and the Thales Tacticos combat management system.

== Operational history ==
In October 2013 Krabi participated in the International Fleet Review 2013 in Sydney, Australia. In May 2016 the Royal Thai Navy said it is planning to deploy its new H145M helicopters from HTMS Krabi in service with 202 Squadron.

HTMS Krabi participated at the International Fleet Review 2026 held at Visakapatanam in India in February 2026.

== See also ==
- List of naval ship classes in service
- River-class patrol vessel (The HTMS Krabi is a modified version of this class)
