= Bangkok Dock Company =

Shipyard

Bangkok Dock Company Ltd

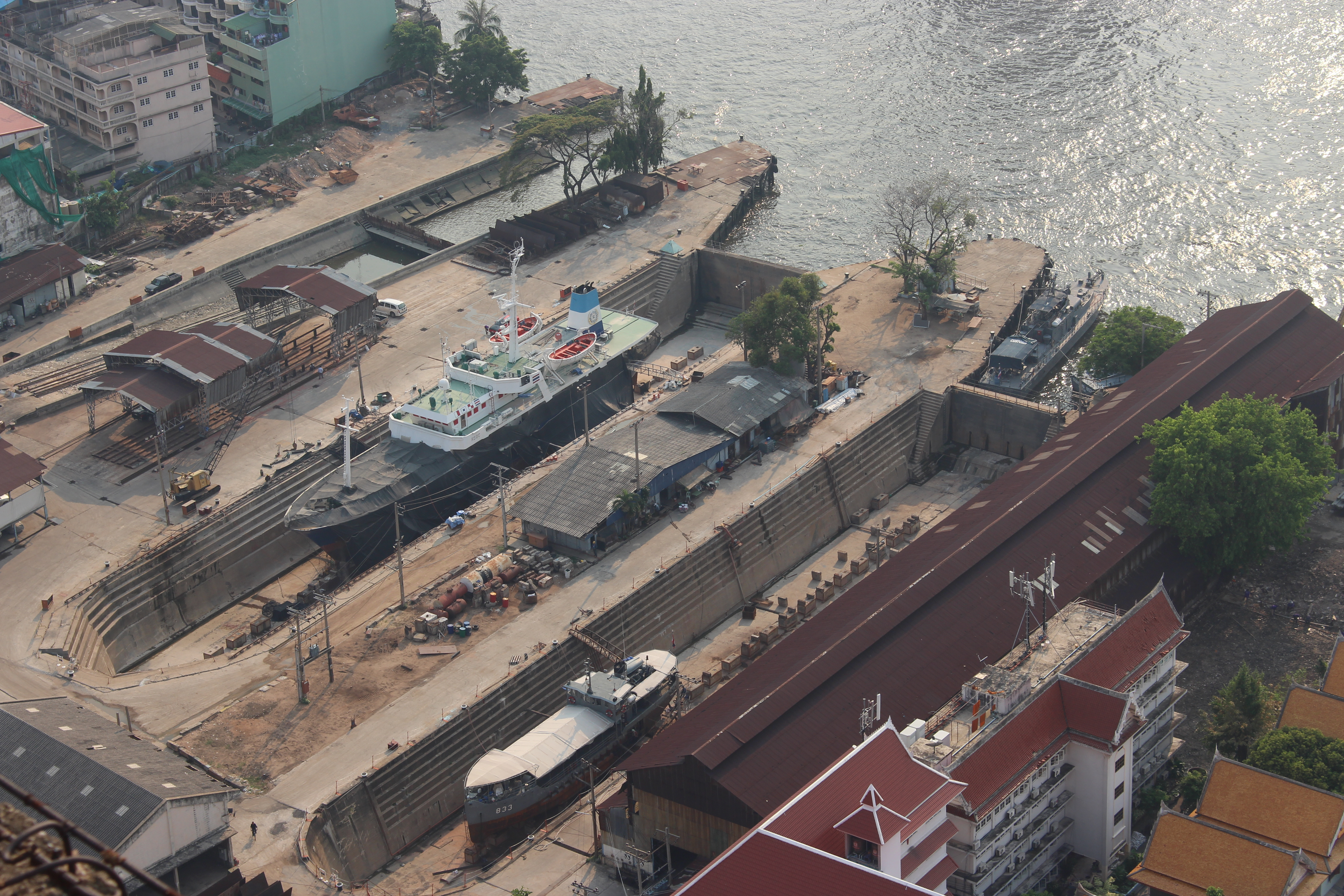
- The Bangkok Dock Company dockyard on Charoen Krung Road
- Native name: บริษัท อู่กรุงเทพ จำกัด
- Type: State owned enterprise
- Industry: Shipbuilding; defense
- Predecessor: Bangkok Dock Co.
- Founded: 1957; 69 years ago
- Founder: John Bush
- Headquarters: Sathon, Bangkok, Thailand
- Number of locations: 2 (2012)
- Area served: Thailand
- Products: Naval ship; patrol boat; landing craft; tanker; ferry
- Services: Ship building; Ship repair
- Net income: 13,266,419.67 baht (2010)
- Owner: Ministry of Finance (99.999%); Executive Committee (0.001%)
- Website: www.bangkokdock.co.th

The Bangkok Dock Company (1957) Limited (Thai: บริษัทอู่กรุงเทพ จำกัด) is a Thai shipbuilding company. It operates as a state enterprise under the oversight of the Ministry of Defence. It was founded in 1865 as the Bangkok Dock Co by Captain John Bush, the harbour master of Bangkok, and was acquired by the Royal Thai Navy in 1957. The company now has two facilities: the original Bangkok dockyard on Charoen Krung Road next to Wat Yan Nawa, and a newer main facility operating at the Mahidol Adulyadej Naval Dockyard at Sattahip in Chonburi Province.
