= HMIS Gondwana =

Modified Flower-class corvette in Indian Navy

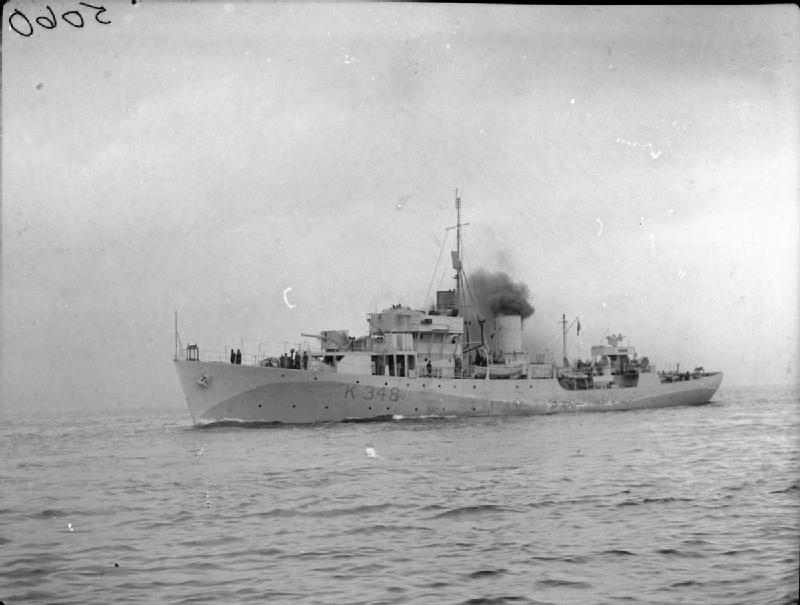
- Burnet underway

History

United Kingdom
- Name: Burnet
- Ordered: 22 July 1942
- Builder: Ferguson Shipbuilders, Port Glasgow
- Launched: 31 May 1943
- Commissioned: 15 May 1945
- Out of service: 1947
- Identification: Pennant number: K348
- Fate: Sold to Royal Thai Navy

British India
- Name: Gondwana
- Acquired: 15 May 1945, on loan from Royal Navy
- Commissioned: 15 May 1945
- Out of service: 17 May 1946
- Identification: Pennant number: K348
- Fate: Returned to Royal Navy

Thailand
- Name: Bangpakong
- Namesake: Bang Pakong River
- Acquired: 15 May 1947 from the Royal Navy
- Decommissioned: 1985

General characteristics
- Class & type: Flower-class corvette (modified)
- Displacement: 1,015 long tons (1,031 t; 1,137 short tons)
- Length: 208 ft (63.40 m)o/a
- Beam: 33 ft (10.06 m)
- Draught: 11 ft (3.35 m)
- Propulsion: Single shaft, 2× oil fired water tube boilers, 1 triple-expansion reciprocating steam engine, 2,750 ihp (2,050 kW)
- Speed: 16 knots (29.6 km/h)
- Range: 3,500 nautical miles (6,482 km) at 12 knots (22.2 km/h)
- Complement: 90
- Sensors & processing systems: One Type 271 SW2C radar, one Type 144 sonar
- Armament: 1 × 4 in (102 mm) BL Mk.IX single gun; 1 × 2-pounder Mk.VIII single "pom-pom"; 2 × 20 mm Oerlikon single; 1 × Hedgehog A/S mortar; 4 × Mk.II depth charge throwers; 2 Depth charge rails with 70 depth charges

HMIS Gondwana (K348) was a World War II Flower-class corvette of the Royal Indian Navy (RIN). She was originally ordered for and commissioned as HMS Burnet of the Royal Navy, but transferred to RIN immediately upon commissioning.

She was transferred back to the Royal Navy in 1946 and subsequently sold to the Royal Thai Navy in 1947, and commissioned as HTMS Bangpakong (Thai: เรือหลวงบางปะกง).

== History ==
Burnet was ordered from Ferguson Shipbuilders, Limited in Glasgow for the Royal Navy in 1942. She was transferred to the Royal Indian Navy immediately and commissioned as HMIS Gondwana on 15 May 1945, just months before the end of World War II. After the war, she was briefly used as an apprentice seaman training ship before being transferred back to the Royal Navy just on 17 May 1946.

She was sold to the Royal Thai Navy in 1947 as HTMS Bangpakong, and served in the Korean War in 1950–1951 before returning to Thailand. Bangpakong has since been decommissioned.
