= Royal Thai Navy =

Naval warfare branch of Thailand's military

- กองทัพเรือ
- Emblem of the Royal Thai Navy
- Founded: 20 November 1906 (119 years)
- Country: Thailand
- Branch: Royal Thai Marine Corps; Air and Coastal Defense Command
- Type: Navy
- Role: Naval warfare
- Size: 69,850 active personnel 241 ships 302 Aircraft
- Part of: Royal Thai Armed Forces And Royal Thai Armed Forces Headquarters
- Garrison/HQ: Bangkok Yai,Bangkok; Bangkok Noi, Bangkok (Headquarters)
- Nicknames: "ทร." "Thor raw" Abbreviation of Navy "ราชนาวี" "Raj Navy" Royal Navy
- Motto: ร่วมเครือนาวี จักยลปฐพีไพศาล ('Join the Navy to see the world')
- Colours: Navy blue
- March: เพลงราชนาวี ('Navy March'); เพลงดอกประดู่ ('Dok Pradu Song')
- Engagements: Franco-Siamese crisis; Paknam incident; World War I; Western Front; Asian and Pacific theatre of World War I; French-Thai War; Battle of Koh Chang; World War II; Greater East Asia War; Palace Rebellion; Manhattan Rebellion; Cold War; Korean War; Vietnam War; Communist insurgency in Thailand; Communist insurgency in Malaysia; Vietnamese border raids in Thailand; Persian Gulf War; 1999 East Timorese crisis; International Force East Timor; War on terror; Operation Enduring Freedom – Horn of Africa; Anti-Piracy operation in Gulf of Aden; Anti-Piracy in strait of Malacca; Southern Insurgency; 2003 Phnom Penh riots; 2015 Rohingya refugee crisis; Operation Sahayogi Haat; Tham Luang cave rescue; Cambodian–Thai border dispute; 2025 Cambodia–Thailand clashes
- Battle honours: Battle of Ko Chang
- Website: navy.mi.th

Commanders
- Commander-in-chief: Admiral Pairote Fuengchan

Insignia
- Flag

- Naval jack and unit colour

- Naval ensign

- Fin flash

The Royal Thai Navy (Abrv: RTN, ทร.; Thai: กองทัพเรือไทย, RTGS: kong thap ruea thai) is the naval warfare force of Thailand. Established in 1906, it was modernised by the Admiral Prince Abhakara Kiartiwongse (1880–1923) who is known as the father of the Royal Navy. It has a structure that includes the naval fleet, Royal Thai Marine Corps, and Air and Coastal Defence Command. The RTN headquarters is at Sattahip Naval Base.

The navy operates three naval area commands (NAC): Northern Gulf of Thailand (First NAC); Southern Gulf of Thailand (Second NAC); and the Andaman Sea (Indian Ocean) (Third NAC). RTN also has two air wings and one flying unit on its aircraft carrier.

== History ==
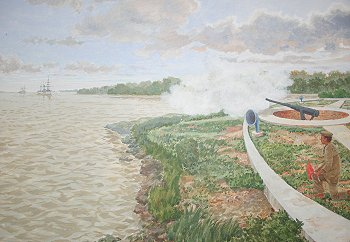
Chulachomklao Fort firing on French ships

=== Ancient era ===
The military naval history of Thailand encompasses over 1300 years of armed struggle, from wars with her regional rivals, the Khmer Empire, Burma, and periods of conflicts with the British Empire and French Indochina during the colonial era.

The naval arm of the army consisted mainly of riverine war craft whose mission was to control the Chao Phraya River and protect ships carrying the army to battle. The warships carried up to 30 musketeers, a large number of rowers and a front 6 or 12-pounder cannons or no guns at all.

The Siamese navy was also supported by Chinese immigrants, mostly in Chantaburi. During the era of Taksin the Great, his army successfully sieged the old capital of Ayutthaya with the help of the Chinese shipwrights who are masters of building war junks, which carried more guns than riverine warcrafts.

=== Vietnamese-Siamese war ===
The timeline of emergence of a Siamese sea fleet is unknown. Most of its sailors were foreign, such as Cham, Malay, and Chinese. It is assumed that in this era, Ships designs changed from shallow draft Chinese junk (Reu-Sam-Pau/Reụ̄x s̄ảp̣heā) to deeper draft Kam-pan and sloop; with a short period of copied Vietnamese junks. The most prominent naval battle was at Vàm Nao River.

=== Franco-Siamese crisis ===
The Paknam Incident was a navy engagement fought during the Franco-Siamese crisis in July 1893. Three French ships violated Siamese territory and warning shots were fired at them by a Siamese fort and a force of gunboats on the Chao Phraya River in Paknam. In the ensuing battle, France prevailed and blockaded Bangkok. Peace was restored on 3 October 1893 after the British put pressure on both the Siamese and French to reach a negotiated settlement.

=== World War I ===
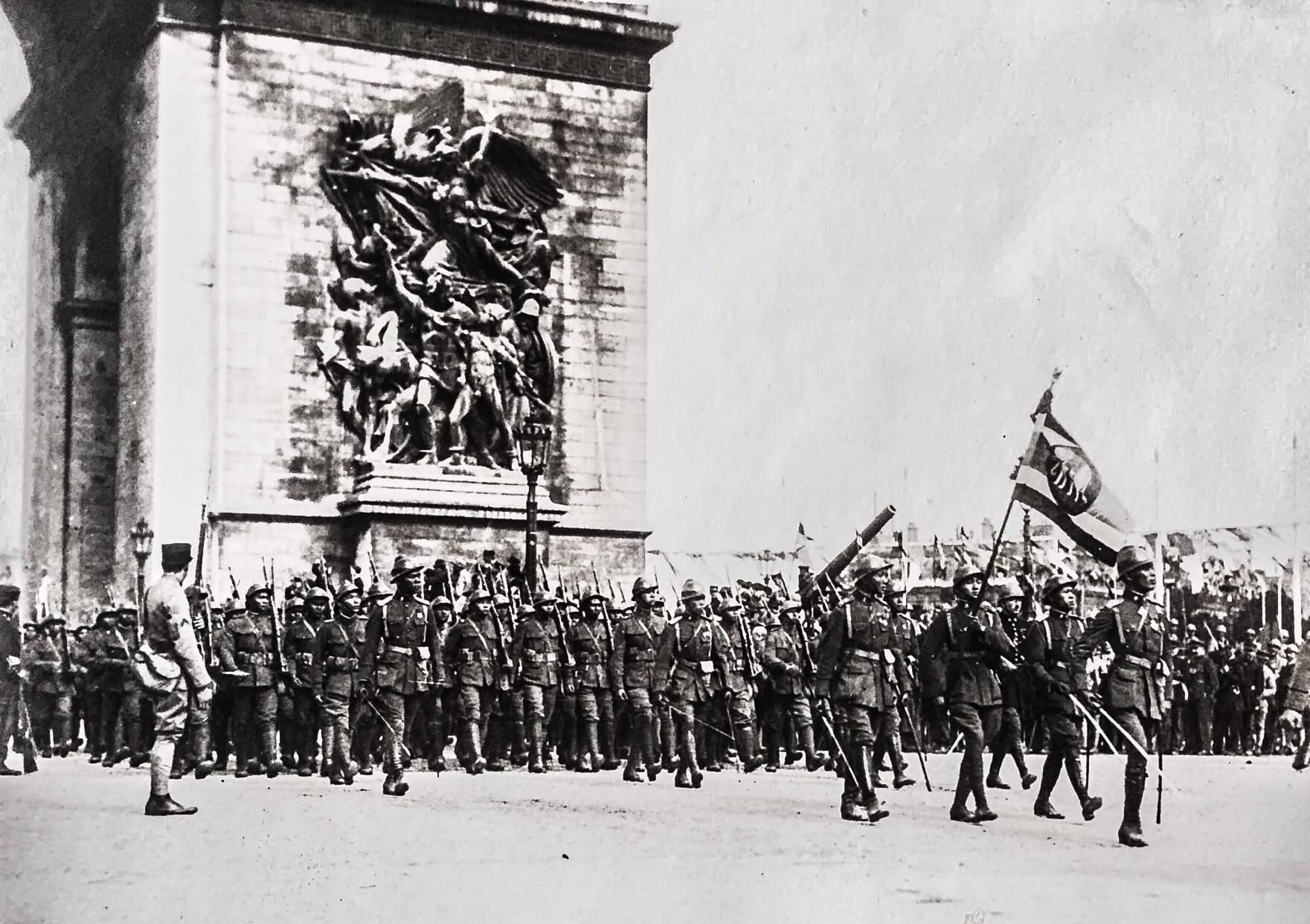
The Siamese Expeditionary Force, Paris, 1919

The First World War had no direct impact on Siam due to its distance from the fighting. The war did, however, provide an opportunity for King Rama VI to strengthen his country's position in the international arena. He also used the war as a means to promote the concept of a Siamese nation.

Siamese sailors were part of a volunteer expeditionary force, consisting of medical, motor transport, and aviation detachments. By early-1918, 1,284 men were selected from thousands of volunteers. The force was commanded by Major General Phraya Bhijai Janriddhi and was sent to France.

=== After World War I ===
==== Franco-Thai War ====
The Battle of Ko Chang took place on 17 January 1941 during the Franco-Thai War in which a flotilla of French warships attacked a smaller force of Thai vessels, including a coastal defence ship. The HTMS Thonburi was heavily damaged and grounded on a sand bar at the mouth of the Chanthaburi River, with about 20 dead. The Thai transport HTMS Chang arrived at Ko Chang shortly after the French departed and took the Thonburi in tow, before purposefully running her aground in Laem Ngop.

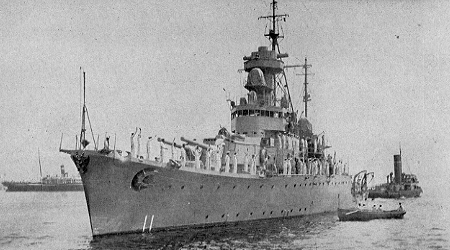
HTMS Thonburi, 1938

The French suffered 11 men killed. During the post-action investigations, the Thai Navy claimed, based on statements by Thai sailors and the fisherman around Ko Chang and merchantmen in Saigon, that heavy damage was seen to have been caused to the French ship Lamotte-Picquet and her squadron. The battle was a tactical victory by the French Navy over the Thai Navy although the strategic result is disputed. The Japanese intervened diplomatically and mediated a ceasefire. Within a month of the engagement, the French and the Thais had negotiated a peace that ended the war.

==== World War II ====
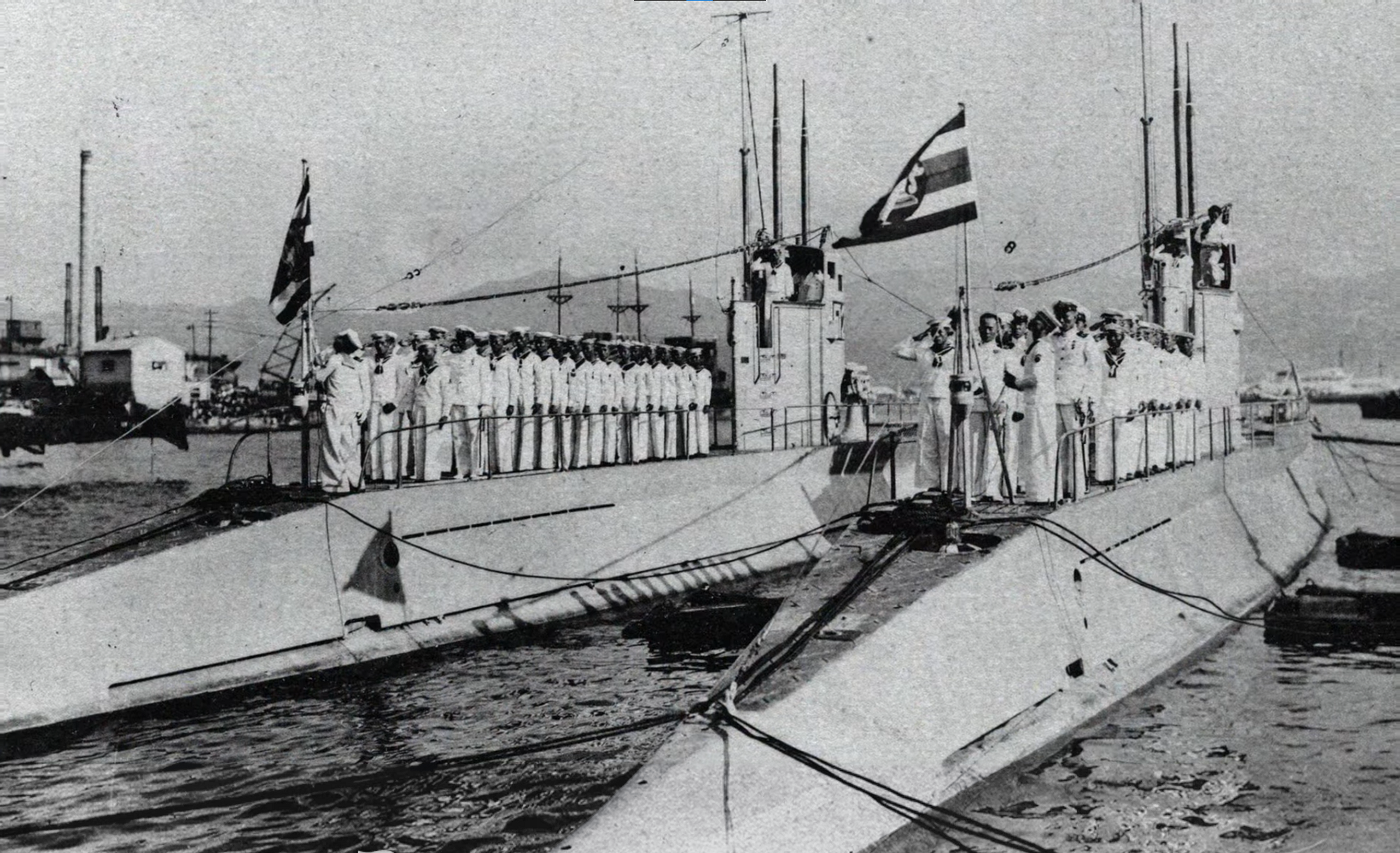
HTMS Matchanu and HTMS Wirun, Kobe Port, 1938

During World War II, Siam allied with Japan after Japan invaded Siam on 8 December 1941. Thailand officially joined the war in January 1942.

Thai submarines saw service throughout World War II, but saw no combat. Two of them did serve an unconventional role during the war. On 14 April 1945, five months before the Japanese surrender, Bangkok's Samsen and Wat Liab Power Plants were bombed by the Allies, leaving the city without electricity. In response to a request from the Bangkok Electricity Authority, the Matchanu and Wirun anchored at the Bangkok Dock Company and served as power generators for one of Bangkok's tram lines.

==== Manhattan Rebellion ====
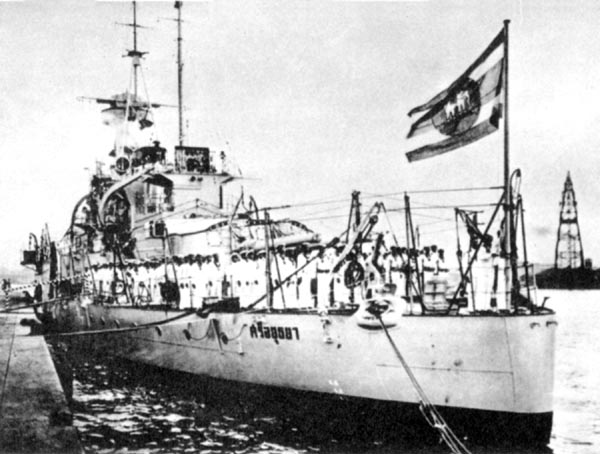
HTMS Sri Ayudhya

During the Manhattan Rebellion of 1951, the navy was involved in a failed coup against Prime Minister Plaek Phibunsongkhram which led to the sinking of flagship HTMS Sri Ayudhya.

==== Vietnam War ====
In support of South Vietnam and its allies during the Vietnam War, two Thai naval vessels supported ground forces with naval bombardments.

=== Later years ===
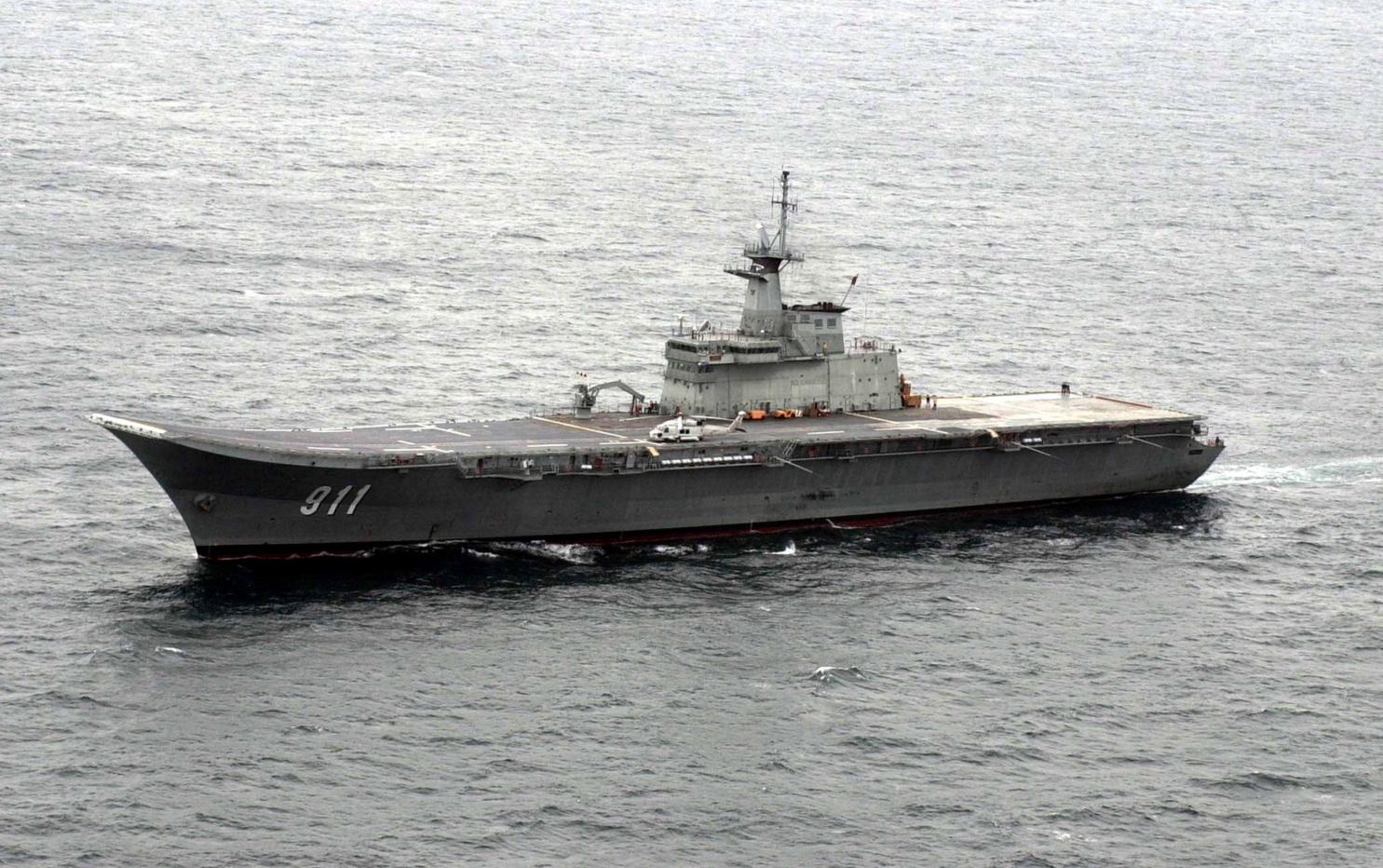
HTMS Chakri Naruebet

The navy's combat forces include the Royal Fleet and the Royal Thai Marine Corps. The 130 vessels of the Royal Fleet include frigates equipped with surface-to-air missiles, fast attack craft armed with surface-to-surface missiles, large coastal patrol craft, coastal minelayers, coastal minesweepers, landing craft, and training ships.

The mission space of the Thailand navy includes rivers and the Gulf of Thailand and the Indian Ocean, which are separated by the Kra Isthmus. Naval affairs are directed by the country's most senior admiral from his Bangkok headquarters. The naval commander in chief is supported by staff groups that plan and administer such activities as logistics, education and training, and various special services. The headquarters general staff function like the corresponding staffs in the Royal Thai Army army and Royal Thai Air Force command structures.

== Command and control ==
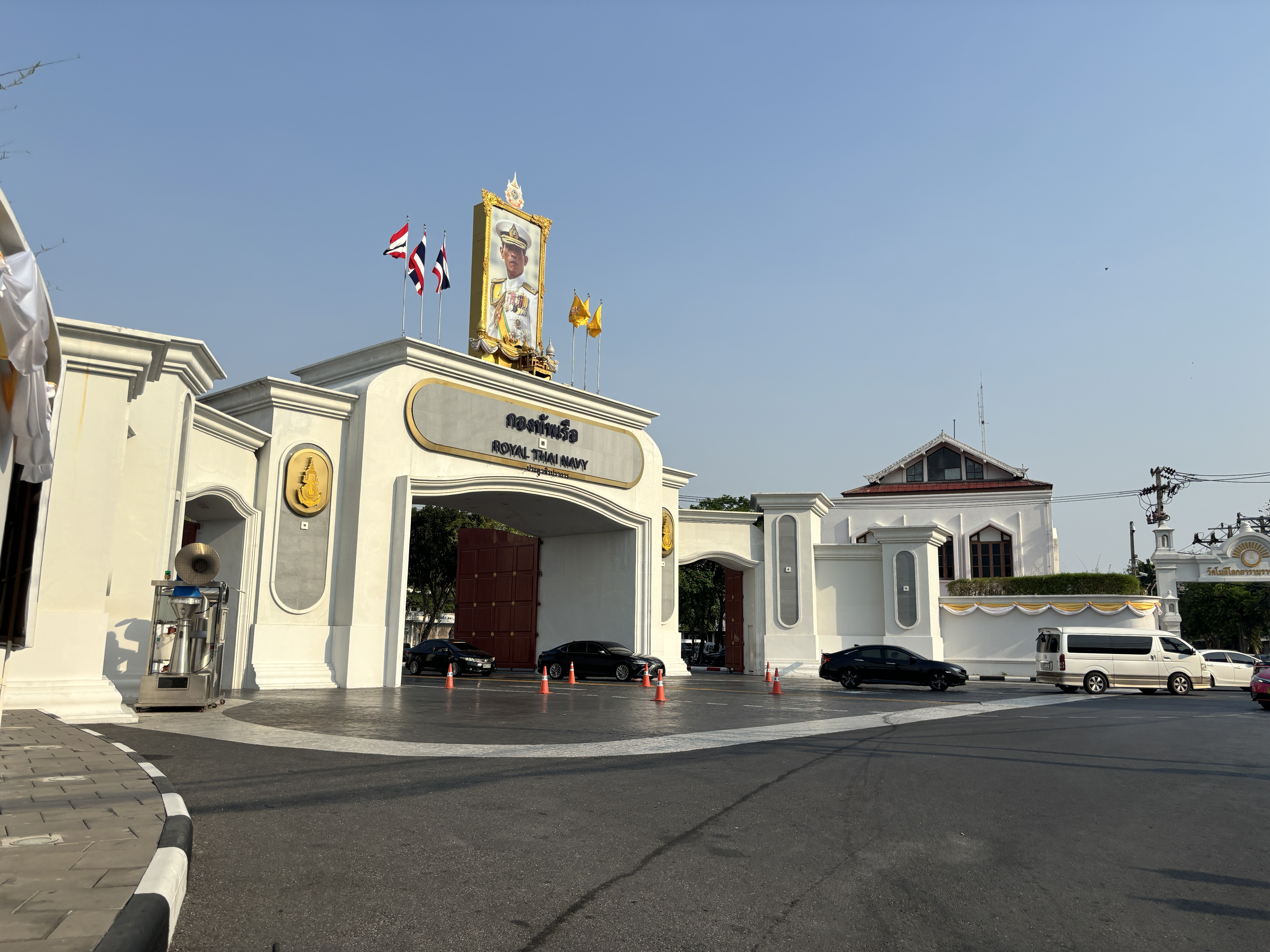
Royal Thai Navy HQ on Arun Amarin Road, Bangkok

The Royal Thai Navy is commanded by the Commander-in-Chief of the Royal Thai Navy, currently, Admiral Jirapol Wongwit, who was appointed in 2024. The Royal Thai Navy headquarters is in Bangkok.

- Commander-in-Chief, Royal Thai Navy: Admiral Jirapol Wongwit
- Deputy Commander-in-Chief, Royal Thai Navy: Admiral Chonlathit Navanukroh
- President, Royal Thai Navy Advisory Group: Admiral Worawut Pruksarungruang
- Assistant Commander-in-Chief, Royal Thai Navy: Admiral Pichit Srirungruang
- Chief of Staff, Royal Thai Navy: Admiral Pairote Fuengchan
- Commander-in-Chief, Royal Thai Fleet: Admiral Nattaphon Diewwanich

== Naval Area Commands ==
=== Naval Area Commands ===
Thai Navy Bases District Forces

The Royal Thai Navy operates three naval area commands:

- First Naval Area Command: responsible for the northern part of Gulf of Thailand
- Second Naval Area Command: responsible for the southern part of Gulf of Thailand
- Third Naval Area Command: responsible for the Andaman Sea (Indian Ocean)

=== District forces ===
- Navy Fleet District Forces
  - Northern Gulf of Thailand Fleet
  - Southern Gulf of Thailand Fleet
  - Andaman Sea Fleet
- Royal Thai Naval Air District Forces
  - U-Tapao Royal Thai Navy Airfield
  - Chanthaburi Airstrip
  - Nakhon Phanom Royal Thai Navy Base
  - Songkhla Royal Thai Navy Airfield
  - Phuket Royal Thai Navy Airfield
  - Narathiwat Airstrip
- Navy Bases District Forces
  - Sattahip Naval Base
  - Bangkok Naval Base
  - Phang-nga Naval Base
  - Songkhla Naval Base
  - Phuket Naval Base
  - Samui Naval Base
  - Trat Naval Base

== Organization ==
Naval Headquarters

Naval Headquarters

- Naval Secretariat Department
- Naval Administration Department
- Naval Personnel Department
- Naval Intelligence Department
- Naval Operations Department
- Naval Logistics Department
- Naval Communications and Information Technology department
- Naval Civil Affairs Department
- Office of the Naval Comptroller
- Naval Finance Department
- Naval Inspector General
- Naval Internal Audit Office
- Naval Acquisition Management Office
- Judge Advocate General of the Royal Thai Navy
- Office of Security Coordination with the Internal Security Operations Command, Royal Thai Navy
Naval Fleet
- Royal Thai Fleet
  - Patrol Squadron
  - 1st Frigate Squadron (FS1)
  - 2nd Frigate Squadron (FS2)
  - Helicopter Carrier Squadron (HCS)
  - Submarine Squadron (SS)
  - Mine Squadron (MS)
  - Amphibious and Combat Support Service Squadron (ACSSS)
  - Coast Guard Squadron (CGS)
  - Riverine Squadron (RS)
  - Royal Thai Naval Air Division (RTNAD)
  - Naval Special Warfare Command (NSWC)
  - Fleet Training Command (FTC)
  - Fleet Support Division (SD)
- First Naval Area Command
  - Bangkok Naval Base
  - Sattahip Naval Base
- Ship Repair Facilities, Sattahip Naval Base
- Sattahip Commercial Port, Royal Thai Navy
- Naval Music Division
- Second Naval Area Command
  - Songkhla Naval Base
- Third Naval Area Command
  - Phang Nga Naval Base
- Royal Thai Marine Corps (RTMC)
- Air and Coastal Defence Command (ACDC)
- Naval Military Police Regiment (NMPR)
- Phra Chulachomklao Fort
- Royal Thai Navy Counter-Piracy Task Group
Naval Logistics Support Group
- Royal Thai Naval Dockyard (RTND)
- Naval Electronics Department (NED)
- Naval Public Works Department (NPWD)
- Naval Ordnance Department (NORDD)
- Naval Supply Department (NSD)
- Naval Medical Department (NMD)
- Naval Transportation Department (NTD)
- Naval Hydrographic Department (HD)
- Naval Welfare Department (NWD)
- Naval Science Department (NScD)
Naval Education, Research and Development Group
- Naval Education Department (NED)
  - Naval Command and Staff College (NCSC)
  - Naval Line Officers School (LOS)
  - Naval Rating School (NRS)
  - Naval Non Commissioned Officers School (NCOS)
  - Naval Recruit Training Center (RTC)
  - Royal Thai Navy Language Center (RTNLC)
  - Naval Strategic Studies Center (NSSC)
- Royal Thai Naval Academy (RTNA)
- Naval Research and Development Office (NRDO)
Naval Task Forces
- Mekong Riverine Unit
- Chanthaburi and Trat Border Defense Command, Royal Thai Marine Corps
- Thai Maritime Enforcement Command Center
- 1st Naval Area Command Maritime Enforcement Command Center
- 2nd Naval Area Command Maritime Enforcement Command Center
- 3rd Naval Area Command Maritime Enforcement Command Center
- Border Patrol Flotilla
- Naval Operations Center
- Thai Volunteers for National Defense at Sea Center
- Royal Thai Navy Command Center
- Klai Kangwon Palace Watch Keeping Group
- Southern Thailand Operations Force
- Southern Thailand Air Task Unit
- Andaman Sea Operations Force
- Andaman Sea Operations Group
- Thai-Myanmar Border Fishery Coordination Center
- Thai Maritime Enforcement Coordinating Center
- Thai Maritime Enforcement Directorate Center
Other units
- U-Tapao International Airport
- Navy Disaster Relief Center
- Plutaluang Royal Thai Navy Golf Course
- Salaya Navy Golf Course
- Navy Welfare Coordination Center
- Naval Supply Center, Naval Supply Department

=== Royal Thai Naval Dockyard ===
The Naval Dockyard was on Arun amarin Road, Siriraj Subdistrict, Bangkoknoi District, Bangkok. It has constructed and repaired ships since the reign of King Mongkut. As ships grew larger, King Chulalongkorn ordered the construction of a large wooden dock. He presided over the opening ceremony on 9 January 1890, a date now considered the birth of the Naval Department. Its headquarters is now at Mahidol Adulyadej Naval Dockyard, Sattahip District, Chonburi Province.

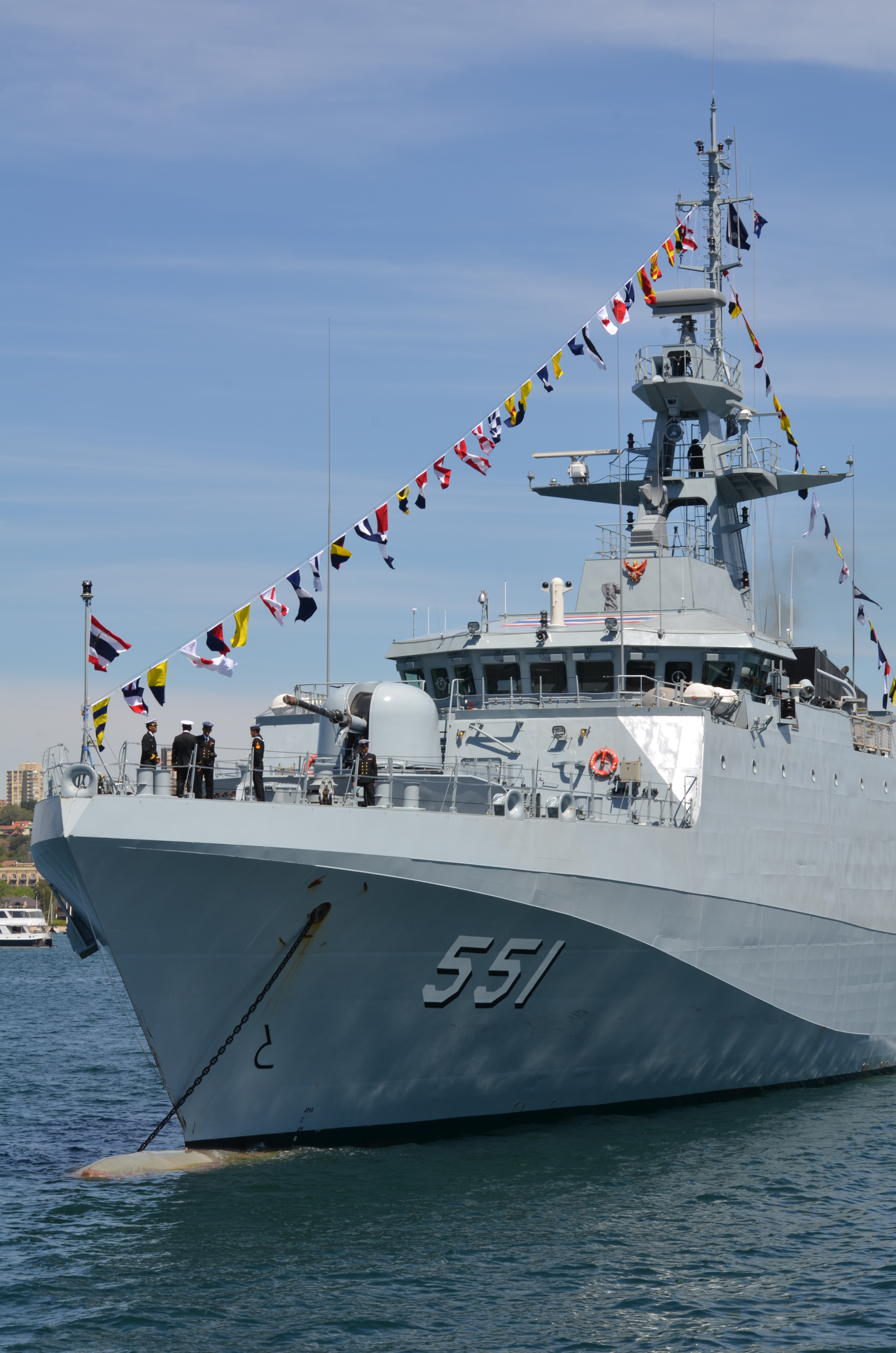
Thai offshore patrol vessel HTMS Krabi

- Ships built during the reign of King Rama VIII, Ananda Mahidol:
  - HTMS Sarasin-class: Fisheries boat; displacement 50 tons; three ships in this class
  - Coast Guard Boat 9 class: Coast Guard boat; displacement 11.25 tons; four ships in this class
  - HTMS Prong: Tanker; displacement 150 tons
- Ships built during the reign of King Rama IX, King Bhumibol Adulyadej the Great:
  - HTMS Khamronsin (II)-class: Corvette; displacement 450 tons; three ships in this class
  - HTMS Hua Hin-class: Patrol gunboat; displacement 530 tons; three ships in this class
  - HTMS Sattahip (I)-class: Torpedo boat; displacement 110 tons
  - Tor.91-class: Patrol Boat: displacement 115 tons; nine ships in this class
  - Thor (II)-class: Minesweeper; displacement 29.56 tons; five ships in this class
  - HTMS Proet: Tanker; displacement 412 tons; two ships in this class
  - HTMS Chuang-class: Water tanker; displacement 360 tons; two ships in this class
  - HTMS Samaesarn (II)-class: Tugboat; displacement 328 tons; two ships in this class
  - Tor.991-class: Gunboat; displacement 115 tons; four ships in this class
  - HTMS Krabi-class: Offshore patrol vessel; displacement 1,969 tons; two ships in this class
  - HTMS Laemsing-class: Patrol gunboat; displacement 520 tons

=== Royal Thai Marine Corps ===
The Royal Thai Marine Corps (RTMC) was founded in 1932, when the first battalion was formed with the assistance of the United States Marine Corps. It was expanded to a regiment in 1940 and was in action against communist guerrillas throughout the 1950s and 1960s. During the 1960s, the United States Marine Corps assisted in its expansion into a brigade. In December 1978, RECON teams of The Royal Thai Marine Corps were sent to the Mekong River during skirmishes with the Pathet Lao, a communist political movement and organisation in Laos.

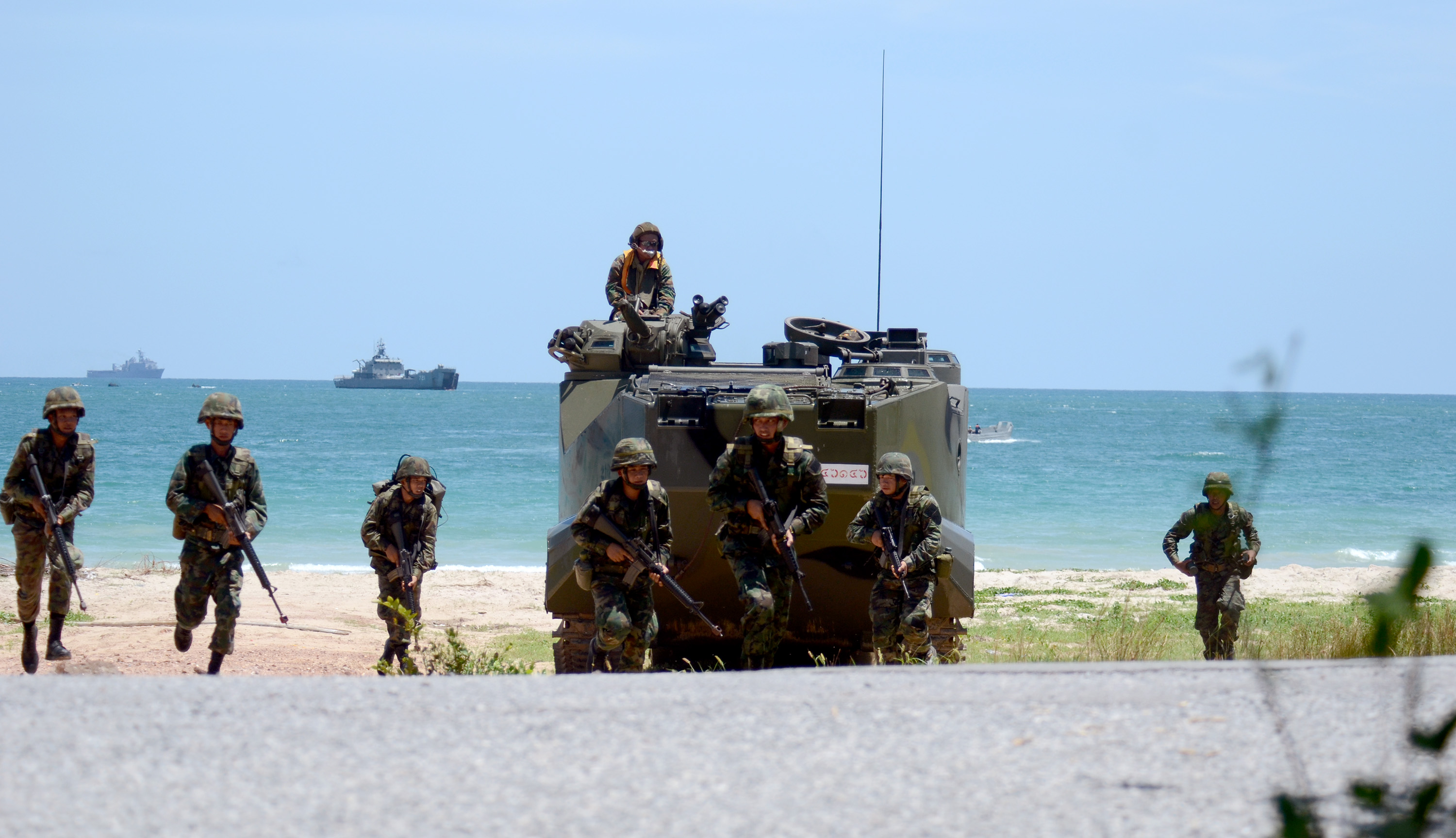
Royal Thai Marine Corps conduct amphibious assault training

Thai Marines today are responsible for border security in Chanthaburi and Trat provinces. They have fought communist insurgents in engagements at Baan Hard Lek, Baan Koat Sai, Baan Nhong Kok, Baan Kradook Chang, Baan Chumrark, and in the battle of Hard Don Nai in Nakhon Phanom Province. They serve in 2019 in the southern border provinces currently affected by the South Thailand insurgency. A monument to their valor stands at the Royal Thai Navy base at Sattahip.

==== Marine special force ====
The RTMC Reconnaissance Battalion, known as "RECON", is a reconnaissance battalion. It falls under the command of the Royal Thai Marine Division. The mission of Reconnaissance Battalion is to provide task forces to conduct amphibious reconnaissance, ground reconnaissance, battlespace shaping operations, raids, and specialized insertion and extraction.

=== Naval Special Warfare Command ===
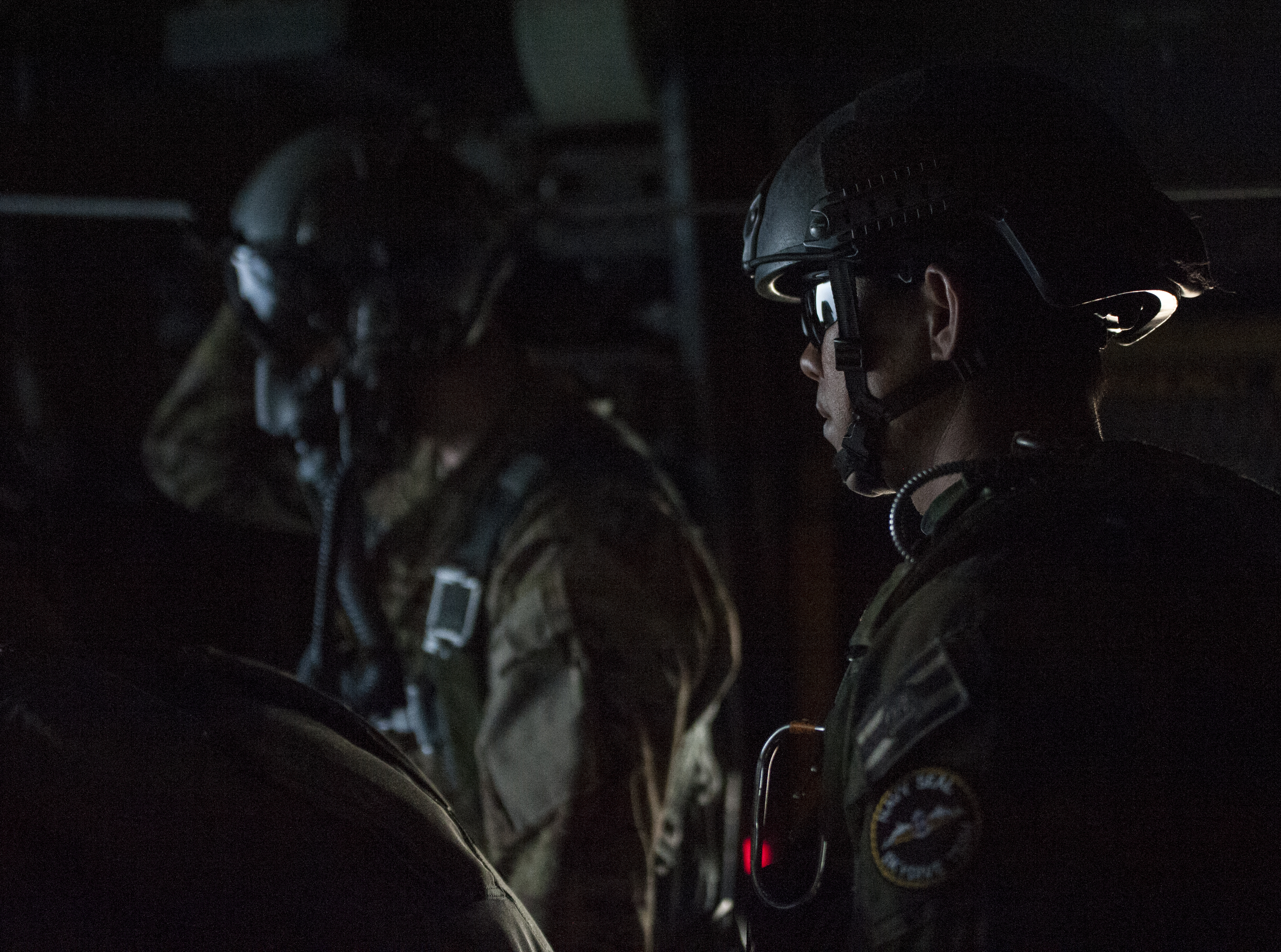
Royal Thai Navy SEALs

The Naval Special Warfare Command was set up as an underwater demolition assault unit in 1956 with the assistance of the US. A small element of the Navy SEALs has been trained to conduct maritime counter-terrorism missions. The unit has close ties with the United States Navy SEALs and conducts regular joint training exercises.

Most of the operations of the Navy SEALs are highly sensitive and are rarely divulged to the public. Navy SEALs have been used to gather intelligence along the Thai border during times of heightened tension. Navy SEALs have participated in anti-piracy operations in the Gulf of Thailand.

Thai Navy SEALs participated in the Tham Luang cave rescue. The rescue team successfully extricated members of 12 junior football players and their coach, who were trapped in Tham Luang Nang Non Cave in Chiang Rai Province in July 2018. One former Navy SEAL died in the rescue effort.

=== Air and Coastal Defence Command ===
The Air and Coastal Defence Command was formed in 1992 under the control of the Royal Fleet Headquarters, with one coastal defence regiment and one air defence regiment. Personnel were initially drawn from the Royal Thai Marine Corps, but are now being recruited directly. The First Coastal Defence Regiment is based near the Marine Corps facility at Sattahip. The First Air Defence Regiment was near the Naval Air Wing at U-Tapao. Coastal Defence Command was greatly expanded in 1992, following the government's decision in 1988 to charge the RTN with the responsibility of defending the eastern seaboard and Southern Seaboard Development Project. The Second Air Defence Regiment, based at Songkhla, was formed the following year. Some analysts believe that this element will eventually grow to a strength of up to 15,000 personnel.

- The First Air Defence Regiment: its mission is to provide anti-aircraft defence for the northern Gulf of Thailand with three anti-aircraft battalions.
- The Second Air Defence Regiment: to provide anti-aircraft defence for the southern Gulf of Thailand and Andaman Sea with three anti-aircraft battalions.
- The First Coastal Defence Regiment: has three artillery battalions.
- Two Air and Coastal Defence Command and Control Centers
- Air and Coastal Defence Supporting Regiment: one transportation battalion, one communications battalion, one maintenance battalion.

=== Royal Thai Naval Air Division ===
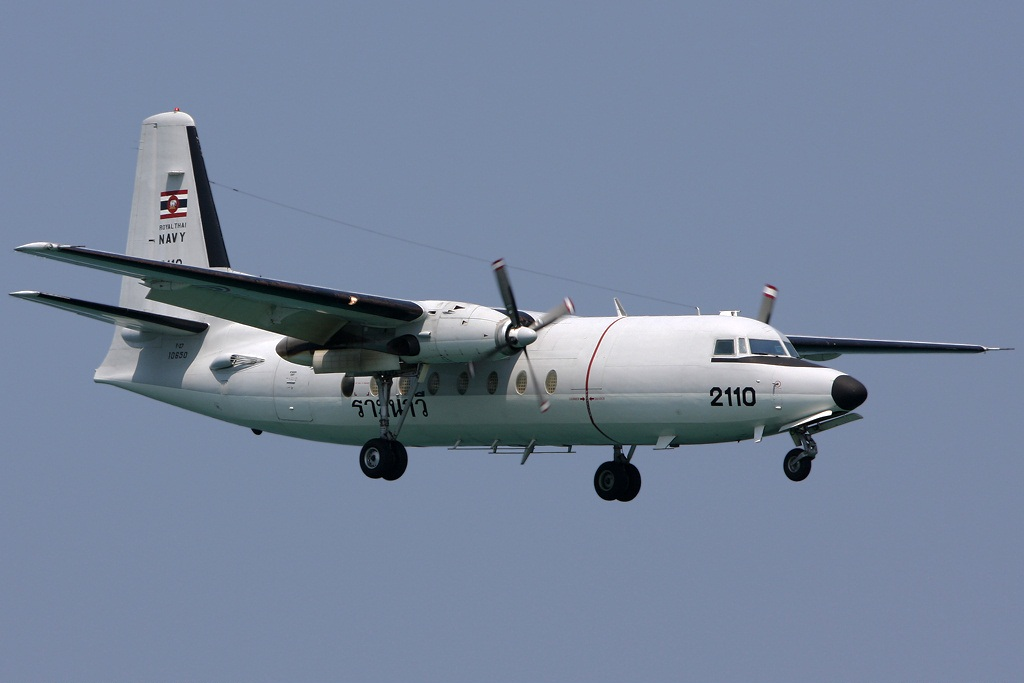
Royal Thai Navy Fokker27-MK 400

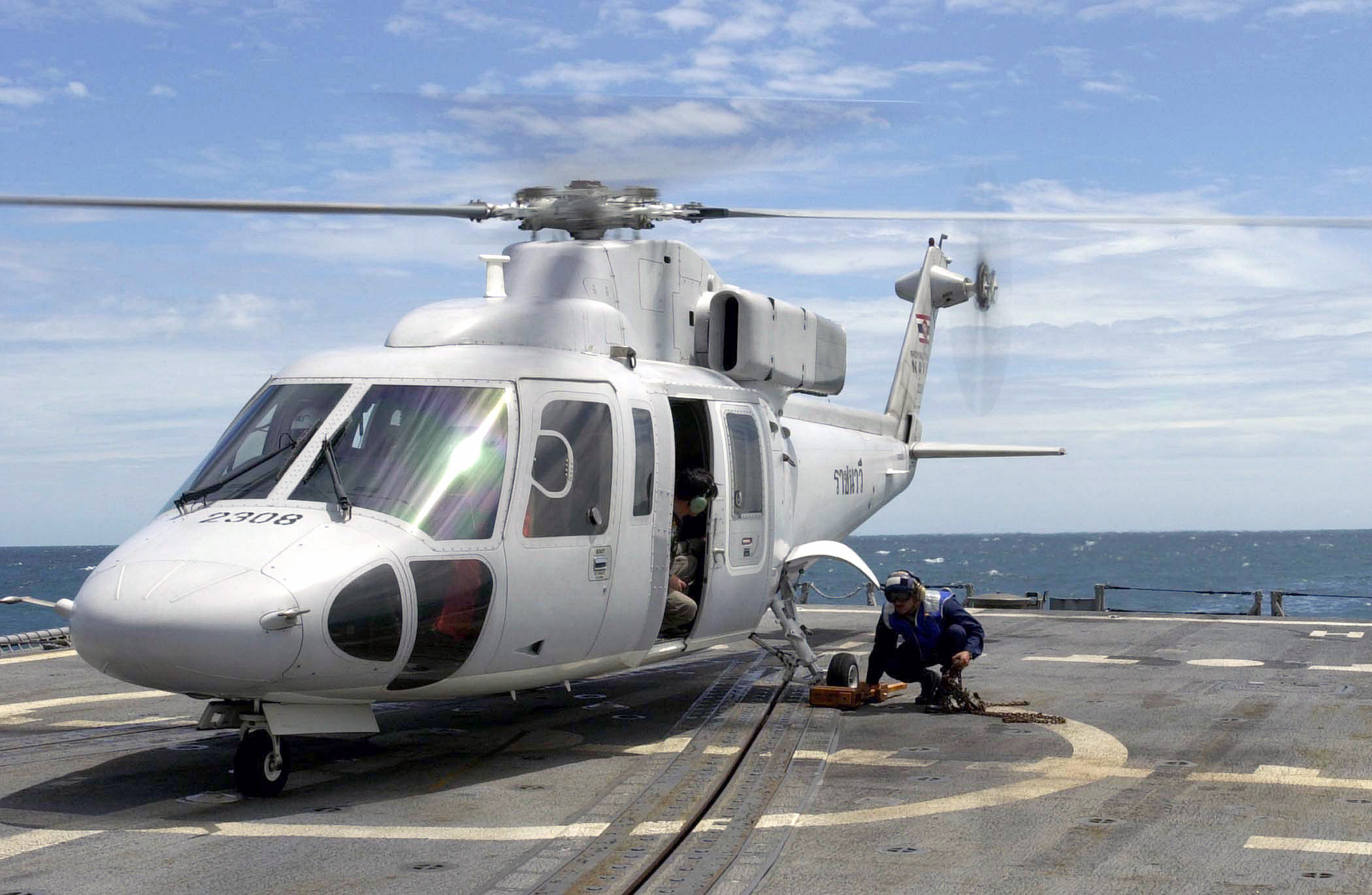
Royal Thai Navy Sikorsky S-76B

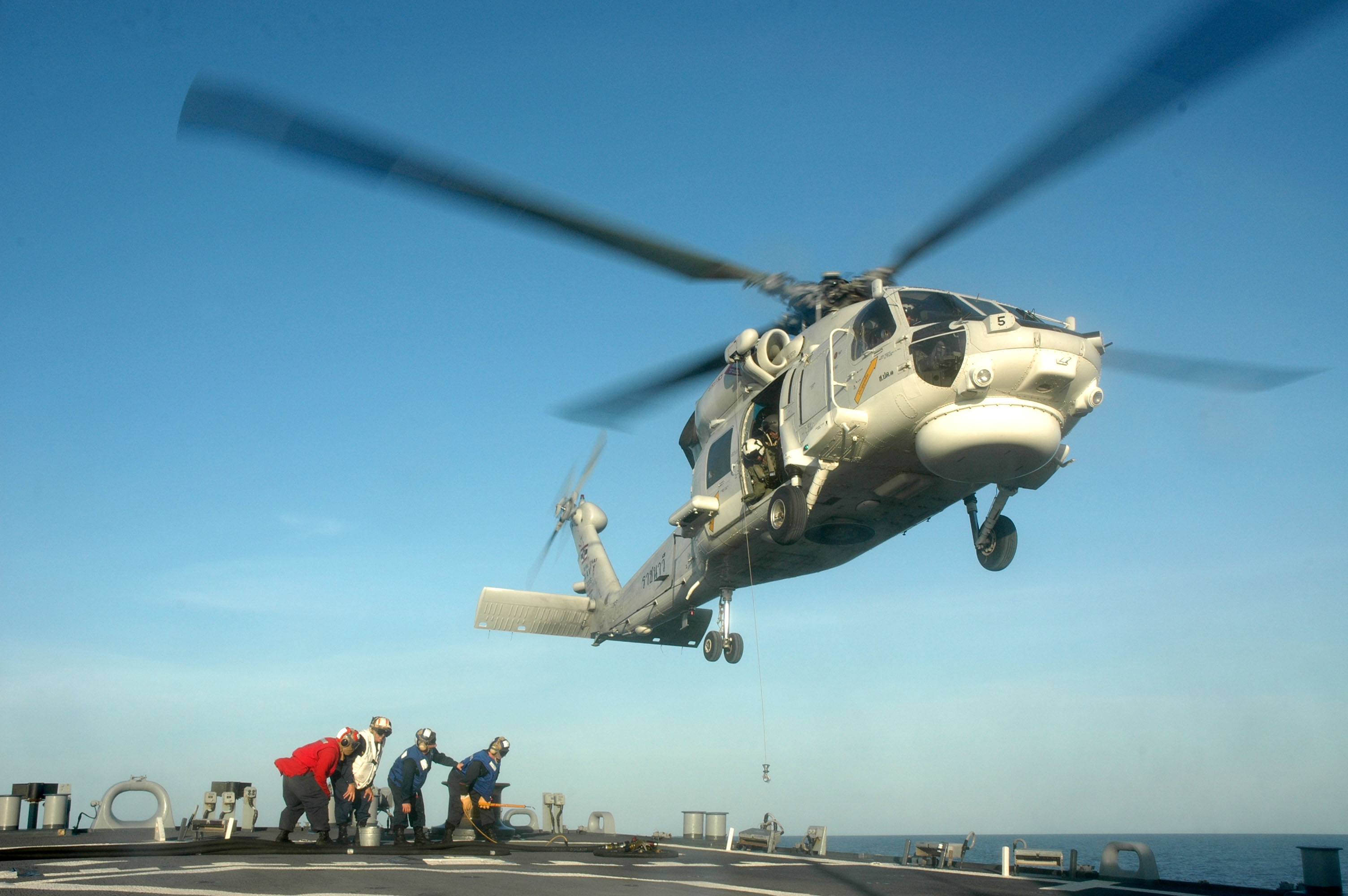
Thai Navy SH-70B Seahawk

The RTN recently has two air wings and one Flying Unit of aircraft carrier HTMS Chakri Naruebet, operating 23 fixed-wing aircraft and 26 helicopters from U-Tapao, Songkhla, and Phuket. The First Royal Thai Navy wing has three squadrons; the Second Royal Thai Navy wing has three squadrons and another wing for HTMS Chakri Naruebet Flying Unit.

Squadron	Status	Role	Type	Aircraft	Number
The First Royal Thai Navy wing
101	Active	SAR	Maritime patrol aircraft	Dornier 228	7
102	Active	ASuW and ASW	Maritime patrol aircraft	Fokker27-MK 200	2
103	Active	Forward air control	Maritime patrol aircraft	Cessna 337 Super Skymaster	9
104	Inactive				
The Second Royal Thai Navy wing
201	Active	Military transport	Maritime patrol aircraft	Fokker27-MK 400 Embraer ERJ-135LR	2 2
202	Active	Military transport	Helicopter	UH-1N Twin Huey H145M	6 5
203	Active	ASuW and Military transport	Helicopter	SH-76B Seahawk Super Lynx 300	5 2
HTMS Chakri Naruebet Flying Unit
1	Inactive				
2	Active	ASW and Military transport	Helicopter	SH-70B Seahawk MH-60S Knighthawk	6 2

=== Riverine Patrol Regiment ===
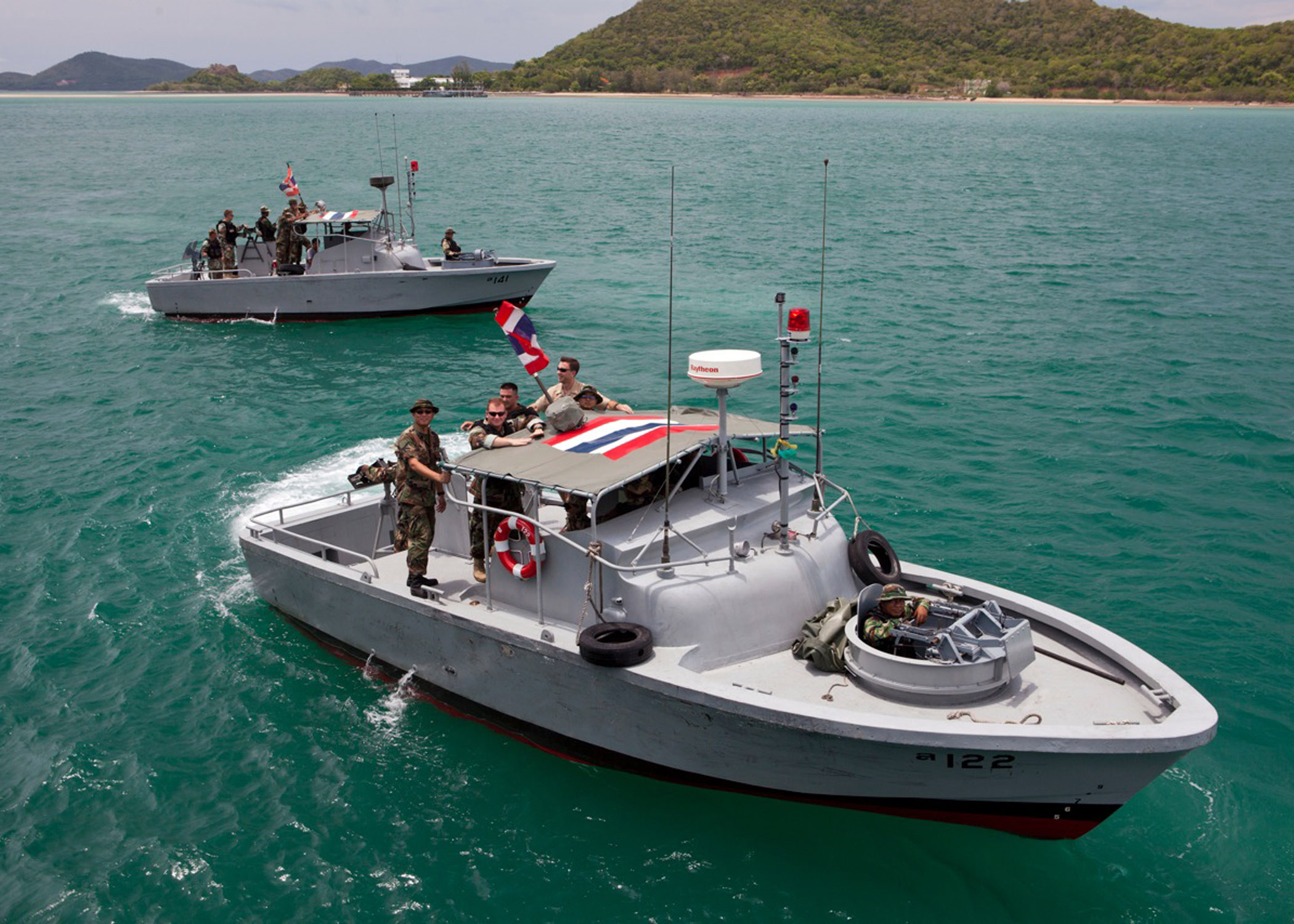
Royal Thai Navy riverine sailors

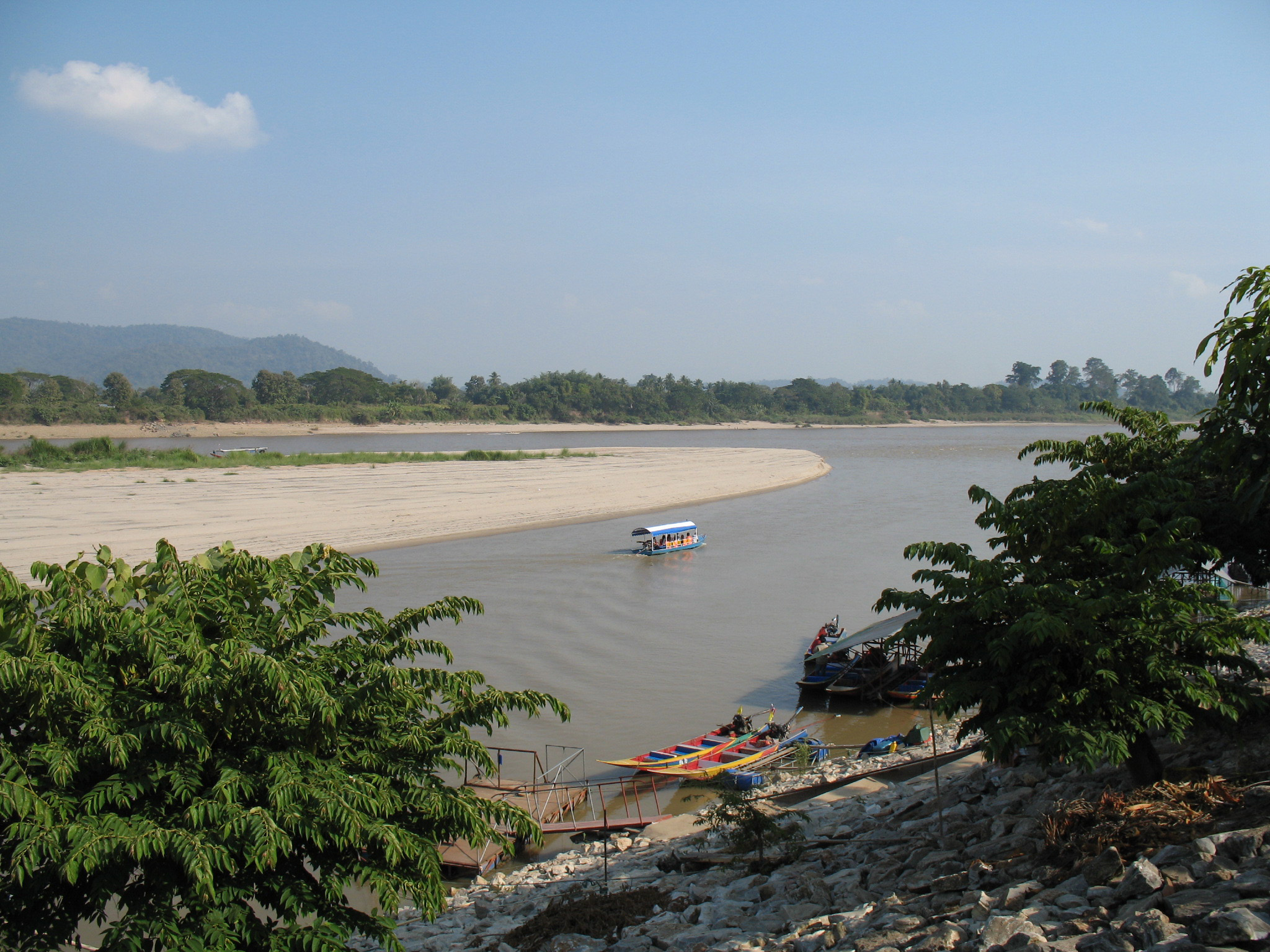
Golden Triangle, Chiang Saen

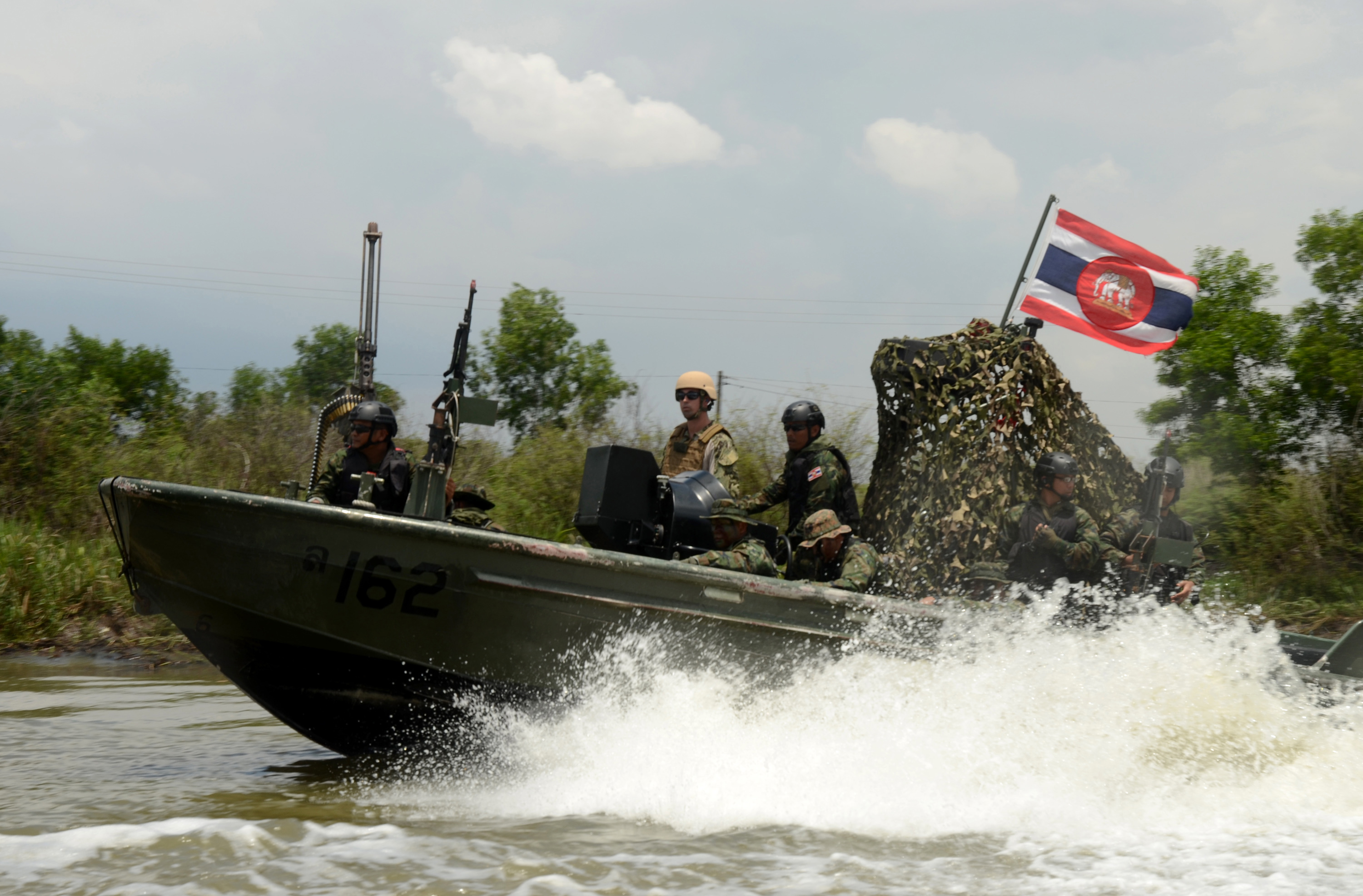
Nakhon Nayok River

The Royal Thai Navy RTN Riverine Patrol Regiment keeps the peace, prevents illegal immigration, human trafficking, drug smuggling or any other threats to national security on the Chao Phraya and Mekong Rivers and elsewhere. Royal Thai Navy Riverine Patrol detachments are stationed in several provinces:

Boat Station / Pier	District	Province	Department
Royal Thai Navy Riverine Patrol Regiment
Riverine Patrol Regiment Pier	Bangkok Noi	Bangkok	Riverine Patrol Regiment
Chiang Saen Boat Station	Chiang Saen	Chiang Rai	Mekong Riverine Unit
Chiang Khong Boat Station	Chiang Khong	Chiang Rai	Mekong Riverine Unit
Chiang Khan Boat Station	Chiang Khan	Loei	Mekong Riverine Unit
Sangkhom Boat Station	Sangkhom	Nong Khai	Mekong Riverine Unit
Nong Khai Boat Station	Mueang Nong Khai	Nong Khai	Mekong Riverine Unit
Rattanawapi Boat Station	Rattanawapi	Nong Khai	Mekong Riverine Unit
Phon Phisai Boat Station	Phon Phisai	Nong Khai	Mekong Riverine Unit
Si Chiang Mai Boat Station	Si Chiang Mai	Nong Khai	Mekong Riverine Unit
Bueng Kan Boat Station	Mueang Bueng Kan	Bueng Kan	Mekong Riverine Unit
Ban Phaeng Boat Station	Ban Phaeng	Nakhon Phanom	Mekong Riverine Unit
Nakhon Phanom Boat Station	Mueang Nakhon Phanom	Nakhon Phanom	Mekong Riverine Unit
That Phanom Boat Station	That Phanom	Nakhon Phanom	Mekong Riverine Unit
Mukdahan Boat Station	Mueang Mukdahan	Mukdahan	Mekong Riverine Unit
Khemarat Boat Station	Khemarat	Ubon Ratchathani	Mekong Riverine Unit
Khong Chiam Boat Station	Khong Chiam	Ubon Ratchathani	Mekong Riverine Unit

=== Royal Thai Naval Academy ===
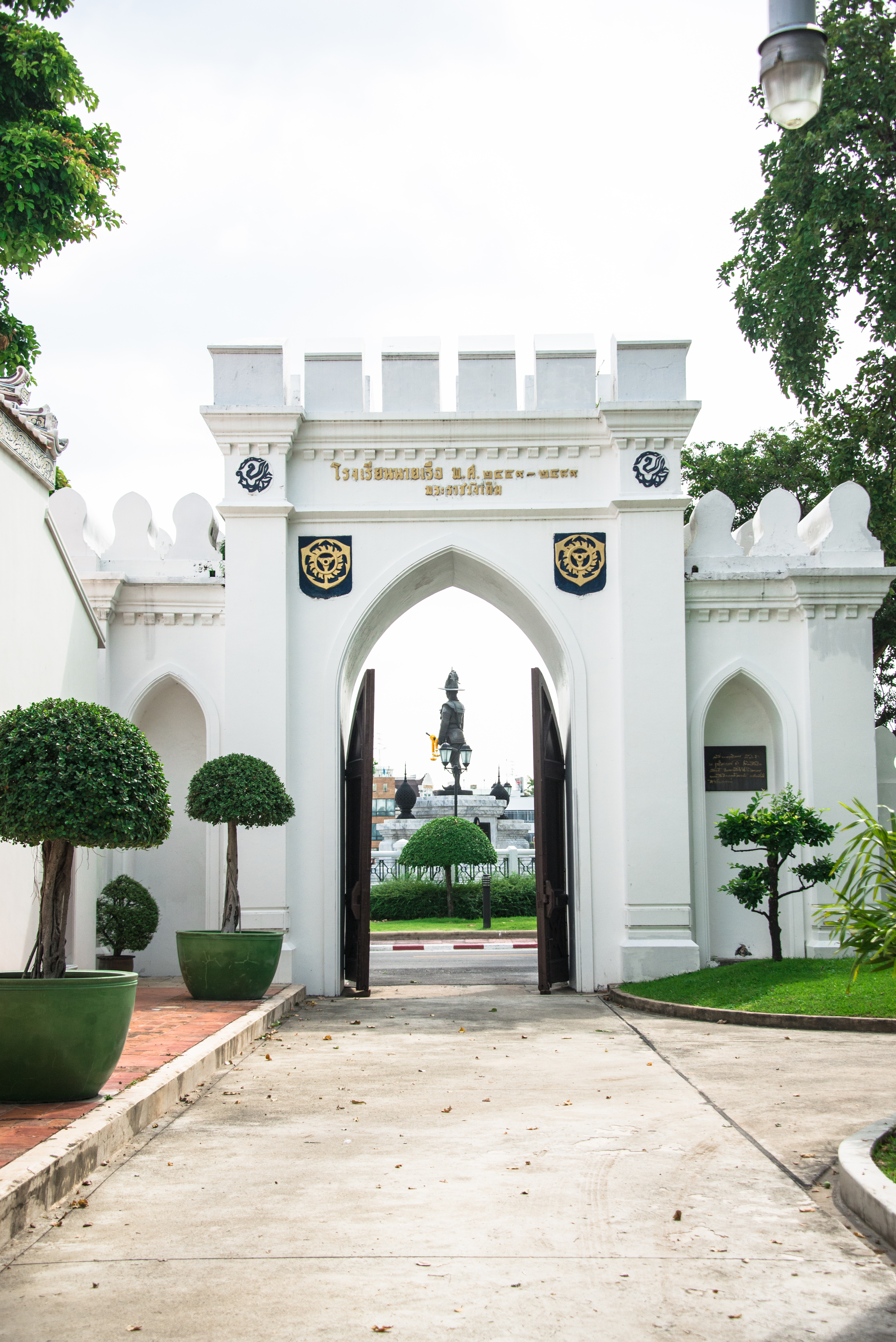
Royal Thai Naval Academy (1906–1952) at Phra Racha Wang Derm.

The Royal Thai Naval Academy in Samut Prakan was established by King Chulalongkorn (Rama V) in 1898, Those who want to enter the academy first have to pass the entrance exam, after which they join a three-year preparatory program at the Armed Forces Academies Preparatory School where they study together with army, air force, and police cadets. On successful completion, they enter the academy. After graduation, they attend a further one-year advanced course at Sattahip that leads to a graduate diploma in naval science. On completion of this course, they are ready to work as officers in the Royal Thai Navy or Royal Thai Marine Corps. Cadets graduate with a bachelor's degree in engineering or science and are commissioned in the Royal Thai Navy with the rank of ensign (sub-lieutenant). Together with graduates of the other armed forces and police academies they receive their swords from the king personally or the king's representative. Selected first-year cadets of the RTNA are awarded scholarships to study at naval academies abroad. On their return to Thailand they start working as officers in the Royal Thai Navy straightaway.

=== Naval Medical Department ===
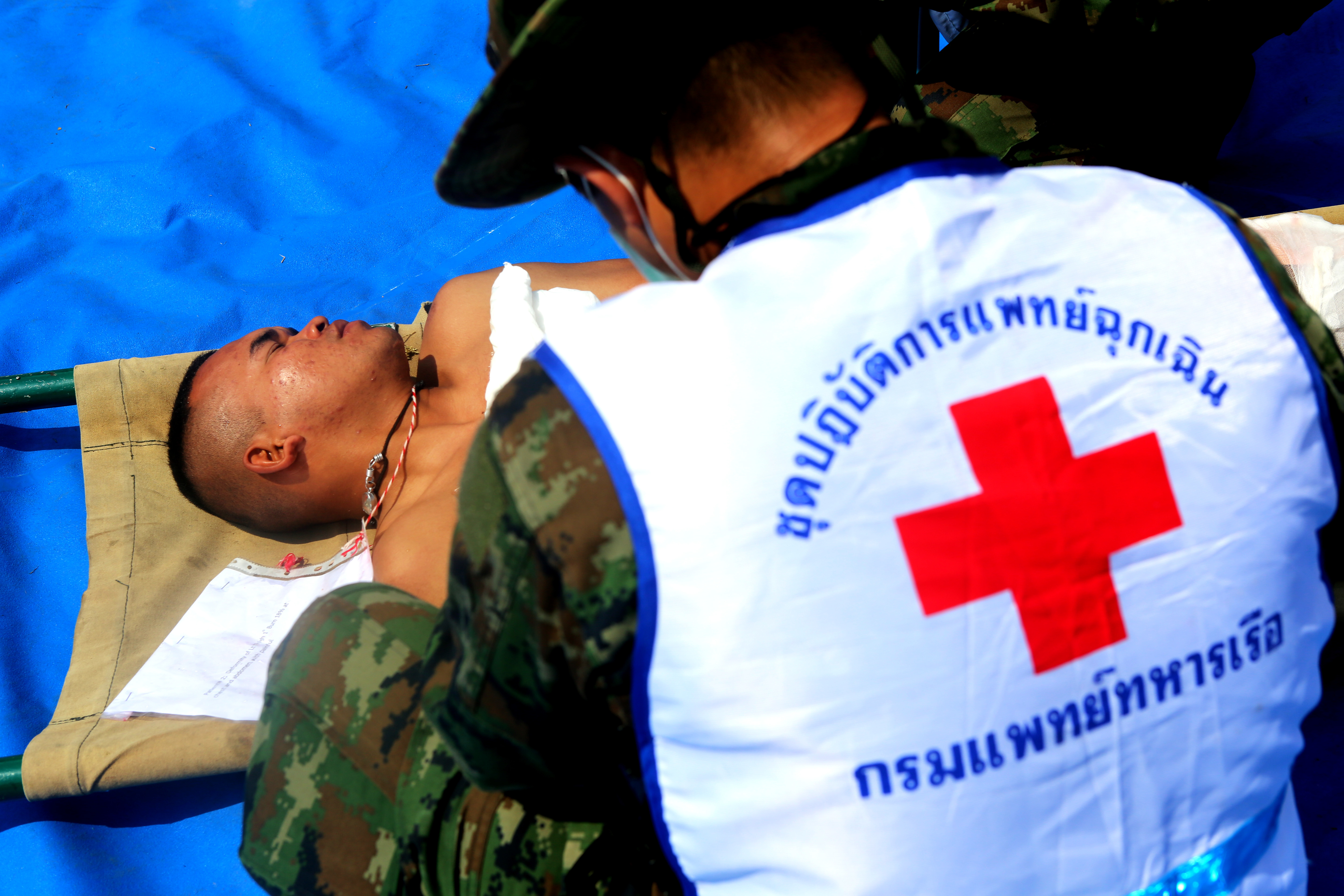
A Royal Thai medical nurse

The Naval Medical Department was first set up on 1 April 1890 and is headquartered at Somdech Phra Pinklao Hospital in Bangkok. It provides medical services for sailors of the Royal Thai Navy and operates a number of hospitals in Thailand including Queen Sirikit Naval Hospital in Chonburi, opened on 20 November 1995.

=== Royal Thai Navy Music Division ===
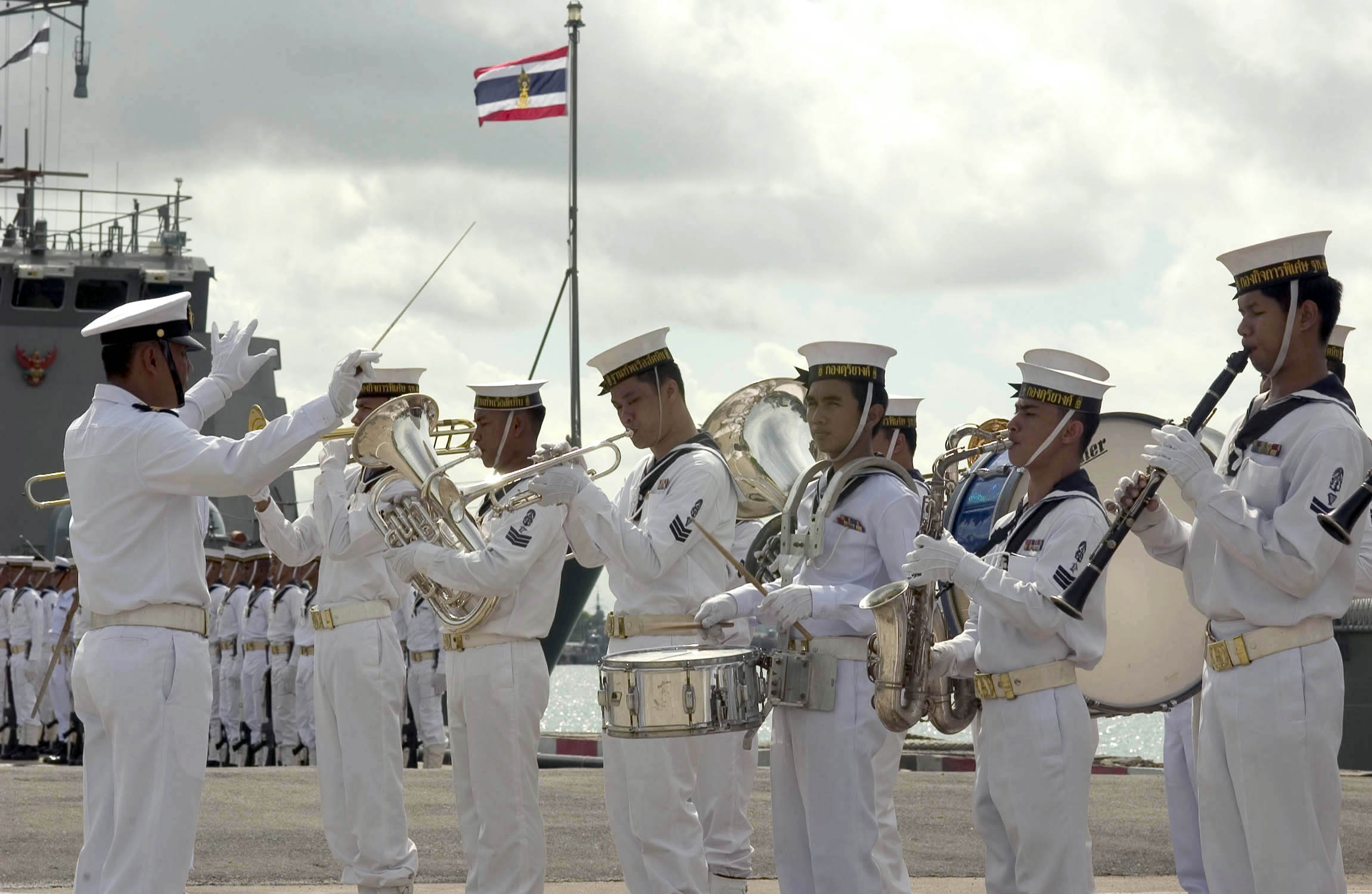
A military music band of the Royal Thai Navy.

A Royal Thai Navy band has existed since the RTN was only a naval department of the Royal Thai Army. Its began with the creation of the "Naval Trumpet Band" on 10 June 1878, with the arrival of the new royal yacht Vesatri and her captain, M. Fusco, who later was one of the training instructors.

Captain Fusco had the duty to stage musicals for King Rama V when the king traveled by sea, as when King Chulalongkorn visited Europe in 1897. The government assigned the young ensemble under the command of Captain Fusco to the Royal Yacht Maha Chakri' for the voyage to Europe. This band would later become the basis of the Royal Thai Navy Music Division of the RTN Bangkok Naval Base. Today, the RTNMD stations bands in all naval bases and installations, as well as in educational institutions.

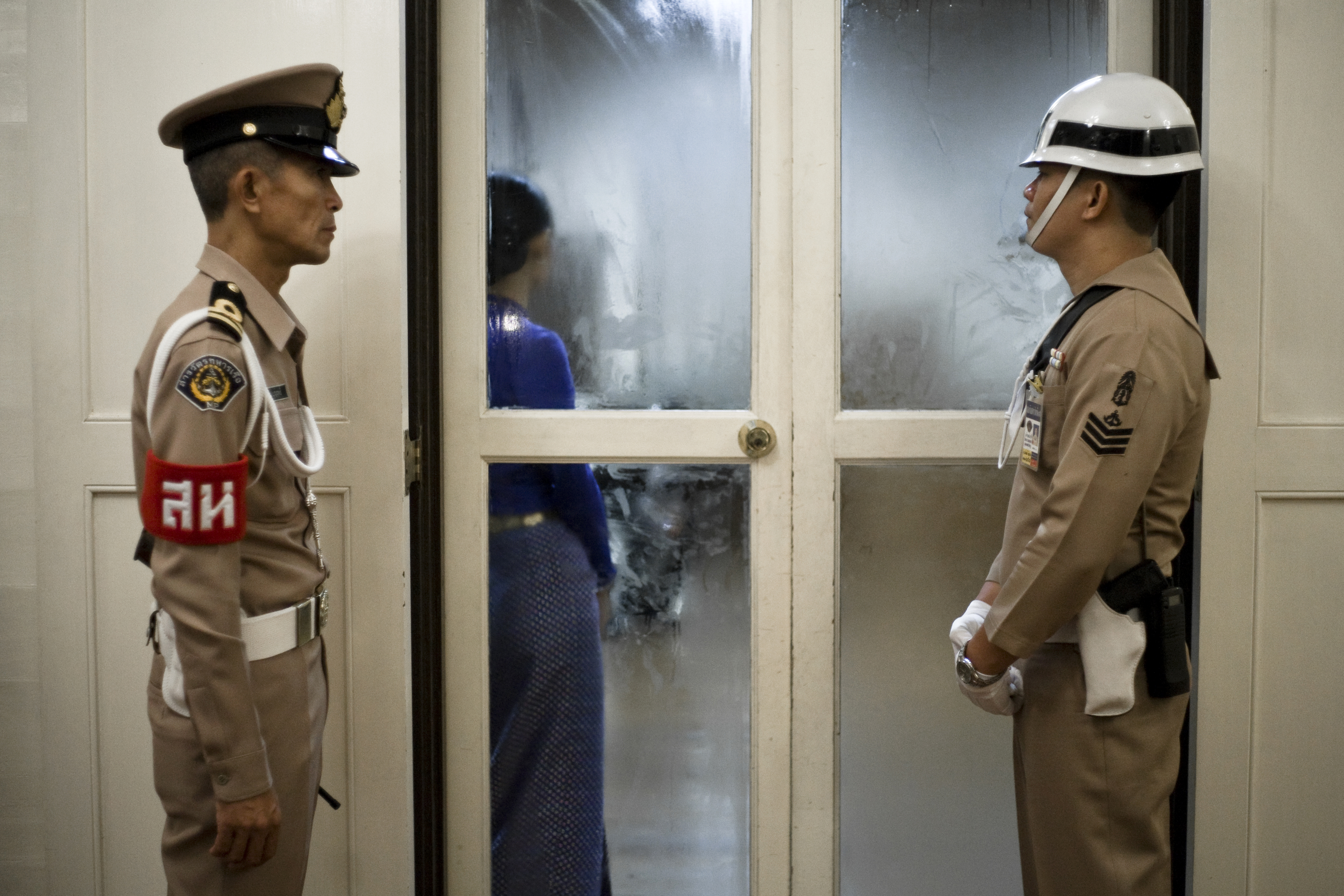
Naval military police

=== Naval Military Police Regiment ===
The navy was the first branch of the Thai military to create a military police unit. The naval military police was established at the order of Marshal Admiral Paribatra Sukhumbandhu, Prince of Nakhon Sawan, who was a naval commander at that time. The official founding date was on 14 December 1905 by the Department of Mechanical Ships and the Department of Naval Affairs.

== Equipment ==
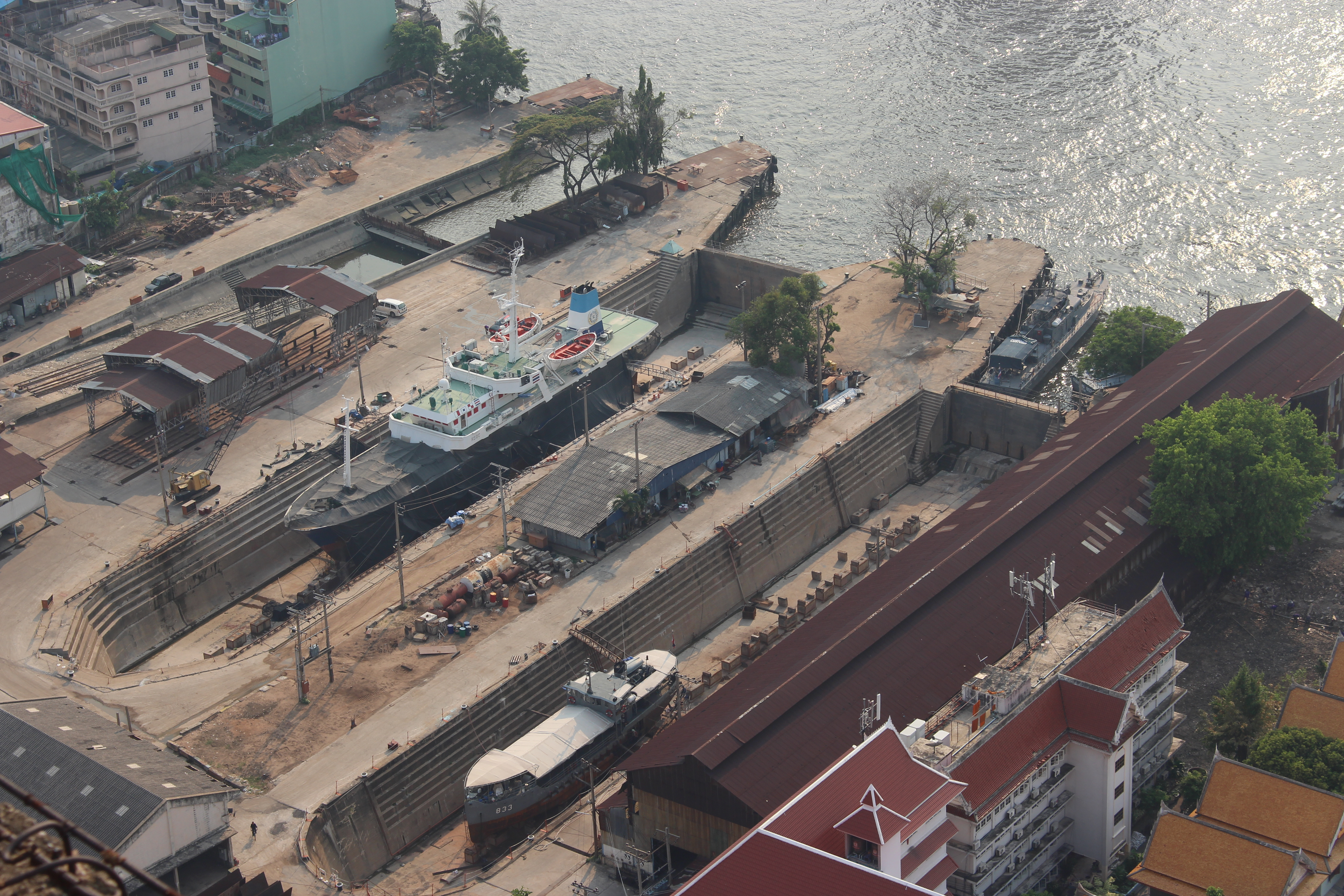
Bangkok Dock Company dockyard

The Royal Thai Navy fleet consists of ships constructed in Canada, China, Germany, Italy, Singapore, South Korea, Spain, the United States, and the United Kingdom. Thai shipbuilding companies and RTN dockyards such as Mahidol Adulyadej Naval Dockyard, Asian Marine Services, Marsun Shipbuilding, Italthai Marine, and Bangkok Dock also have the capability to construct vessels.

== Humanitarian relief operations ==
Thailand worked with more than 60 nations in providing help to the Nepali people following an earthquake. Operation Sahayogi Haat ('helping hands') was a US military relief operation delivering humanitarian assistance to victims of the April and May 2015 Nepal earthquakes. The Royal Thai Navy assisted relief efforts. A magnitude 7.8 earthquake struck the region of Kathmandu in Nepal on 25 April 2015. Operation Sahayogi Haat for humanitarian relief operations was put into action by Joint Task Force 505 on 6 May 2015.

== Royal Barges ==
The royal barge is the type of vessel for Thailand's Royal Barge Procession, when is a ceremony of both religious and royal significance which has taken place for almost 700 years when was the earliest historical evidence of royal barges dates from the Sukhothai period (1238–1438). The royal barges are a blend of craftsmanship and traditional Thai art. The Royal Barge Procession takes place rarely, marking only the most significant cultural and religious events.

Royal barge Narai Song Suban Ratchakan Thi Kao or the royal barge Narai Song Suban HM King Rama IX is the only barge out of four royal barges which was built under commission by the Royal Thai Navy, along with the Thai Department of Fine Arts.

She was built during the reign of HM King Rama IX Bhumibol Adulyadej, who laid the keel in 1994. Thus Narai Song Suban HM King Rama IX was launched on 6 May 1996 to be commissioned and coincide with the celebration of the 50 anniversary of Bhumibol Adulyadej's accession to the throne.

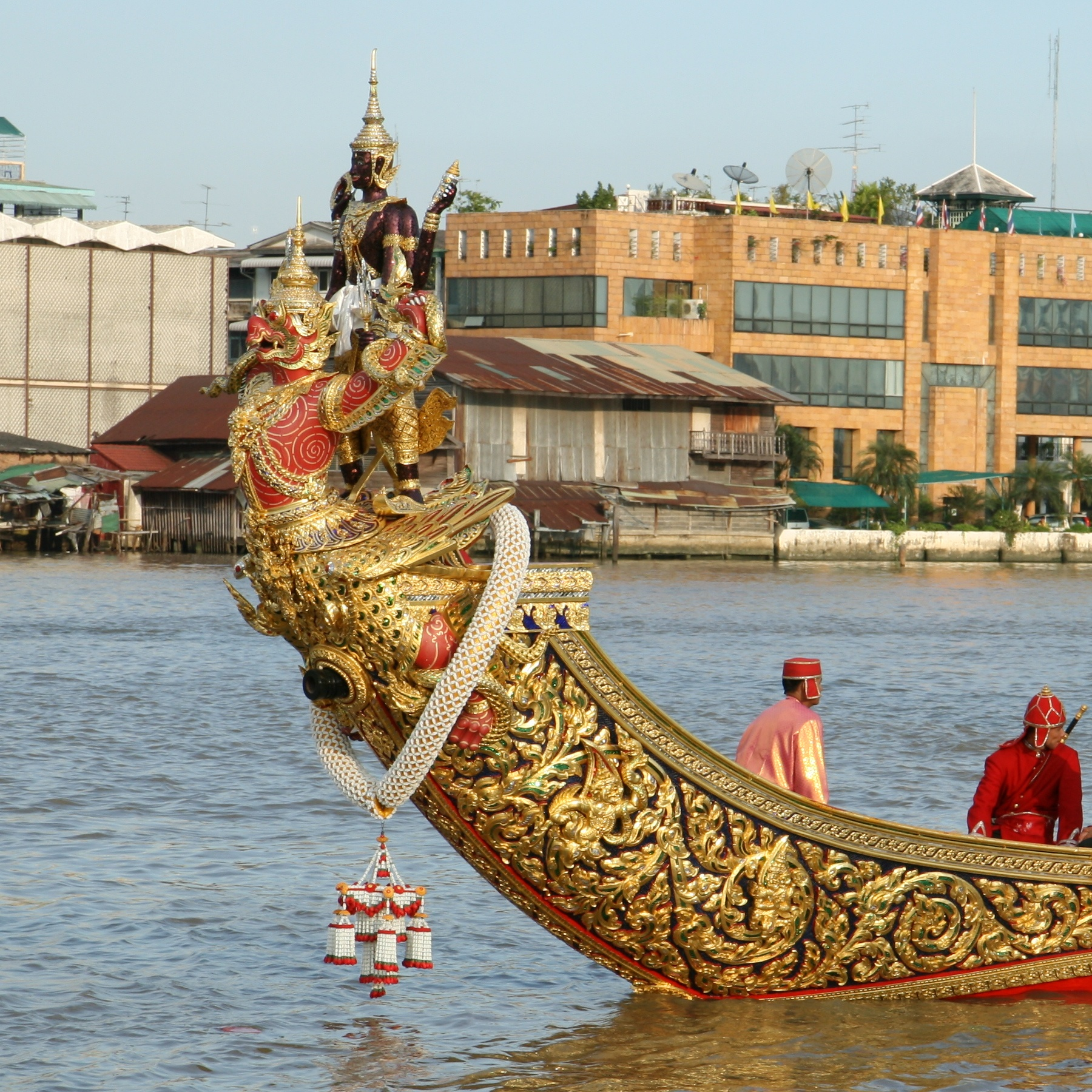
Royal Barge Narai Song Suban HM Rama IX of Thailand.

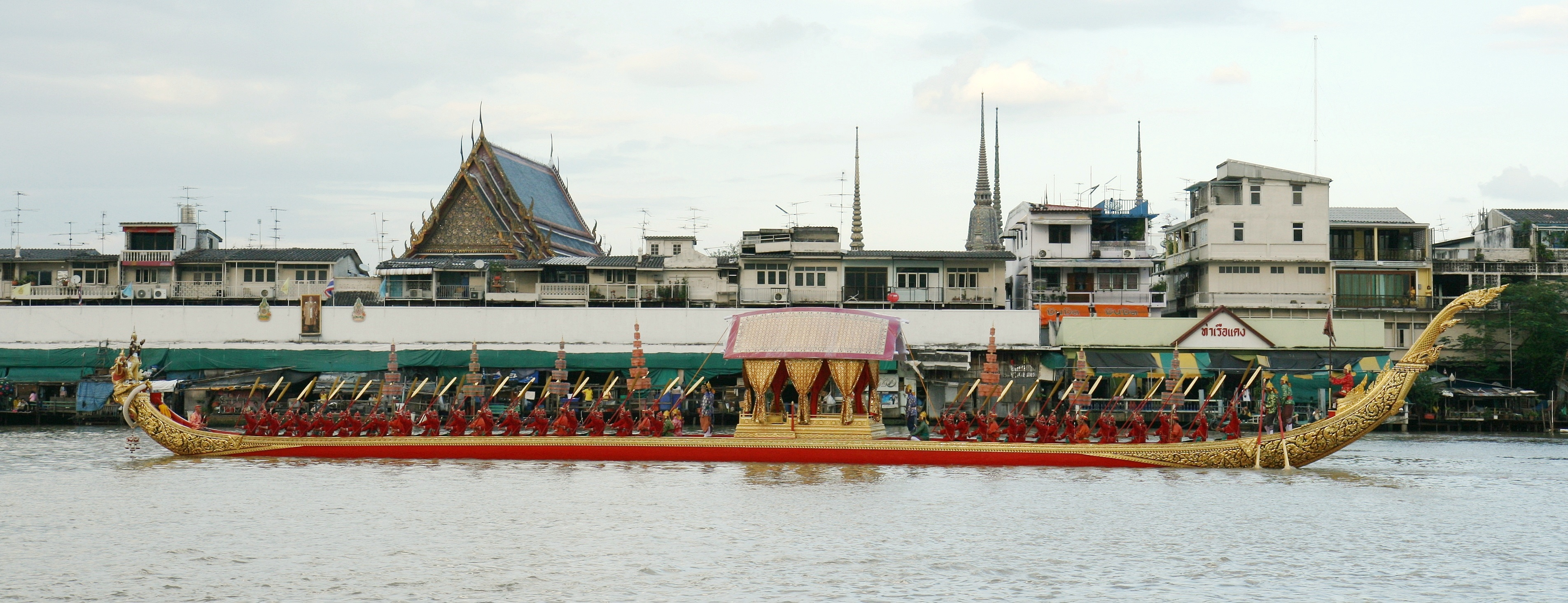
Royal Barge Narai Song Suban HM Rama IX of Thailand. Dress rehearsal on 29 October 2007 for 5 November 2007 Royal Barge Procession for Royal Kathin Ceremony at Wat Arun.

== Budget ==
The RTN budget for FY2021 is 48,289 million baht, up from 47,050M baht in FY2020 and 45,485M baht in FY2019.

== Engagements ==
- Franco-Siamese crisis
  - Paknam incident
- World War I
  - Western Front
  - Asian and Pacific theatre of World War I
- French-Thai War
  - Battle of Koh Chang
- World War II
  - Greater East Asia War
- Palace Rebellion
- Manhattan Rebellion
- Cold War
  - Korean War
  - Vietnam War
  - Communist insurgency in Thailand
  - Communist insurgency in Malaysia
  - Vietnamese border raids in Thailand
  - Thai–Laotian Border War
- Persian Gulf War
- 1999 East Timorese crisis
  - International Force East Timor
- War on terror
  - Operation Enduring Freedom – Horn of Africa
  - Anti-Piracy operation in Gulf of Aden
- Anti-Piracy in strait of Malacca
- Southern Insurgency
- 2003 Phnom Penh riots
- Cambodian–Thai border dispute
- 2015 Rohingya refugee crisis
- Operation Sahayogi Haat
- Tham Luang cave rescue
- 2025 Cambodia–Thailand clashes

== Rank structure ==
=== Commissioned officer ranks ===
The rank insignia of commissioned officers.

Rank group	General / flag officers				Senior officers			Junior officers
Royal Thai Navy
Royal Thai Navy	จอมพลเรือ; Chom phon ruea	พลเรือเอก; Phon ruea ek	พลเรือโท; Phon ruea tho	พลเรือตรี Phon ruea tri	นาวาเอก; Nawa ek	นาวาโท; Nawa tho	นาวาตรี Nawa tri	เรือเอก; Ruea ek	เรือโท; Ruea tho	เรือตรี Ruea tri
Anglicised version	Admiral of the fleet	Admiral	Vice admiral	Rear admiral	Captain	Commander	Lieutenant commander	Lieutenant	Lieutenant junior grade	Sub lieutenant

In documents, it is customary to write "ร.น." (R.N.), an abbreviation of "ราชนาวี" (Royal Navy), after a Naval officer's name, where the rank is addressed with an abbreviation. This is practiced for documents with usage in the Ministry of Defense, but outside of the Royal Thai Navy itself.

Where abbreviation of ranks are not used, such as documents outside of the Ministry of Defense, the suffix "ร.น." is not used.

=== Other ranks ===
The rank insignia of non-commissioned officers and enlisted personnel.

Rank group	Senior NCOs				Junior NCOs		Enlisted
Royal Thai Navy							No insignia
Royal Thai Navy	พันจ่าเอก; Phan cha ek	พันจ่าโท; Phan cha tho	พันจ่าตรี Phan cha tri	จ่าเอก; Cha ek	จ่าโท; Cha tho	จ่าตรี Cha tri	พลทหาร; Phon thahan
Anglicised version	Chief petty officer first class	Chief petty officer second class	Chief petty officer third class	Petty officer first class	Petty officer second class	Petty officer third class	Seaman

== See also ==
- Admiral Prince Abhakara Kiartiwongse, Prince of Chumphon
- Royal Thai Armed Forces Headquarters
- Royal Thai Armed Forces
- Royal Thai Army
- Royal Thai Air Force
- Royal Thai Marine Corps
- Royal Thai Naval Academy
