= List of ship names of the Royal Navy (B) =

This is a list of Royal Navy ship names starting with B.

== B ==
- B1
- B2
- B3
- B4
- B5
- B6
- B7
- B8
- B9
- B10
- B11
- Babet
- Bacchante
- Bacchante II
- Bacchus
- Bachaquero
- Badger
- Badminton
- Badora
- Badsworth
- Bagshot
- Bahama
- Bahamas
- Bala
- Baleine
- Balfour
- Balgay
- Ballahoo
- Ballahou
- Ballarat
- Ballinderry
- Balm
- Balsam
- Baltic
- Baltimore
- Bamborough Castle
- Ban Whatt Hin
- Banbury
- Banchory
- Banff
- Bangor
- Banka
- Bann
- Banshee
- Banterer
- Bantry
- Bantum
- Barbadoes
- Barbadoes Merchant
- Barbados
- Barbara
- Barbara Robertson
- Barbette
- Barbuda
- Barcross
- Barfleur
- Barham
- Bark of Bullen
- Bark of Murlesse
- Barle
- Barlight
- Barnard Castle
- Barnstaple
- Barnwell Castle
- Barossa
- Barracouta
- Barrington
- Barrosa
- Basilisk
- Basing
- Bassingham
- Bastion
- Bat
- Batavia
- Bath
- Bathgate
- Bathurst
- Batman
- Battle
- Battleaxe
- Battler
- Bayano
- Bayfield
- Bayonet
- Bayntun
- Bazely
- Beachampton
- Beachy Head
- Beacon
- Beagle
- Bear
- Beatrice
- Beatty
- Beaufort
- Beaulieu
- Beauly
- Beauly Firth
- Beaumaris
- Beaumont
- Beaver
- Beaver Prize
- Beccles
- Beckford
- Beckwith
- Bedale
- Bedford
- Bedford Galley
- Bedham
- Bedouin
- Bee
- Beehive
- Beelzebub
- Beeston Castle
- Begonia
- Begum
- Belem
- Belette
- Belfast
- Belize
- Belle Isle
- Belle Poule
- Belleisle
- Bellerophon
- Belliqueux
- Bellisarius
- Bellona
- Bellwort
- Belmont
- Belton
- Belvidera
- Belvoir
- Belzebub
- Ben Lomond
- Ben Meidie
- Ben Nevis
- Benbow
- Bend Or
- Bendigo
- Bengal
- Benjamin
- Benjamin & Ann
- Ben-my-Chree
- Bentinck
- Bentley
- Berberis
- Berbice
- Bere Castle
- Beresford
- Bergamot
- Bergere
- Berkeley
- Berkeley Castle
- Bermuda
- Berry
- Berry Head
- Berwick
- Beryl
- Beschermer
- Betony
- Betty
- Beverley
- Bevington
- Bezan
- Bhamo
- Biarritz
- Bicester
- Bickerton
- Bickington
- Biddeford
- Bideford
- Bienfaisant
- Bigbury Bay
- Bihar
- Bildeston
- Bilsthorpe
- Bird
- Birdham
- Birkenhead
- Birmingham
- Bisham
- Biter
- Bittern
- Bittersweet
- Black
- Black Bear
- Black Bull
- Black Dog
- Black Eagle
- Black Joke
- Black Posthorse
- Black Prince
- Black Spread-Eagle
- Black Swan
- Blackburn
- Blackcock
- Blackfly
- Blackmore
- Blackmore Ketch
- Blackmore Lady
- Blackmorevale
- Blackpool
- Blackwall
- Blackwater
- Blackwood
- Blade
- Blake
- Blakeney
- Blanche
- Blandford
- Blankney
- Blast
- Blaxton
- Blaze
- Blazer
- Blean
- Bleasdale
- Blencathra
- Blenheim
- Blessing
- Blickling
- Bligh
- Blonde
- Bloodhound
- Bloom
- Blosse Lynch
- Blossom
- Bluebell
- Blyth
- Boadicea
- Boadicea II
- Bodenham
- Bodiam Castle
- Bold
- Bolebroke
- Bolton
- Bolton Castle
- Bombay
- Bombay Castle
- Boomerang
- Bonaventure
- Bonavoila
- Bonetta
- Bonita
- Bonito
- Bonne Citoyenne
- Bootle
- Borage
- Borde
- Border
- Borealis
- Boreas
- Boreham
- Borer
- Borodino
- Boscawen
- Boscawen II
- Boscawen III
- Bossington
- Boston
- Bostonian
- Botha
- Bottisham
- Bouclier
- Boulogne
- Boulston
- Bouncer
- Bountiful
- Bounty
- Bourbonnaise
- Bourdelais
- Bowes Castle
- Boxer
- Boyne
- Braak
- Braave
- Bradfield
- Bradford
- Braemar Castle
- Braid
- Braithwaite
- Brakel
- Bramber Castle
- Bramble
- Bramham
- Branlebas
- Brantingham
- Brave
- Brave Borderer
- Brave Swordsman
- Bravo
- Brayford
- Brazen
- Bream
- Brearley
- Brecon
- Breconshire
- Breda
- Brenchley
- Brereton
- Brev Drageren
- Brevdrageren
- Briar
- Bridgewater
- Bridgnorth Castle
- Bridlington
- Bridport
- Brigadier
- Brigandine
- Brigantine
- Brigham
- Brighton
- Brighton Belle
- Brighton Queen
- Brilliant
- Brilliant Prize
- Brinkley
- Brinton
- Briseis
- Brisk
- Brissenden
- Bristol
- Britannia
- Britannic
- Britomart
- Briton
- Brixham
- Broederschap
- Broadley
- Broadsword
- Broadwater
- Broadway
- Brock
- Brocklesby
- Broke
- Brolga
- Bronington
- Broom
- Broome
- Broomley
- Brothers
- Brough Castle
- Bruce
- Bruiser
- Bruizer
- Brune
- Brunswick
- Brutus
- Bryansford
- Bryony
- Bucephalus
- Buchan Ness
- Buck
- Buckie
- Buckingham
- Bucklesham
- Buddleia
- Bude
- Buffalo
- Bugloss
- Bull
- Bull dog
- Bulldog
- Bullen
- Bullfinch
- Bullfrog
- Bullhead
- Bullrush
- Bulolo
- Bulrush
- Bulwark
- Burchett
- Burdock
- Burford
- Burges
- Burghead Bay
- Burgonet
- Burley
- Burlington
- Burnaston
- Burnet
- Burnham
- Burnie
- Burslem
- Burton
- Burwell
- Bury
- Buss
- Bustard
- Bustler
- Busy
- Buttercup
- Butterfly
- Buttington
- Buttress
- Buxton
- Buzzard
- Byard
- Byron

== See also ==
- List of aircraft carriers of the Royal Navy
- List of amphibious warfare ships of the Royal Navy
- List of pre-dreadnought battleships of the Royal Navy
- List of dreadnought battleships of the Royal Navy
- List of battlecruisers of the Royal Navy
- List of cruisers of the Royal Navy
- List of destroyers of the Royal Navy
- List of fast patrol boats of the Royal Navy
- List of frigates of the Royal Navy
- List of monitors of the Royal Navy
- List of mine countermeasure vessels of the Royal Navy (includes minesweepers and mine hunters)
- List of Royal Fleet Auxiliary ship names
- List of submarines of the Royal Navy
- List of survey vessels of the Royal Navy
- List of Royal Navy shore establishments
