= HMS Berbice =

Four ships of the Royal Navy have been named HMS Berbice for the Berbice region:

- HMS Berbice (1780) was an American schooner of 121 tons (bm) that the Royal Navy purchased in 1780 and condemned on 12 September 1788. This may have become the next Berbice.
- HMS Berbice (1793) was of 10 guns and 121 tons (bm) and purchased in 1793. She was wrecked in November 1796 on the coast of Dominica. This may have been the previous Berbice, and/or a French schooner captured in 1793.
- HMS Berbice (1804) was the Dutch schooner Serpent of four guns and 78 tons (bm), that HMS Heureux took possession of at Berbice in 1803 at the capitulation of the colony and that the Navy purchased in 1804. Berbice foundered in 1806 off Demerara.
- HMS Berbice (1915), 2,379 GRT, was launched by Harland & Wolff in 1909 for the Royal Mail Steam Packet Company to use in inter-island trade in the Caribbean. The Royal Navy hired her on 9 December 1915 for use as a hospital ship, and purchased her in 1919. She was sold in 1922 and renamed Suntemple. She was sold again in 1924 to United Baltic Corp., who renamed her Baltara. She was wrecked in 1929 at the mouth of the Vistula.

== Also ==
A hired armed ship named Berbice participated in the capture of St Lucia in May 1796.
