= List of ship launches in 1764 =

The list of ship launches in 1764 includes a chronological list of some ships launched in 1764.

| Date | Ship | Class | Builder | Location | Country | Notes |
|---|---|---|---|---|---|---|
| 19 January | Ville de Paris | Second rate | François-Guillaume Clairain des Lauriers | Rochefort | Kingdom of France | For French Navy. |
| 21 January | Lapwing | Cutter | James White | Broadstairs | Great Britain | For Royal Navy. |
| January | Anson | East Indiaman | John Perry | Blackwall Yard | Great Britain | For British East India Company. |
| 3 March | Asia | Third rate | Edward Allin & Thomas Bucknall | Portsmouth Dockyard | Great Britain | For Royal Navy. |
| 3 March | Triumph | Valiant-class ship of the line | Joseph Harris | Woolwich Dockyard | Great Britain | For Royal Navy. |
| 12 April | Prindsesse Wilhelmine Carolina | Fourth rate | | Copenhagen | Denmark-Norway | For Dano-Norwegian Navy. |
| 16 May | Asia | East Indiaman | John Perry | Blackwall Yard | Great Britain | For British East India Company. |
| 29 May | Bucentoro | Man-of-war | | Venice | Republic of Venice | For Venetian Navy. |
| 31 May | Winchelsea | Niger-class frigate | John Williams | Sheerness Dockyard | Great Britain | For Royal Navy. |
| 4 June | Nadezhda Blagopoluchiia | Fifth rate | Ivan I. Afanaseyev | Saint Petersburg | Russia | For Imperial Russian Navy. |
| June | Earl of Pembroke | Collier | Thomas Fishburn | Whitby | Great Britain | For Thomas Millner. |
| 30 June | Wells | Cutter | Philemon Jacobs | Folkestone | Great Britain | For Royal Navy. |
| 11 August | Utile | Ship of the line | Léon Guignace | Bordeaux | Kingdom of France | For French Navy. |
| 13 August | Ardent | Ardent-class ship of the line | Blaydes | Blaydes Yard, Hull | Great Britain | For Royal Navy. |
| 18 August | Velasco | Velasco-class ship of the line | Augustin & Juan de Monteceli | Cartagena | Spain | For Spanish Navy. |
| 27 August | Citoyen | Citoyen-class ship of the line | Joseph-Louis Ollivier | Brest | Kingdom of France | For French Navy. |
| August | Guyane | Ketch | Augustin Pic | Rochefort | Kingdom of France | For French Navy. |
| 7 September | Kite | Cutter | Adam Hayes | Deptford Dockyard | Great Britain | For Royal Navy. |
| 12 September | Dunikier | Jamaicaman | Messrs. Dudman & Barnard | Ipswich | Great Britain | For private owner. |
| 12 September | St Albans | St Albans-class ship of the line | Perry | Blackwall Yard | Great Britain | For Royal Navy. |
| 13 October | Folkestone | Cutter | William Hall | Folkestone | Great Britain | For Royal Navy. |
| 25 October | Robust | Ramillies-class ship of the line | Barnard | Harwich | Great Britain | For Royal Navy. |
| 26 October | Ankerwyke | East Indiaman | John & William Wells | Deptford | Great Britain | For British East India Company. |
| 10 November | Russell | Ramillies-class ship of the line | West | Deptford | Great Britain | For Royal Navy. |
| 10 December | Grenville | East Indiaman | John Wells | Deptford | Great Britain | For British East India Company. |
| December | Pacific | East Indiaman | John Wells | Deptford | Great Britain | For British East India Company. |
| Unknown date | Active | Full-rigged ship | | Shoreham-by-Sea | Great Britain | For private owner. |
| Unknown date | Admiraal Generaal | Third rate | | Amsterdam | Dutch Republic | For Dutch Navy. |
| Unknown date | Amsterdam | Third rate | | location | Dutch Republic | For Dutch Navy. |
| Unknown date | Artésien | Artésien-class ship of the line | Joseph Ollivier | Brest | Kingdom of France | For French Navy. |
| Unknown date | Bird | Sloop-of-war | Henry Bird | Deptford Dockyard | Great Britain | For Royal Navy. |
| Unknown date | Boston | Schooner | | Navy Island Royal Naval Shipyard | (Kingdom of Great Britain) Province of Quebec | For Royal Navy. |
| Unknown date | Brotherly Love | Brig | | | Great Britain | For private owner. |
| Unknown date | Concorde | Merchantman | John Brockbank | Lancaster | Great Britain | For private owner. |
| Unknown date | Enigheten | Sixth rate | Harald Sohlberg | Djurgården | Sweden | For Royal Swedish Navy. |
| Unknown date | Industrious Bee | Brigantine | | Bristol | Great Britain | For Clapman & Co. |
| Unknown date | Dorothee | Dorade-class gabarre | Gaspard-Seraphim Rolland | Brest | Kingdom of France | For French Navy. |
| Unknown date | Landskroon | East Indiaman | | | Dutch Republic | For Dutch East India Company. |
| Unknown date | Ecluse | Digue-class gabarre | | Havre de Grâce | Kingdom of France | For French Navy. |
| Unknown date | Singe | Cat | | Rochefort | Kingdom of France | For French Navy. |
| Unknown date | Oden | Hemmema | | | Sweden | For Royal Swedish Navy. |
| Unknown date | Polly | Merchantman | | Shoreham-by-Sea | Great Britain | For Private owner. |
| Unknown date | Restoration | Full-rigged ship | | Bombay | India | For British East India Company. |
| Unknown date | Royal Charlotte | Sloop of war | | Navy Island Royal Naval Shipyard | (Kingdom of Great Britain) Province of Quebec | For Royal Navy. |
| Unknown date | Saint John | Schooner | | | Great Britain | For Royal Navy. |
| Unknown date | Snappupp | Cutter | | Sveaborg | Sweden | For Royal Swedish Navy. |
| Unknown date | Tor | Turuma | | | Sweden | For Royal Swedish Navy. |
| Unknown date | Truelove | Full-rigged ship | | | Thirteen Colonies | For private owner. |
| Unknown date | Wallace | Full-rigged ship | | Bombay | India | For private owner. |
