= Biter =

Biter or Biters may refer to:

== Art, entertainment, and media ==
- Biter, the sword Orcrist from J. R. R. Tolkien's Middle-earth
- Biters (band)
- Biters, the hostile native inhabitants of the game Factorio

== People ==
- Aytaç Biter Turkish racing car driver

== Vessels ==
- HMS Biter, the name of several ships of the British Royal Navy, including:
  - HMS Biter (D97)
  - HMS Biter (P270)
