= Blackpool (disambiguation) =

Blackpool is a seaside town in England, United Kingdom.

Blackpool, black pool, or Black Pool may also refer to:

== Places ==
=== United Kingdom ===
- Blackpool (UK Parliament constituency), a former parliamentary constituency
- Blackpool, Devon, England, United Kingdom
- Blackpool, Pembrokeshire, Wales, United Kingdom, a location
- Borough of Blackpool, a district of Lancashire

=== Elsewhere ===
- Blackpool, New Zealand, a settlement
- Blackpool, Cork, a suburb of Cork, Ireland
- Black Pool, a hotspring in Yellowstone National Park, United States
- Champlain–St. Bernard de Lacolle Border Crossing between Quebec and New York, known colloquially as "Blackpool"

== Arts, entertainment, and media ==
- Blackpool (TV serial), a 2004 BBC television drama series

== Finance ==
- Dark pool, also known as black pool

== Military ==
- HMS Blackpool, the name of two ships of the Royal Navy

== Sports ==
- Black pool, a form of pocket billiards
- A.F.C. Blackpool, an English football club
- Blackpool F.C. (South Africa), a South African football club
- Blackpool F.C., an English football club
- Blackpool Panthers, a rugby league club
- Mighty Blackpool F.C., a Sierra Leonean football club
