= DE16 =

DE16 may refer to:

- ARC Boyaca (DE-16), a Columbia navy ship purchased from the U.S. Navy in 1972, originally launched in 1956 as USS Hartley (DE-1029)
- Delaware Route 16
- USS Edgar G. Chase (DE-16), a U.S. Navy ship launched 1942, decommissioned 1945, scrapped 1947
