= Bootle (disambiguation) =

Bootle is a town within the Metropolitan Borough of Sefton near Liverpool, England.

Bootle may also refer to:

- Associated with the town of Bootle:
  - Bootle F.C., a football club
  - Bootle F.C. (1879), a football club
  - Bootle (UK Parliament constituency)
  - HMS Bootle, two ships of the Royal Navy

== Other uses ==
- Bootle, Cumbria, England, a village
- William Augustus Bootle (1902–2005), American judge
- Dicaprio Bootle (born 1997), American football player
- Roger Bootle (born 1952), British economist and a weekly columnist for the Daily Telegraph
