= Blackpool South =

Blackpool South can refer to

- Blackpool South (UK Parliament constituency)
- Blackpool South railway station

Both of these meanings relate to Blackpool, a town in North-west England. For other places of this name see Blackpool (disambiguation).
