= Merry Andrew =

Merry Andrew may refer to:

== Film, television and theatre ==
- Merry Andrew (film), a 1958 musical comedy
- Merry Andrew, a play by Lewis Beach used as a basis for the 1934 film Handy Andy
- Merry Andrew, a fictional character in the TV series London

== Music ==
- Merry Andrew, a 2006 album by Yuko Ando
- "Merry Andrew", a 1940 piano piece by Bartók in his Mikrokosmos
- "Merry Andrew", a 1919 piano piece by John Ireland
- "Merry Andrew" a 1928 arrangement of a dance piece from Rosalie by by George Gershwin
- Merry Andrew, a 1940 overture by William Henry Reed

== Other uses ==
- a clown, once purported to be Andrew Boorde, 16th century English traveller
- Merry Andrew, a paddle tug later known as HMS Bustler (1853)
- Merry Andrew, pen name of Eleanor Farjeon (1881–1965), English author
- Merry Andrew, a horse, foal of Bartlett's Childers, an important Thoroughbred sire in the 18th century
- Merry-Andrew, a 1915 book by Keble Howard

== See also ==
- Clown
