= Bideford (disambiguation) =

Bideford is a coastal town in Devon, England.

Bideford may also refer to:

- Bideford, New Zealand, a small rural settlement in the Wairarapa region
- Ellerslie-Bideford, Prince Edward Island, Canada, a former municipality
- HMS Bideford, various ships of Britain's Royal Navy
- Bideford railway station, former station in the Devon town
- Bideford A.F.C., football club in the Devon town
- Bideford RFC, rugby union club in the Devon town

== See also ==
- Biddeford, Maine, United States, a city
