= Barrosa =

Barrosa may refer to:

- HMS Barrosa (D68)
- Battle of Barrosa
- Barrosa, a parish of Portugal
- The Barrosã, a Portuguese breed of cattle

== See also ==
- Barossa (disambiguation)
