= Bonetta =

Bonetta may refer to:

- Sarah Forbes Bonetta (1843–1880) a West African Egbado princess of the Yoruba people
- Bonetta-class sloop, a class of three sloops-of war built for the Royal Navy between 1755 and 1756
- Bonetta group sloop, a batch of eight sloops-of war built for the Royal Navy during 1732

== See also ==
- HMS Bonetta – any one of 13 vessels of the British Royal Navy
- Bonetti (disambiguation)
