= Buttercup (disambiguation) =

Buttercups are several species of the genus Ranunculus.

Buttercup may also refer to:

== Characters ==
- Buttercup (Toy Story), a character in Toy Story 3
- Princess Buttercup, a character in the novel The Princess Bride and film based on it
- Buttercup Utonium, a character in The Powerpuff Girls
  - Buttercup (Kaoru Matsubara), a character in Powerpuff Girls Z
- Little Buttercup (Mrs. Cripps), a character in the musical H.M.S. Pinafore
- Buttercup, a diabetic horse in the film Half Baked

== Places ==
- Buttercup, Belize, a village in the Belize District
- Buttercup Mountain, a mountain in Idaho

== Vehicles ==
- Wittman Buttercup, a homebuilt aircraft
- HMS Buttercup (K193), a Flower-class corvette launched in 1941

== Art, entertainment, and media ==
- "Buttercup", a song by YouTuber and musician Jack Stauber
- Buttercup (TV series), a Filipino television series
- Buttercup (fairy tale), a Norwegian fairy tale

== Other plants ==
- Buttercups, the common name for Verticordia aurea
- Buttercup tree, the common name for Cochlospermum religiosum
- Bermuda buttercup, the common name for Oxalis pes-caprae

== People with the given name ==
- Buttercup Dickerson (1858–1920), 19th-century Major League Baseball outfielder

== See also ==
- Buttercup Festival, a webcomic by David Troupes
- Buttercup squash, a variety of the winter squash species Cucurbita maxima
- HMS Buttercup, a list of vessels built for the Royal Navy
- Little Buttercup or Santa Fe No. 5, an 0-4-0 steam locomotive
- Sicilian Buttercup chicken, a breed of chicken
- Peanut butter cup, a chocolate candy
- "Build Me Up Buttercup", 1968 single by The Foundations
