= List of ships named Barrosa =

Several ships have been named Barrosa (or Barrossa, or Barossa, or Barosa), for the Battle of Barrosa (5 March 1811):

- Barrosa (1811 ship) was launched at Cossipore. She sailed to England and then made six voyages for the British East India Company (EIC). After the EIC gave up its maritime activities in 1833-1834, Barossa became a transport. She made three voyages transporting convicts to Australia. She was lost in 1847.
- Barossa was an iron clipper of 1019 GRT/968 NRT launched at Sunderland in 1873 for T.B. White.

== See also ==
- HMS Barossa - one of four vessels of the Royal Navy by that name
