= HMS Burges =

Two ship of the Royal Navy has borne the name HMS Burges,

- HMS Burges (BDE16) was a Captain-class frigate. She was however retained by the US Navy as the Evarts-class destroyer escort USS Edgar G. Chase.
- HMS Burges (K347) was a Captain-class frigate. She was launched in 1943, returned to the US Navy in 1945 and scrapped in 1946.
