= K255 =

K255 or K-255 may refer to:

- K-255 (Kansas highway), a state highway in Kansas
- HMS Ballinderry (K255), a former UK Royal Navy ship
