= Boudica (disambiguation) =

Boudica (formerly latinised Boadicea) was a 1st-century queen of the British Iceni tribe.

Boadicea, Boudica or Boudicca may also refer to:

== Arts and entertainment ==
- "Boadicea", a song by Enya (released 1987)
- Boudica (2003 film), a television film
- Boudica (2023 film), a British film
- Boadicea and Her Daughters, a 1902 statue in London

== Transport ==
- Boadicea, a British passenger brig wrecked in 1816
- BOADICEA - the British Airways computer system, developed by Peter Hermon at BOAC from 1968 from an international version of the IBM Programmed Airline Reservations System, which remains today across the world
- G-ACOX Boadicea, a Boulton & Paul P.71A mailplane (1935–1936)
- HMS Boadicea, any of four UK warships
- MV Boudicca, a Norwegian-built cruise ship (2005–2021)
- SS Boadicea, a ship renamed SS Marquette in 1898

== Zoology ==
- Boadicea (moth), an insect genus
