= Belette =

Belette, weasel in French, may refer to:

- HMS Belette (disambiguation)
- La Belette (disambiguation)
