= French ship Borée =

Six ships of the French Navy have borne the name of Borée, in honour of Boreas.

== French ships named Borée ==
- Borée (1734), a 64-gun ship of the line
- Borée (1785), a Téméraire-class ship of the line
- Borée (1805), a Téméraire-class ship of the line built on an updated design sometimes called Borée class.
- Borée (1901), a Cyclone-class destroyer
- Mistral (1901) (1901), an armoured Cyclone-class destroyer, briefly bore the name at the end of her career
- Borée (1990), a patrol boat of the French customs
Ships of the French Navy named Borée
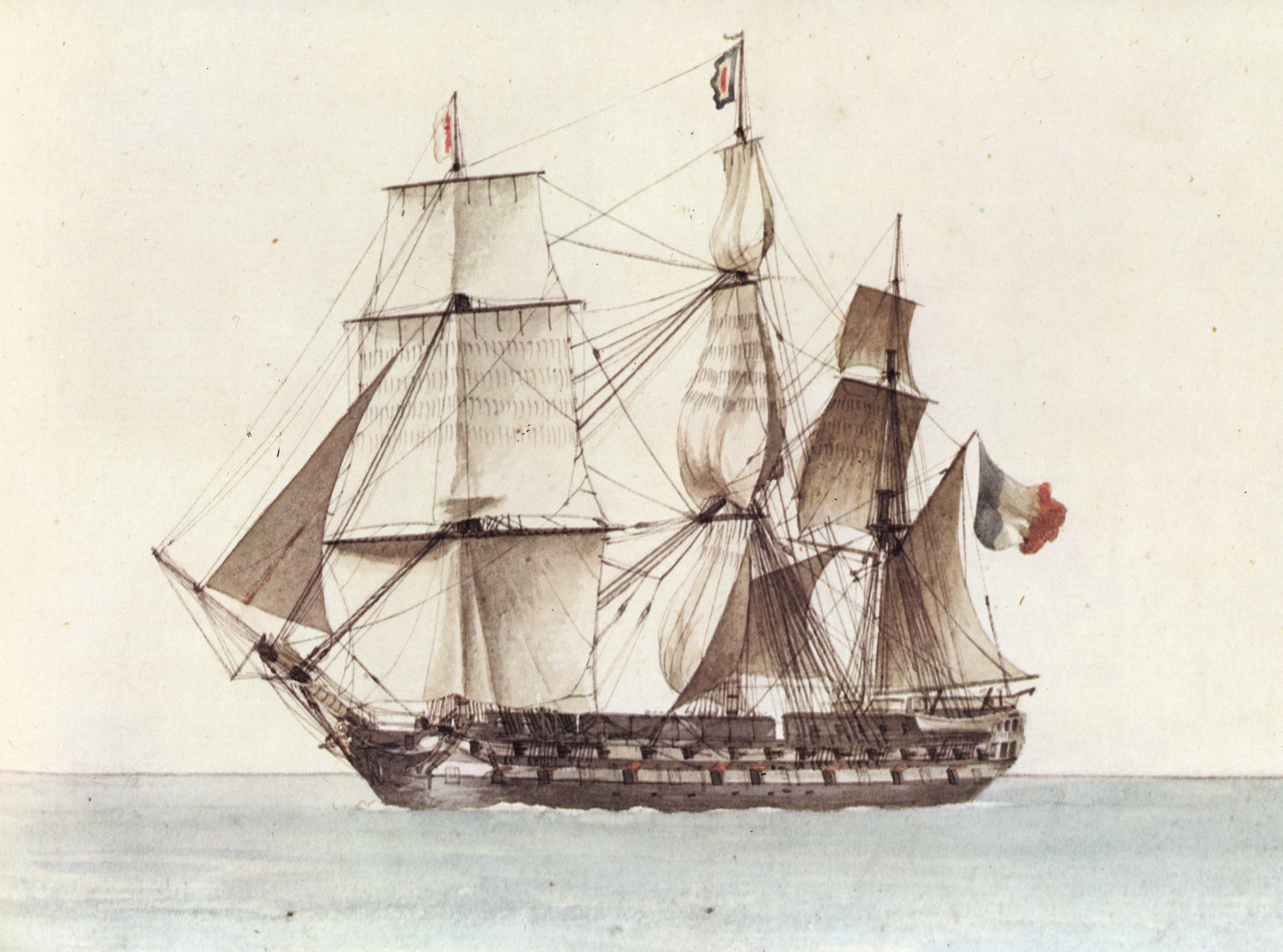
Portrait of Borée on 12 April 1807, by Antoine Roux

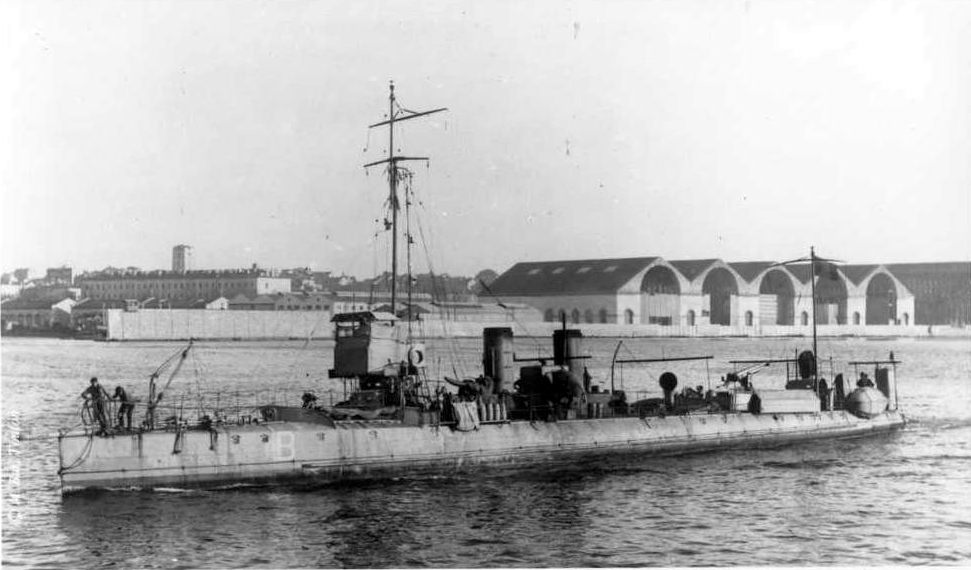
Portrait of Borée (1901) by Marius Bar

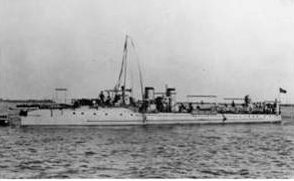
Portrait of Mistral (1901) by Marius Bar

== See also ==
- HMS Boreas

== Notes and references ==
=== Bibliography ===
- Roche, Jean-Michel (2005). Dictionnaire des bâtiments de la flotte de guerre française de Colbert à nos jours. Vol. 1. Group Retozel-Maury Millau. p. 79. ISBN 978-2-9525917-0-6. OCLC 165892922.
- Roche, Jean-Michel (2005). Dictionnaire des bâtiments de la flotte de guerre française de Colbert à nos jours. Vol. 2. Group Retozel-Maury Millau. p. 80. ISBN 978-2-9525917-0-6. OCLC 165892922.
