= Barossa =

Barossa may refer to:

== Places ==
- Barossa Valley, a valley in South Australia
  - Electoral district of Barossa
- Barossa Council, a local government area in South Australia
- Barossa Goldfields, also in the same area
- Barossa Range, mountains in South Australia
- Hundred of Barossa, a cadastral unit in South Australia
- Barrosa (Portugal), a parish of Portugal
- Playa de la Barrosa, a beach in Spain

== Ships ==
- HMS Barossa, any one of four vessels of the British Royal Navy
- SS Barossa, a cargo ship built for the Adelaide Steamship Company in 1938

== Other uses ==
- Barossa German, a German dialect spoken in the Barossa Valley
- Barossa project, a proposed natural gas field off the coast of Darwin, Northern Territory, Australia
