= HMS Bouncer =

HMS Bouncer has been the name of more than one ship of the British Royal Navy, and may refer to:

- HMS Bouncer (1797), formerly Gunboat No. 8, a 12-gun gunvessel launched in 1797 and sold in 1802.
- HMS Bouncer (1804), a 12-gun gun-brig launched in 1804, captured by the French in 1805, who renamed her Ecureuil in 1814, Bouncer again in 1815, Ecuriel again later that year, and condemned her in 1827.
- HMS Bouncer (1856), a wooden Albacore-class gunboat launched in 1856 and sold in 1871.
- HMS Bouncer (1881), a Bouncer-class flatiron gunboat launched in 1881 and sold in 1905.
- HMS Bouncer (1905), the former War Department vessel Sir Richard Fletcher, transferred to the Royal Navy in 1905, employed as a tender, and sold in 1920.
