= HMS Halstarr =

Frigate of the Royal Navy

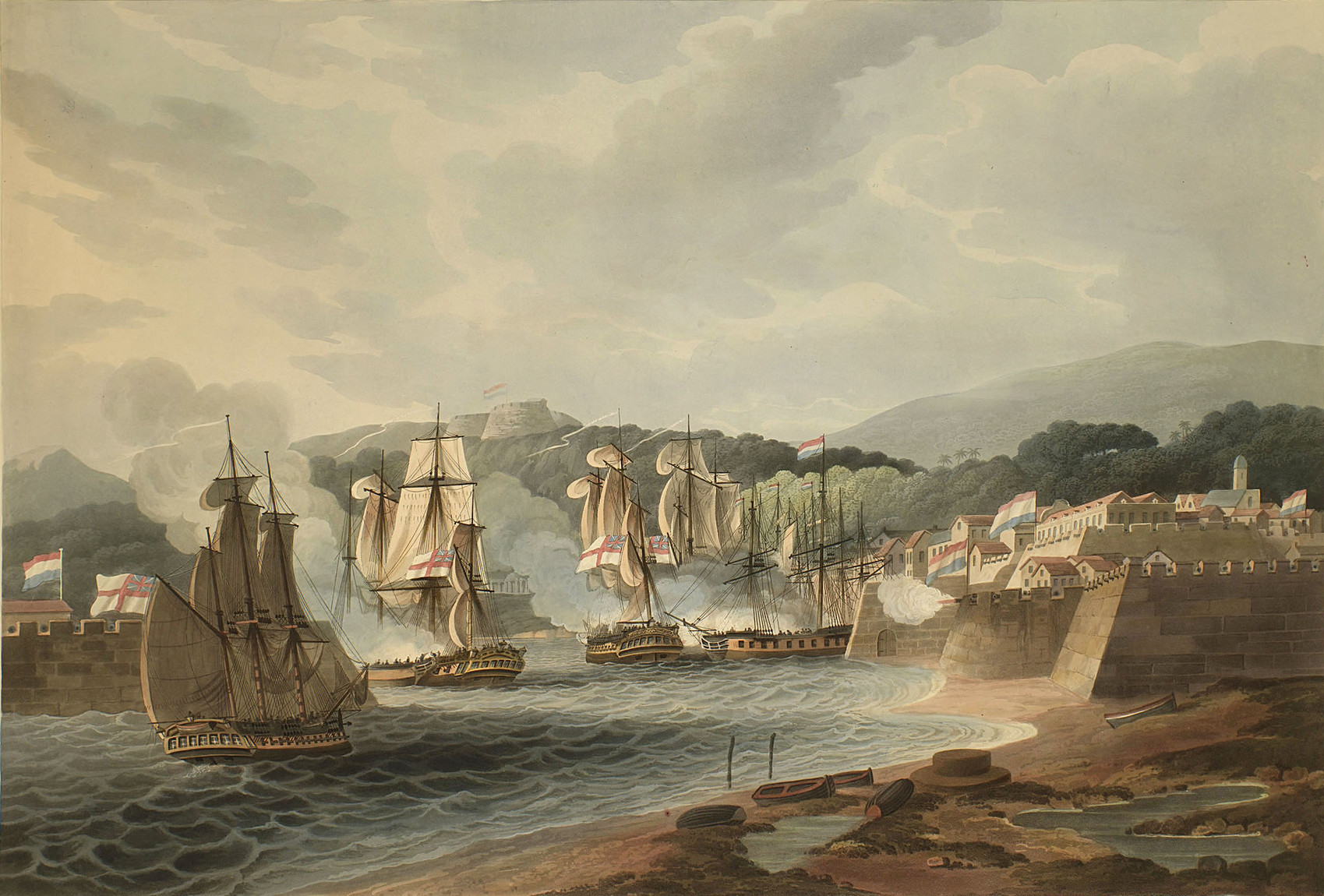
- The capture of Curaçao in 1807

History

Batavian Republic
- Name: Kenau Hasselaar
- Namesake: Kenau Simonsdochter Hasselaer: a Dutch 16th Century heroine during the Siege of Haarlem
- Builder: P. Glavimans, Rotterdam
- Launched: 1800
- Captured: 1 January 1807

United Kingdom
- Name: HMS Halstarr
- Acquired: 1 January 1807 by capture
- Fate: Broken up 1809

General characteristics
- Type: brig
- Tons burthen: 850 (bm; est.)
- Length: 145 Amsterdam feet (Note: All linear measurements are in Amsterdam feet (voet) of 11 Amsterdam inches (duim) (see Dutch units of measurement). The Amsterdam foot is about 8% shorter than an English foot. The data is from the Rotterdams jaarboekje (1900), p. 110.)
- Beam: 40 Amsterdam feet
- Depth of hold: 15 Amsterdam feet
- Propulsion: Sails
- Armament: 32 guns

Kenau Hasselaar was a 32-gun frigate of the Batavian and Dutch navies launched in 1800. She was captured by British forces at Curaçao in 1807. The Royal Navy took her into service as HMS Halstarr but the Admiralty sold her for breaking up in 1809.

== Dutch career ==
Early in 1802, Kenau Hasselaar, under the command of Captain Cornelis Hubertus Buschman, was assigned to the East Indies and Cape of Good Hope division of the Batavian Navy. After the end of the French Revolutionary Wars, the British returned the Dutch colonies they had captured in the West Indies back to the Batavian Republic. In August 1802, Buschman, still captaining Kenau Hasselaar, took a small squadron that also included the frigate Proserpina, the corvette Hippomenes, the cutter Rose, and the schooner Serpent, to take possession of Curaçao. (Note: For a map of Kenau Hasselaar's recorded positions on the voyage see: Archived 25 February 2005 at the Wayback Machine Map of recorded positions.) Kenau Hasselaar and Rose arrived at St. Anna Bay on 22 December. The other vessels in the squadron sailed to other destinations. (Note: For instance, in the summer of 1803 Hippomenes was acting as a guard ship at Fort Stabroek, Demerara when the British captured her and took her into service under her existing name. Serpent sailed to Berbice, where the British captured her in 1803 and took her into service as HMS Berbice. In 1804 the British captured Proserpine at Suriname and took her into service as HMS Amsterdam.) Shortly after Kenau Hasellar arrived at Curaçao, an outbreak of yellow fever swept through her crew that killed Buschman in February 1803, and many of his sailors.

On 24 April 1805, HMS Franchise was off Curaçao when she sighted a Batavian schooner that anchored under the guns of the fort of Port Maria. Franchise sailed in and fired on the fort and on the schooner for an hour before Franchise could cut her out. The schooner turned out to be a tender to Kenau Hasselaar, and had a crew of a lieutenant and 35 men, but a number escaped ashore, leaving behind 24 of their wounded compatriots, as well as the surgeon and the lieutenant. Franchise had one man seriously wounded and two men slightly wounded. The schooner was carrying lumber and rice.

== British service ==
On 1 January 1807 Arethusa, Latona, Anson, Fisgard, and Morne Fortunee captured Curaçao, and with it Kenau Hasselaar and the Dutch sloop Suriname. The Dutch naval forces, under the command of Commandant Cornelius J. Evertz of Kenau Hasselaar, resisted. Aboard Kenau Hasselaar five men were killed, including Evertz, and one man was wounded. In 1847 the Admiralty authorized the issue of the Naval General Service Medal with clasp "Curacoa 1 Jany. 1807" to any surviving claimants from the action; Sixty-five medals were issued. The British commissioned Kenau Hasselaar as HMS Halstarr at Jamaica under Captain John Parrish. She was broken up in 1809.
