= La Belette =

La Belette may refer to:

- a lieu-dit in Ledringhem, Nord, France
- La Belette (comic), a 1983 comic by Belgian artist Didier Comès

== See also ==
- Belette (disambiguation)
