= HMS Belette =

At least four vessels of the Royal Navy have borne the name HMS Belette. (Belette is French for "weasel".)

- HMS Belette was an 18-26-gun French Coquette-class corvette launched in 1781, that Royalists at Toulon surrendered to the British in 1793. The British burnt her and Poulette on 20 October 1796 at Ajaccio as the two vessels were too unseaworthy to evacuate the island of Corsica in the face of the advancing French troops.
- HMS Belette was the French 12-gun brig Belliqueuse, the name-ship of her class, launched in 1793 and sold in 1797 to serve as a privateer. The Royal Navy captured her in January 1798 and though the Admiralty named her HMS Belette and took her measurements, she was never commissioned; she was sold in 1801.
- HMS Belette (1806) was a Cruizer-class brig-sloop launched in 1806 and wrecked at Laeso in the Kattegat in 1812 with the loss of almost all her crew.
- HMS Belette (1814) was a Cruizer-class brig-sloop launched in 1814 but not completed until 1818. She was sold in 1828.
