= HMS Boston =

Six vessels of the Royal Navy have been named HMS Boston:

- HMS Boston (1694), a 32-gun fifth rate built in America in 1692 and presented by the citizens of Boston to the Royal Navy in 1694. The ship was captured in the Atlantic by French forces on 4 January 1695.
- HMS Boston (1748), a 24-gun sixth rate launched at Boston, Massachusetts in 1748 and broken up in 1752.
- HMS Boston (1756) was a 44-gun fifth rate launched at Portsmouth, New Hampshire in 1749 as HMS America and renamed in 1756. The ship was sold in 1757.
- HMS Boston (1762), a 32-gun fifth rate launched at Rotherhithe in May 1762 and broken up in 1811.
- HMS Boston (1764), a 6-gun schooner constructed at Navy Island in 1764 for service on the Canadian Lakes. It was burnt in 1768.
- HMS Boston (1777), a 28 gun ship captured from the Americans in 1776, refitted and given to Captain William Duddingston
- HMS Boston (J14), a turbine-powered Bangor-class minesweeper launched at Troon, Scotland in December 1940 and sold for scrap in January 1948.
