= HMS Bridlington =

HMS Bridlington has been the name of two Royal Navy vessels:

- HMS Bridlington was a Hunt-class minesweeper laid down under this name but renamed HMS Goole before her launch in 1919. In 1926 she was completed and renamed HMS Irwell. She was scrapped in 1962.
- HMS Bridlington (J65) was a Bangor-class minesweeper launched in 1940 and transferred to the Air Ministry with the same name in 1946. She was scrapped in 1960.
