= HMS Berbice (1804) =

History

Batavian Republic
- Name: Serpent (Note: This may have been the gunboat Slang (snake in Dutch), of four guns and 25 men, that the department Amsterdam had bought 1799 and sold in 1801.)
- Captured: 1803

United Kingdom
- Name: HMS Berbice
- Acquired: 1803 by capture
- Fate: Foundered 24 May 1806

General characteristics
- Tons burthen: 78 (bm)
- Propulsion: Sails
- Sail plan: Schooner
- Armament: 4 or 6 guns

HMS Berbice was the Batavian Republic's schooner Serpent that HMS Heureux took possession of at Berbice in 1803 at the capitulation of the colony and that the Navy purchased in 1804. Berbice foundered in 1806 off Demerara.

== Career ==
Early in 1802, Kenau Hasselar, under the command of Captain Cornelius (or Cornelis) Hubertus Buschman, was assigned to the East Indies and Cape of Good Hope division of the Navy. After the end of the French Revolutionary Wars, the British ceded the Dutch colonies they had captured in the West Indies to the Batavian Republic. In August 1802, Buschman and Kenau Hasselar took a small squadron that also included the frigate Proserpina, the corvette Hippomenes, the cutter Rose, and the schooner Serpent, to take possession of Curaçao.

Around 8 May 1803 Serpent fired on Dutch mutineers that wanted to turn the colony of Berbice over to the British. The mutiny failed, though Serpent's contribution to this result appears minimal.

On 23 September 1803 Heureux represented the Royal Navy at the capture of the Batavian Republic's colony at Berbice. The British captured the schooner Serpent, as well many arms, troops and the like. The Navy took Serpent into service as HMS Berbice and Admiral Sir Samuel Hood appointed Acting-Lieutenant James Glassford Gooding as her commander. The Navy registered and commissioned her in 1805 in the Leeward Islands. Gooding was confirmed in his rank on 20 November.

In October 1804 Berbice was at Paramaraibo where she served as a guardship. At the time her crew was suffering from yellow fever, with many having died.

Berbice foundered on 24 May 1806 off Demerara. All her crew were saved.

A week later, the merchants and planters of Demerara voted a sword valued at 100 guineas to Lieutenant Gooding in thanks for his services in protecting the coasting trade as commander of Berbice.
