= HMS Banshee =

Two ships of the Royal Navy were named Banshee.

- HMS Banshee (1847), a packet boat in service 1847–1864
- HMS Banshee (1894), a destroyer in service 1894–1912
