= HMS Berbice (1780) =

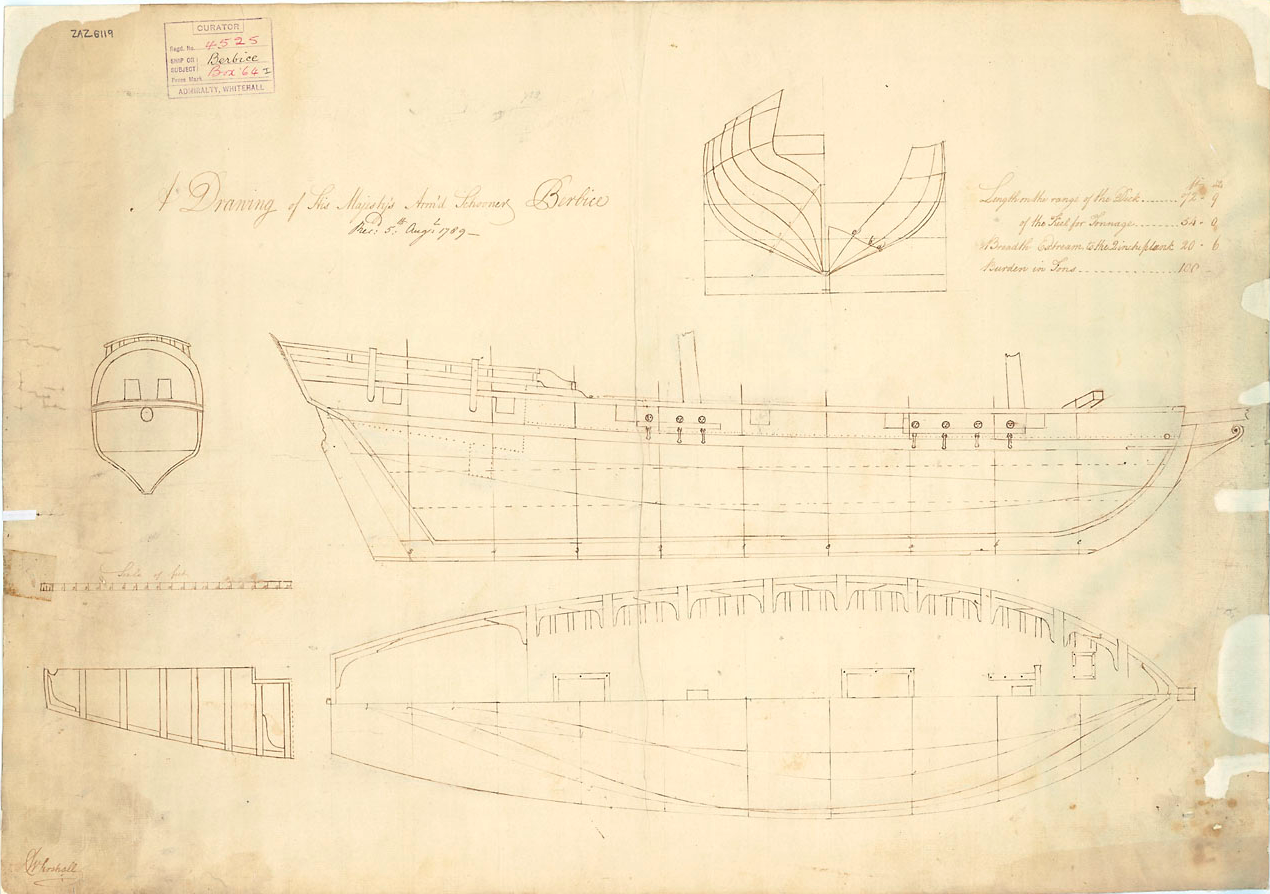
- Ship's lines plans taken after Berbice's purchase by the Royal Navy

History

Great Britain
- Name: HMS Berbice
- Acquired: 1780 by purchase
- Fate: Condemned 1788

General characteristics
- Tons burthen: 12066/94(bm)
- Length: 72 ft 9 in (22.2 m) (overall); 54 ft 0 in (16.5 m) (keel)
- Beam: 20 ft 6 in (6.2 m)
- Depth of hold: 6 ft 0 in (1.8 m) (overall)
- Propulsion: Sails
- Sail plan: Schooner
- Complement: 42
- Armament: 6 × 3-pounder guns + 2 × 12-pounder carronades + 8 × ½-pounder swivel guns + 6 musketoons

HMS Berbice was a schooner, initially built for use as a merchant ship, that the Royal Navy purchased in the West Indies in 1780. Her most prominent service was as a naval tender to HMS Adamant, the flagship of Sir Richard Hughes in the Leeward Islands Station. She was formerly commissioned in July 1781, and from 1782 to 1783 she was commanded by Lieutenant Thomas Boulden Thompson. On 23 February 1782, naval records indicate that she was at English Harbour, in need of crewmen but otherwise ready for active duty.

Between 1784 and the autumn of 1786, when he returned to England as an officer of Adamant, Berbice's commander was Lieutenant James Bremer. Berbice was condemned at Antigua on 12 September 1788 and broken up.

The Royal Navy later lent her name to HMS Berbice.

The National Maritime Museum, Greenwich has a one-page drawing labeled "A DRAWING OF HIS MAJESTY'S ARM'D SCHOONER BERBICE, THE 5TH AUG 1789" that comprises a sheer plan, body lines, deck plan, lines, and a view of her stern. These drawings represent the earliest draught of what became known as the Baltimore Clipper.
