= HMS Baltimore =

Two ships of the Royal Navy have been named HMS Baltimore:

- HMS Baltimore (1695) was a 28-gun fifth rate launched in 1695
- HMS Baltimore (1742) was a sloop of war launched in 1742 converted to a bomb vessel in 1758 and sold in 1762
