= HMS Blazer =

Seven ships of the Royal Navy have borne the name HMS Blazer. George Spencer - First Lord of the Admiralty, named the first Blazer after a dog in his foxhound pack; thereafter, the Royal Navy re-used the name.

- HMS Blazer (1797) was a 12-gun gunboat launched in 1797 that the Swedes took possession of in 1801 but restored to Britain in 1802. She was sold in 1803.
- HMS Blazer (1804) was a 12-gun gun-brig launched in 1804 and sold in 1814.
- HMS Blazer (1834) was a wooden paddle sloop launched in 1834, converted to a survey vessel in 1843, and broken up in 1853.
- HMS Blazer (1855) was a mortar vessel launched in 1855, renamed MV3 later that year, and transferred to the Thames Conservancy Board in 1867.
- HMS Blazer (1856) was an Albacore-class wooden screw gunboat launched in 1856, converted to a dredger and renamed YC29 in 1868, and sold in 1877.
- HMS Blazer (1870) was an Ant-class gunboat launched in 1870, used as a tender from 1904, but reverting to a gunboat in 1914. She was sold in 1919.
- HMS Blazer (P279) is an Archer-class patrol vessel launched in 1985 and in service as of 2012.

== See also ==
- HMS Blaze
