= HMS Barbadoes =

A number of ships of the Royal Navy were named Barbadoes or Barbados, after the island of Barbados.

- HMS Barbadoes (1757), a 14-gun sloop in service 1757–63
- HMS Barbadoes (1778), a 14-gun brig-sloop in service 1778–80
- HMS Barbadoes (1782), a 14-gun sloop in service 1782–84
- HMS Barbadoes (1804), a fifth-rate frigate, formerly the French privateer Braave
- HMS Barbadoes (1813) was a 16-gun vessel, the American Herald, captured in 1813. She was paid-off in May 1816 and became a powder ship in Jamaica that was later wrecked with her remains being sold.
- HMS Barbados (K504), a Colony-class frigate
