= HMS Busy =

Two vessels of the Royal Navy have been named HMS Busy:

- HMS Busy (1778) was a 10-gun cutter purchased on the stocks by the Royal Navy in 1778. She was sold in 1792.
- HMS Busy (1797) was an 18-gun brig-sloop launched in 1797. She foundered while serving on the North America Station in 1807.
