= HMS Blandford =

Three vessels of the Royal Navy have been named HMS Blandford after Blandford Forum:

- HMS Blandford (1711) was a 20-gun Gibraltar Group frigate launched in 1711. She foundered in the Bay of Biscay in 1719.
- HMS Blandford (1720) was a 20-gun 1719 Establishment frigate launched in 1720. Sold in 1742, she entered into the transatlantic slave trade.
- HMS Blandford (1741) was a 24-gun modified 1733 Establishment frigate launched in 1741. In 1755 she was seized by the French off Brest in retaliation for the seizure of French ships in Canada but later released. She was sold in 1763.
