= HMS Blyth =

Two ships of the Royal Navy have been named HMS Blyth:

- HMS Blyth (J15) - a Bangor-class minesweeper launched on 2 September 1940, placed in reserve in 1946 and sold in 1948. She was renamed Radbourne and served as a ferry until being broken up in November 1952.
- HMS Blyth (M111) - is the eleventh Sandown-class minehunter, launched in 2000 and decommissioned from British Royal Navy in 2021. She was later sold to Romanian Naval Forces, entering Romanian service in 2023 as Sublocotenent Ion Ghiculescu.

== Battle honours ==
Ships named Blyth have earned the following battle honours:

- Dieppe 1942
- North Sea 1942
- English Channel 1943
- Normandy 1944
- Al Faw 2003
