= Black Pool =

Hot spring in Yellowstone park, United States

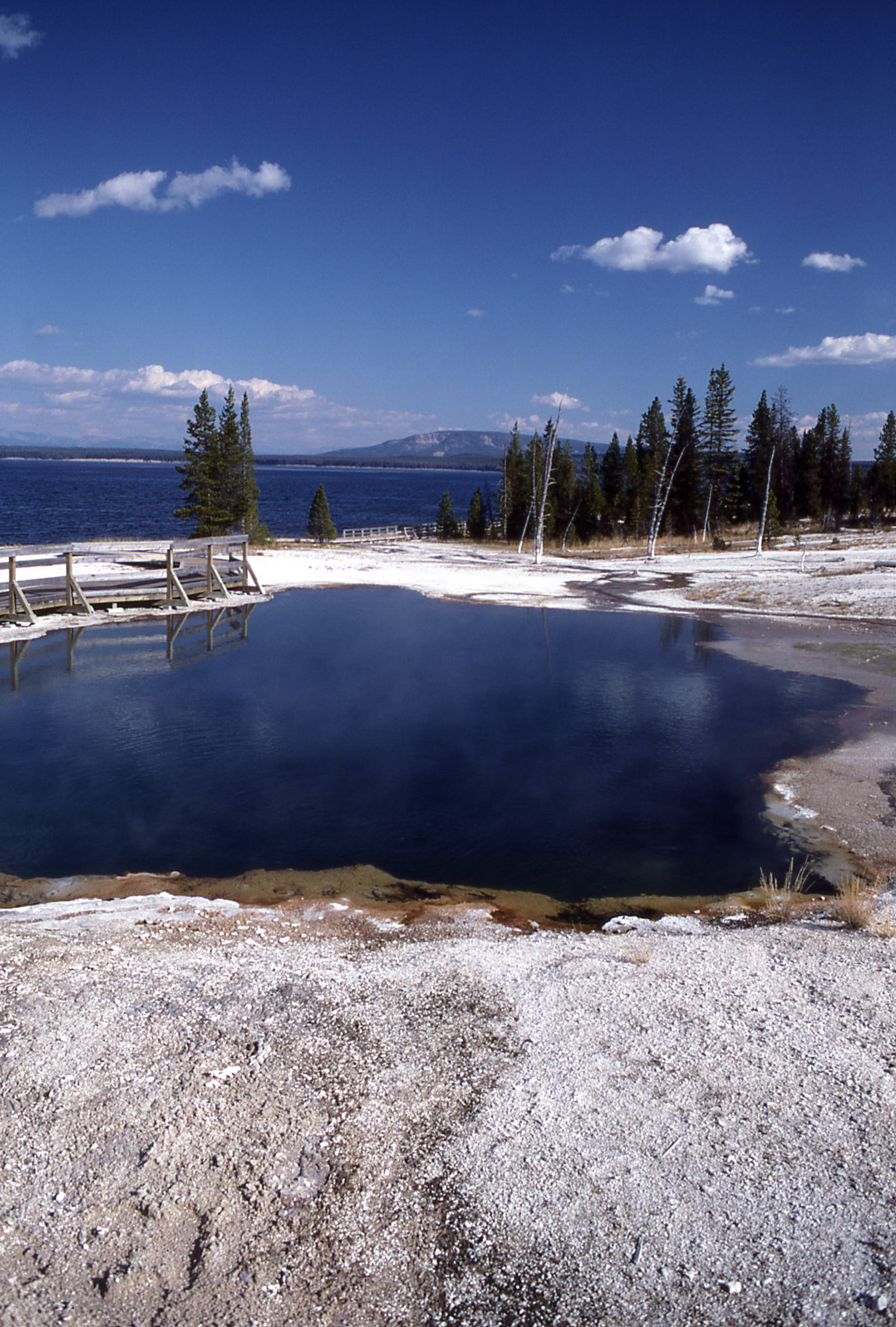
- Black Pool prior to the 1991 thermophile die-off

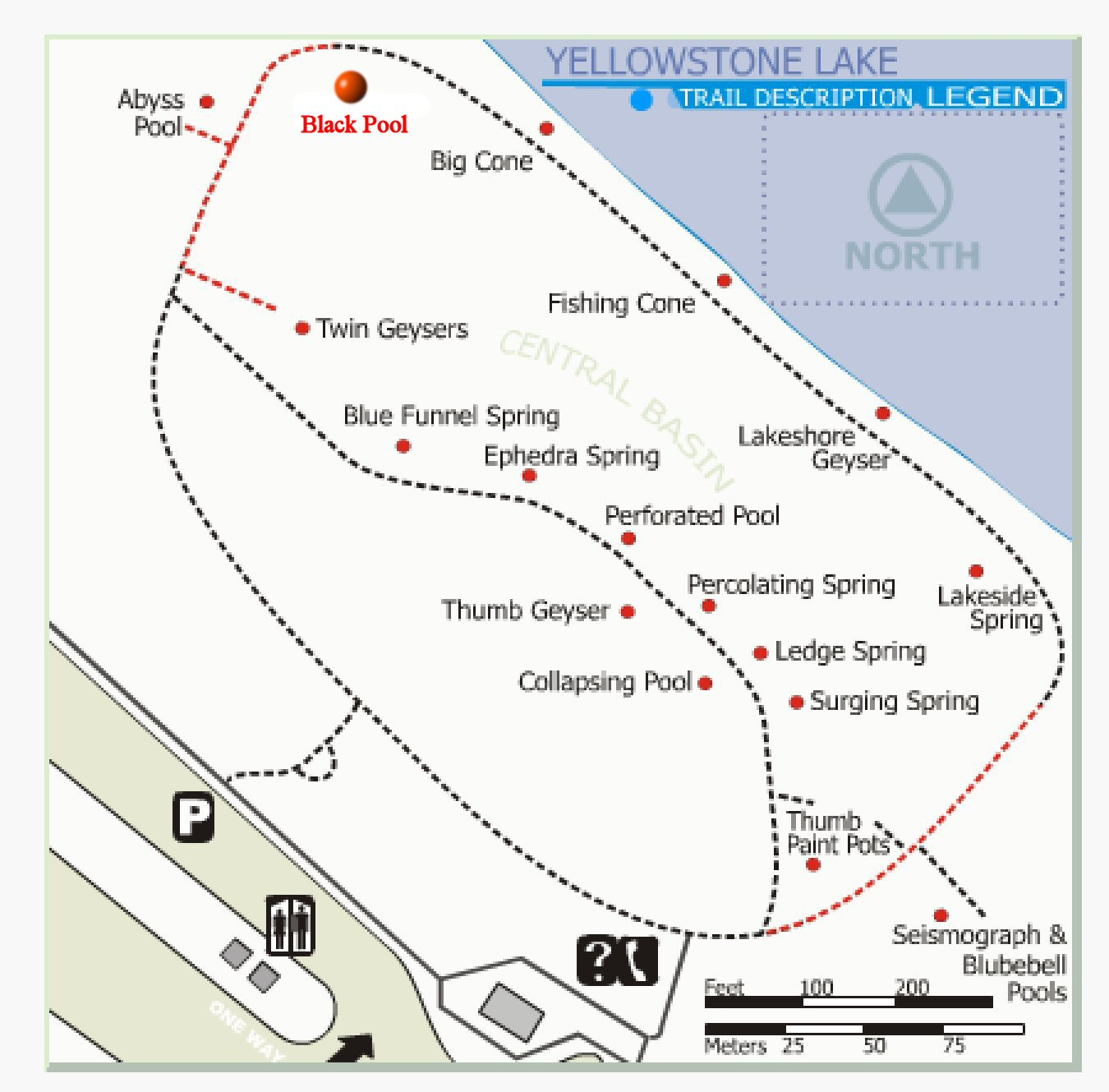
- West Thumb Geyser Basin
- Location: West Thumb Geyser Basin, Yellowstone National Park, Teton County, Wyoming
- Coordinates: 44°25′05″N 110°34′19″W
- Elevation: 7,756 feet (2,364 m)
- Type: Hot Spring
- Temperature: 72.9 °C (163.2 °F)

Black Pool is a hot spring in the West Thumb Geyser Basin of Yellowstone National Park in the United States.

The pool was cool enough up until 1991 for dark orange-brown cyanobacteria to grow throughout the pool. When combined with the blue of the water, the pool appeared to be an exceptionally dark green to almost black, hence the name.

An exchange of function took place in 1991, shifting thermal energy to Black Pool and nearby Abyss Pool, causing them to heat up. Black Pool's temperature became hot enough to kill all the cyanobacteria in the pool, turning the pool a rich teal blue color. The pool also had frequent boiling eruptions on August 15, 1991, doming the water to 3 feet and causing heavy runoff. Black Pool remains extremely hot, and is now one of Yellowstone's most vibrant blue pools. The name of the pool remains "Black Pool."

Images of Black Pool
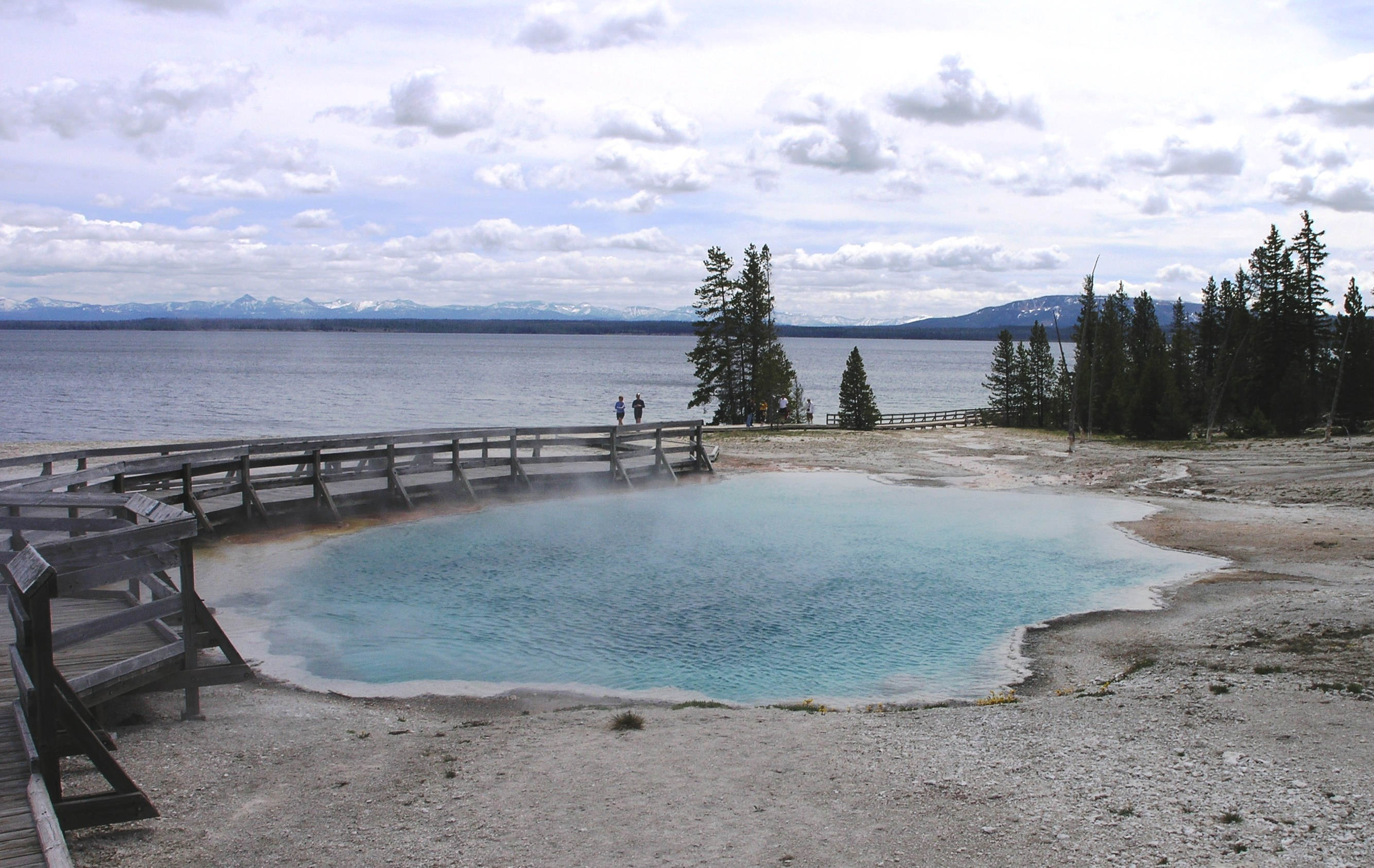
Black Pool, 2006

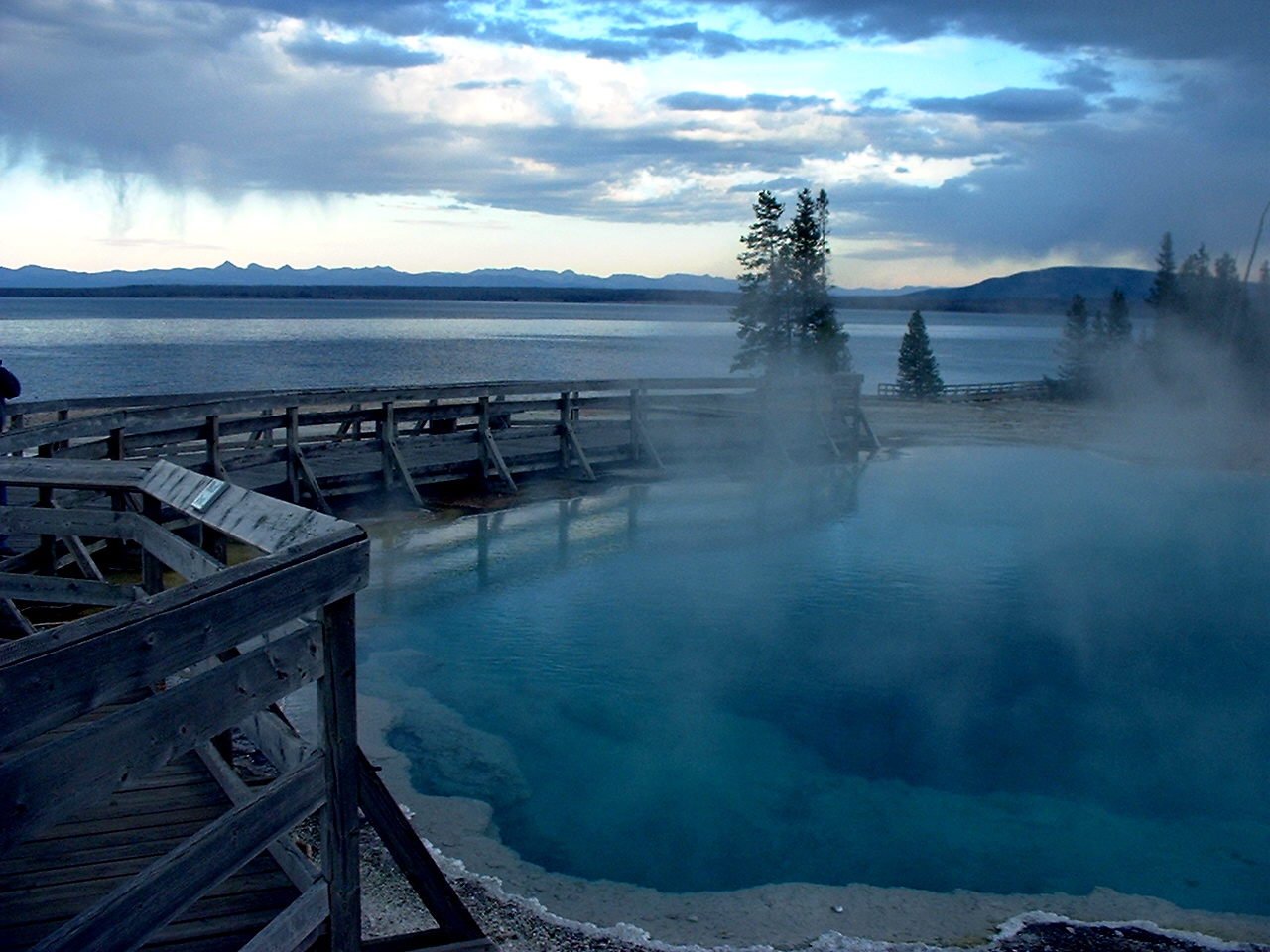
Black Pool, 2003

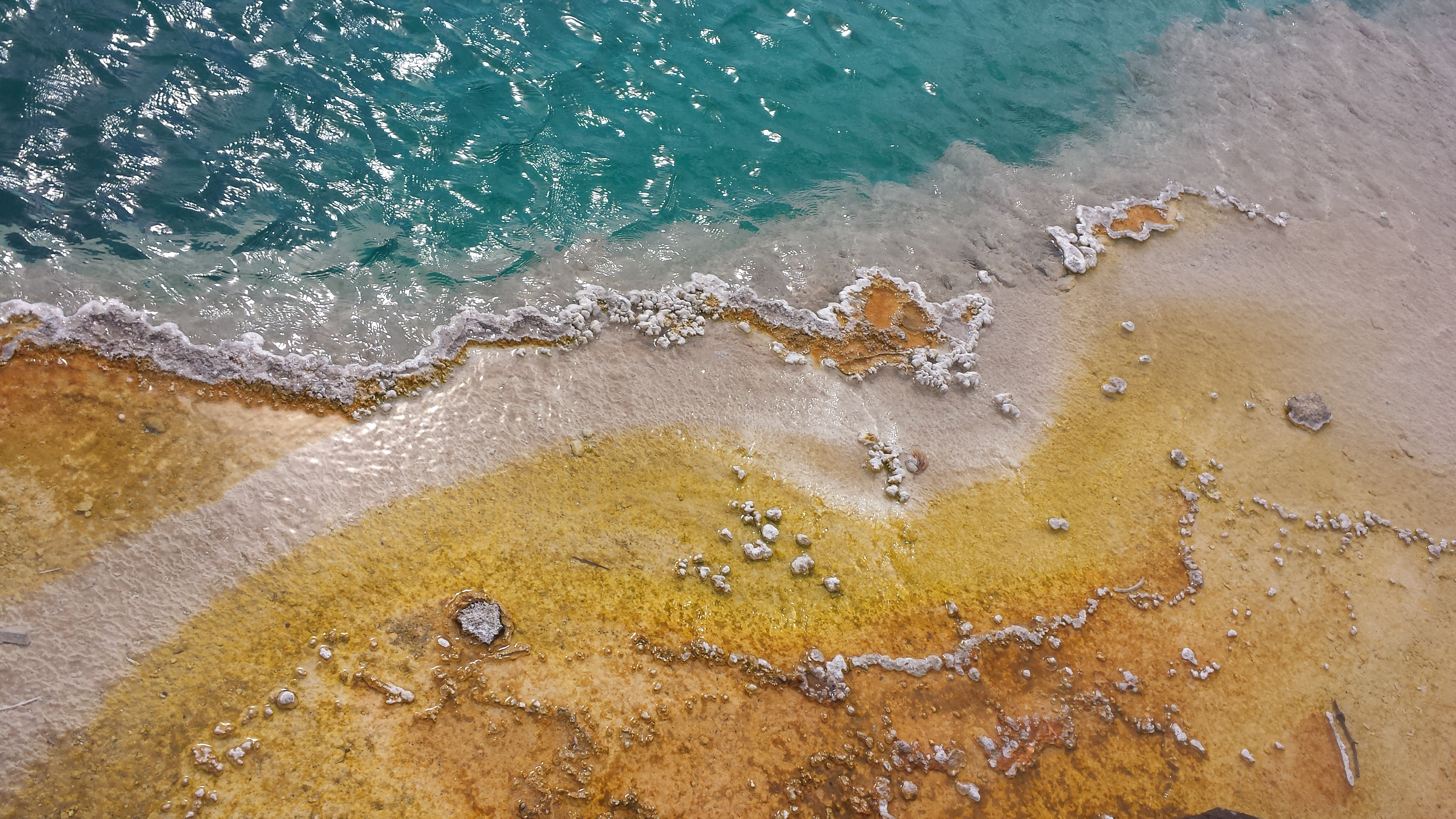
Black Pool, 2013
