= HMS Begum =

One ship of the Royal Navy has borne the name HMS Begum, whilst another was planned:

- HMS Begum was to have been an escort carrier. She was however retained by the US Navy as the Casablanca-class escort carrier USS Natoma Bay.
- HMS Begum (D38) was a Ruler-class escort carrier, previously USS Bolinas. She was launched in 1942, returned to the US Navy in 1946 and sold in 1947.
