= HMS Blackburn =

HMS Blackburn has been the name of two Royal Navy vessels:

- HMS Blackburn (1918), a Hunt-class minesweeper launched 1918, sold 1922.
- HMS Blackburn (1944), lead ship of the Blackburn-class aircraft transports, an aircraft transport launched 25 March 1944. She became a RNVR drillship in 1950, and was sold in 1968 to become RV Gardline Locater (Gardline Shipping). Broken up 1997.
