= French brig Belliqueuse (1793) =

Belliqueuse
History

France
- Name: Belliquese
- Ordered: 15 April 1793
- Builder: Michel Colin-Olivier, Dieppe
- Laid down: May 1793
- Launched: 30 December 1793
- Captured: January 1798

Great Britain
- Name: HMS Belette
- Acquired: 16 January 1798 by capture
- Fate: Sold 1801

General characteristics
- Class & type: Belliqueuse-class brig
- Displacement: 475 tons (French)
- Tons burthen: 220-280 (French; "of load"); 346 49/94 (bm)
- Length: 104 ft 4 1/2 in (31.8 m) (overall); 85 ft 7 1/2 in (26.1 m) (keel)
- Beam: 27 ft 7 in (8.4 m)
- Depth of hold: 7 ft 5 in (2.3 m)
- Sail plan: Brig
- Complement: French Navy:6 officers + 110-140 other ranks; Privateer:120; British service:125
- Armament: French Navy; Originally: 12 × 12-pounder guns; 1794: 6 × 24-pounder + 2 × 8-pounder guns; Privateer: 14 × 8-pounder guns + four carronades; British service: 20 × 24-pounder carronades

Belliquese was a French Navy 12-gun brig launched in 1793 as the name-vessel of her class, and sold in 1797 to serve as a privateer. The British Royal Navy captured her in 1798. Though the Royal Navy named her HMS Bellete and took her measurements, it never actually commissioned her; she was sold in 1801.

== French Navy ==
The Belliqueuse-class of brig-corvettes were built to a design by Pierre-Alexander-Laurent Forfait. The class was ill-fated. All five fell into British hands.

Between 23 May 1794 and 24 December, Belliqueuse was under the command of lieutenant de vaisseau Louvel (fils). She was at Le Havre, Ostend, and Dunkirk. From there she sailed to Cherbourg.

Between 25 March 1795 and 6 June, Louvel escorted convoys between Saint-Malo and Brest roads. He also cruised with her in the Bay of Cancale.

In January 1797 the French Navy stationed her at Saint-Malo. It then sold Belliqueuse in November to private interests for use as a privateer.

== Capture ==
On 16 January 1798 Melampus was in company with Seahorse when they captured Belliqueux, off the Irish coast. She was out of Saint-Malo, and on 11 January had captured His Majesty's packet Prince Ernest, which had been sailing from Tortola. The captain of the packet and all but four of her crew were on board Belliqueux.

== Fate ==
She arrived at Plymouth on 22 January 1798 and immediately went into ordinary under the name HMS Belette (or Billette). The "Principal officers and commissioners of His Majesty's Navy" offered Billette, of 346 tons, for sale on 31 August 1801. She was sold for £1,500.
