= HMS Berbice (1793) =

History

France
- Name: Berbice
- Namesake: Berbice
- Captured: 1793

Great Britain
- Name: HMS Berbice
- Acquired: 1793 by capture
- Fate: Foundered October 1796

General characteristics
- Tons burthen: 12066/94(bm)
- Length: 72 ft 9 in (22.2 m) (overall); 54 ft 0 in (16.5 m) (keel)
- Beam: 20 ft 6 in (6.2 m)
- Depth of hold: 6 ft 0 in (1.8 m) (overall)
- Propulsion: Sails
- Sail plan: Schooner
- Complement: 55
- Armament: 8 × 12-pounder carronades + 2 × 6-pounder chase guns
- Notes: Berbice may have been the earlier HMS Berbice.

HMS Berbice was the French privateer Berbice that the British Royal Navy captured in 1793 and took into service under her existing name. She ran aground three years later.

== Career ==
Berbice was a French privateer schooner of eight guns that the Royal Navy captured early in 1793.

The Navy commissioned her for the Leeward Islands station in October 1793 under Lieutenant Thomas Oliver. However, she was already serving the Royal Navy in April 1793. Berbice, under Oliver's command, captured the French merchant sloops St Phillipe and Utile.

There is some ambiguity about which officers commanded her and when. At one point Midshipman John Ferris Devonshire (eventually Admiral Sir John Devonshire), took command on the death of Berbice's commander. Devonshire then patrolled the coasts of Puerto Rico where he, with the Spaniards, suppressed the French privateers that not only impeded the island's commerce, but also materially obstructed the resupply of the British army in Martinique. During a slave uprising at Saint Lucia, Devonshire successfully conveyed Lieutenant-General William Myers to the island during the hurricane season.

Apparently, Lieutenant John Richards Lapenotiere commanded her too, though Oliver paid her off later. Lieutenant John Pasco (or Pascoe) recommissioned her in December 1795, again for the Leeward Islands. Berbice was one of the many vessels that shared in the proceeds of the surrender of the island of Saint Lucia on 25 May 1796 by the British forces under the command of Admiral Hugh Cloberry Christian and Lieutenant-General Sir Ralph Abercromby.

== Loss ==
Berbice was under the command of Lieutenant John Trehaser (or Tresaher) when she wrecked on Scotsman's Head (15.416667°N 61.333333°W), Dominica, on 26 October 1796. She had been cruising in company with Lacedemonian when they separated in the dark and rain. Berbice continued on Lacedemonian's last known course and proceeded to wreck. There were 42 men aboard Berbice; none were lost.
