= HMS Ballahou =

Two vessels of the Royal Navy have borne the name HMS Ballahou, or Ballahoo:

- Ballahou was a gun-boat first listed in 1800. She appears in the records as serving in the navy's Egyptian campaign (8 March to 2 September 1801). Her officers and crew therefore qualified for the clasp "Egypt" to the Naval General Service Medal that the Admiralty issued in 1847 to all surviving claimants.
- HMS Ballahoo (1804) was a 4-gun Ballahoo-class schooner launched in 1804 that an American privateer captured in 1814.
