= HMS Bristol =

Seven ships of the Royal Navy have borne the name HMS Bristol, after the English port city of Bristol:

- English ship Bristol (1653) was a 48-gun ship launched in 1653, completely rebuilt in 1693, captured by the French in April 1709, recaptured two weeks later and sunk.
- HMS Bristol (1711) was a 54-gun fourth rate launched in 1711. She underwent a rebuild in 1746 which rearmed her with 50 guns, and was broken up in 1768.
- HMS Bristol (1775) was a 50-gun fourth rate launched in 1775. She served in the American War of Independence, was used as a prison ship after 1794, and was broken up in 1810.
- Bristol was originally the 64-gun third rate HMS Agincourt. She was renamed HMS Bristol when she became a prison ship in 1812. She was sold in 1814 for immediate breaking up.
- HMS Bristol (1861) was a wooden screw frigate launched in 1861 and broken up in 1883.
- HMS Bristol (1910) was a Town-class light cruiser launched in 1910. She was the name ship of the Bristol subgroup and was sold in 1921.
- HMS Bristol (1939) was a training establishment ('stone frigate') set up in House 4 of Muller's Orphanage in Bristol.
- HMS Bristol (D23) was a unique Type 82 destroyer launched in 1973, later and moored at HMS Excellent, Portsmouth as a training ship, finally decommissioned in October 2020 after 47 years in the RN.

== Battle honours ==
- Santa Cruz 1657
- Battle of Lowestoft 1665
- Four Days' Battle 1666
- Orfordness 1666
- Sole Bay 1672
- Battle of Texel 1673
- Finisterre 1747
- Falkland Islands 1914
- Falkland Islands 1982
