= HMS Barbette =

Three vessels of the Royal Navy have been named HMS Barbette for the barbette

- HMS Barbette was the French privateer Vaillant, launched in 1801 that the Royal Navy captured in 1805. She was renamed but never commissioned and was broken up in 1811.
- HMS Barbette (1937) was a Bar-class boom defence vessel launched on 15 December 1937, that prior to 1939 served with the Royal Navy's Eastern Fleet, and was sold to the Turkish Navy on 3 March 1941.
- HMS Barbette (Z242) was a Bar-class boom defense vessel launched on 18 June 1943 and broken up in Belgium in 1965

== See also ==
- HMAS Barbette was an Attack-class patrol boat of the Royal Australian Navy (RAN), launched on 10 April 1968 and sold to the Indonesian Navy on 22 February 1986
