= HMS Bold =

Four vessels of the Royal Navy have borne the name HMS Bold.

- HMS Bold (1801), an Archer-class gun-brig of 14 guns built by Perry & Wells, at Blackwall Yard in 1801. She ran aground near Yarmouth, Isle of Wight in a gale on 6 January 1811 and was broken up in April.
- HMS Bold (1812), a 12-gun Bold-class gun-brig built at Bursledon in 1812. On the morning of 27 September 1813 a strong current drove her on shore near the north end of Prince Edward Island and she was wrecked, but the crew was saved.
- HMS Bold, the ex-HMS Manly, which had just been recaptured from the Danes. A new HMS Manly having just been commissioned, and a HMS Bold just having been lost, the Admiralty recycled the name. She was sold on 11 August 1814.
- HMS Bold (W114), a tugboat built for the U.S. Navy as Bold (BAT-8) along the lines of American ATRs; was transferred to the United Kingdom on 29 June 1942; returned to the U.S. Navy in January 1946 at Subic Bay; sold 1948.

== Sources ==
- Colledge, J. J.; Warlow, Ben (2006) [1969]. Ships of the Royal Navy: The Complete Record of All Fighting Ships of the Royal Navy from the 15th Century to the Present (3rd Rev ed.). London: Chatham Publishing. ISBN 978-1-86176-281-8. OCLC 67375475.
- Winfield, Rif (2008). British Warships in the Age of Sail 1793–1817: Design, Construction, Careers and Fates. Seaforth Publishing. ISBN 978-1-86176-246-7.
