= HMS Badminton =

Two Royal Navy vessels have been named HMS Badminton, after Badminton, Gloucestershire:

- HMS Badminton (1918), a Hunt-class minesweeper launched May 1918; sold 1928
- HMS Badminton (M1149), a Ton-class minesweeper launched 1954; broken up in 1970
