= HMS Boscawen =

Two ships and a shore establishment of the Royal Navy have borne the name HMS Boscawen, after Admiral Edward Boscawen, whilst another ship was planned:

- HMS Boscawen (1763) was a 4-gun cutter purchased in 1763 and sold in 1773.
- HMS Boscawen was to have been an 80-gun second rate ship of the line. She was laid down in 1811 but subsequently cancelled.
- HMS Boscawen (1844) was a 70-gun third rate launched in 1844. She was converted into a training ship in 1862. In 1874 she was renamed Wellesley; she was damaged by fire in 1914 and was subsequently broken up.
- HMS Boscawen (training establishment) was a boys' training establishment at Portland, in service from 1867 to 1906. A number of ships were renamed HMS Boscawen (after HMS Boscawen (1844)) whilst stationed there:
  - HMS Trafalgar (1841) was HMS Boscawen from 1873 to 1906.
  - HMS Minotaur (1863) was HMS Boscawen II from 1893 to 1904, and HMS Boscawen from 1904 to 1905.
  - HMS Agincourt (1865) was HMS Boscawen III from 1905 to 1906.
- HMS Boscawen (shore establishment) was the designation of Portland naval base from 1 July 1932 to 31 December 1947.
