= HMS Blackfly =

At least two ships of the Royal Navy have borne the name HMS Blackfly:

- HM Gunboat Blackfly, a Fly-class gunboat built in 1916. She sank after colliding with a bridge in Baghdad on 16 May 1923 while loaned to the Air Ministry.
- HMS Blackfly (FY 117), an anti-submarine trawler, requisitioned in 1939. She was sold in July 1946.
