= HMS Belliqueux =

Two ships of the Royal Navy have borne the name HMS Belliqueux:

- HMS Belliqueux (1758) was a 64-gun third rate, captured from the French in 1758 and broken up in 1772.
- HMS Belliqueux (1780) was a 64-gun third rate launched in 1780, used as a prison ship from 1814 and broken up in 1816.
