= HMS Belle Poule =

Two ships of the Royal Navy have borne the name HMS Belle Poule, from the French meaning Beautiful Chicken:

- HMS Belle Poule (1780) was a 36-gun fifth rate captured from the French in 1780 and sold in 1801.
- HMS Belle Poule (1806) was a 38-gun fifth rate captured from the French in 1806. She was used as a troopship from 1814, a prison ship from 1815, and was sold in 1816.

== See also ==
- French ship Belle Poule
