= HMS Braak =

Two ships of the Royal Navy have borne the name HMS Braak, the Dutch word for "break-through" (braak) or beagle (brak):

- HMS Braak (1795) was an 18-gun brig-sloop seized from the Dutch in 1795 and lost when she capsized in 1798.
- HMS Braak was a 24-gun sixth rate, formerly the Dutch Minerva. She was captured in 1799 and sold at Deptford in 1802. She then became the whaler African, making two voyages for Daniel Bennett.
