= HMS Begonia =

Two vessels of the Royal Navy have been named HMS Begonia after the flower.

- HMS Begonia (1915) was an Azalea-class sloop launched in 1915, converted to a Q-ship and sunk in a collision with a German submarine off Casablanca in 1917.
- HMS Begonia (K66) was a Flower-class corvette launched in 1940 and lent to the United States Navy between 1942 and 1945, where she served as USS Impulse. The ship was sold into civilian service in 1946.
