= HMS Bouncer (1804) =

Brig of the Royal Navy

History

United Kingdom
- Name: HMS Bouncer
- Ordered: 9 January 1804
- Builder: William Rowe, St Peter's Yard, Newcastle upon Tyne
- Laid down: April 1804
- Launched: 11 August 1804
- Commissioned: November 1804
- Captured: Captured February 1805

France
- Name: Bouncer
- Acquired: 21 February 1805 by purchase of a prize
- Renamed: Ecuriel (24 September 1814); Bouncer (22 March 1815); Ecuriel (15 July 1815)
- Fate: Condemned 28 June 1827

General characteristics
- Tons burthen: 1771/94, or 177 (bm)
- Sail plan: Brig
- Complement: 50
- Armament: 10 × 18-pounder carronades + 2 × 12-pounder chase guns

HMS Bouncer was launched at Newcastle upon Tyne in 1804 for the British Royal Navy. The French captured her in February 1805. She went through several name changes before she was condemned in 1827.

== Royal Navy service ==
Lieutenant Samuel Bassan commissioned Bouncer in November 1804.

In February 1805 Bouncer ran aground on a sandbank on the French coast between Boulogne and Dieppe. The pounding of the se caused her to leak uncontrollably. The French captured her and her crew.

== French Navy service ==
The French Navy purchased Bouncer on 21 February 1805, and commissioned her under her existing name.

On 10 November 1811, and also on 29 September 1812, Bouncer was at Boulogne-ur-Mer and under the command of Lieutenant de vaisseau de La Rouvraye.

== Fate ==
Ecuriel (ex-Bouncer) was condemned on 28 June 1827.
