= HMS Bustard =

Four vessels of the British Royal Navy have been named HMS Bustard after the Bustard:

- HMS Bustard (1806) was launched in 1803 as the brig Royal George for the Revenue Service. The Royal Navy purchased her in 1806 and renamed her HMS Bustard. She served on active duty between 1808 and 1815, distinguishing herself in operations in the Mediterranean. The Royal Navy sold her in 1815 and she became the whaler Royal George. She made three whaling voyages and was lost in 1825 on her fourth.
- HMS Bustard (1818) was a Cherokee-class brig-sloop; she was sold in 1829.
- HMS Bustard (1855) was an Albacore-class wood screw gunboat; she was sold at Hong Kong in 1869.
- HMS Bustard (1871) was an Ant-class iron screw gunboat; listed until 1921 but possibly sold in November 1917.
