= HMS Bruiser =

Several ships of the British Royal Navy have been named HMS Bruiser or HMS Bruizer.

- HMS Bruiser (1797) was an Acute-class gun-brig launched in 1797 and sold in 1802.
- HMS Bruiser (1804) was an Archer-class gun-brig launched in 1804. She was sold in 1815.
- HMS Bruiser (1854) was the former Robert Stephenson, an iron steam-powered ship purchased on the stocks and launched in 1854. She was renamed Bruiser in June 1855, employed as a floating flour mill during the Crimean War and sold in 1857.
- HMS Bruiser (1867) was a Britomart-class gunboat launched in 1867 and broken up at Devonport in 1886.
- HMS Bruiser (1895) was an Ardent-class destroyer launched in 1895 and sold in 1914
- HMS Bruiser (F127) was a Landing Ship, Tank launched in 1942 and sold in 1946. Converted to a passenger ship in 1951 and scrapped in 1968.
- HMS Bruiser (1945) was a Tank landing ship launched in 1945 as HMS LST 3025. She was renamed HMS Bruiser in 1947 and sold in 1954.
- HMS Bruiser was intended as a Batch 2 Type 22 frigate, but was renamed as Sheffield before being laid down.

== Battle honours ==
Ships named Bruiser have earned the following battle honours:

- Sicily, 1943
- Salerno, 1944
- Anzio, 1944
- Atlantic, 1944
- South France, 1944
- Aegean, 1944
