= HMS Brecon =

Two ships of the Royal Navy have been named HMS Brecon after the Brecon hunt:

- The first HMS Brecon (L76), launched in 1942, was a Hunt-class destroyer.
- The second and current HMS Brecon (M29), launched in 1979, is a Hunt-class mine countermeasures vessel
