= HMS Bulldog =

Seven vessels of the British Royal Navy have been named HMS Bulldog (or HMS Bull Dog), after the bulldog, with an eighth announced:

- The first HMS Bulldog (1794) was a small 4-gun hoy bought in March 1794 and sold later at Jersey in the same year.
- The second HMS Bull Dog (1782) was a 16-gun sloop launched in 1782 but converted to a Royal Navy bomb vessel in 1798. The French captured her in February 1801 when she unwittingly entered the French-held port of Ancona. Boats from HMS Mercury recaptured her in May, but adverse winds prevented her from escaping and the French recaptured her. In September, HMS Champion recaptured her off Gallipoli, Apulia. Bulldog returned to Portsmouth where she became a powder hulk. She was broken up at Portsmouth in December 1829.
- The third HMS Bulldog (1845) was a wooden steam powered paddle sloop launched in 1845. She managed to end the Neapolitan naval bombardment of rebels in Palermo in 1848 by threatening retaliation if the shelling was not ceased. She ran aground in 1865 whilst off the coast of Haiti as part of an expedition against anti-government rebels which had seized the British consulate in Haiti. Unable to get her off the reef, the crew blew her up.
- The fourth HMS Bulldog (1872) was a third-class gunboat of the Ant class, sold for scrapping in 1906.
- The fifth HMS Bulldog (1909) was a Beagle-class destroyer scrapped in 1920.
- The sixth HMS Bulldog (H91) was a destroyer launched in 1930 and scrapped in 1946. She is most famous for the actions of some of her crew in making the first capture of an Enigma machine.
- The seventh HMS Bulldog (A317) was launched in 1967 as the lead ship of the Bulldog-class survey vessels and sold in 2001 for conversion to a private yacht.
- The eighth HMS Bulldog will be a Type 31 frigate.

== Battle honours ==
Ships named Bulldog have earned the following battle honours:

- St Lucia, 1796
- Baltic, 1854−55
- Dardanelles, 1915−16
- English Channel, 1940−45
- Atlantic, 1941−45
- North Africa, 1942
- Arctic, 1942−44

== See also ==
- HMT Bulldog was a trawler, built in 1892 and requisitioned by the Admiralty 1917–1919.
- HMS Vansittart – Royal Navy destroyer whose ship's mascot was Venus, an English Bulldog
