= VOC ship Landskroon =

Landskroon
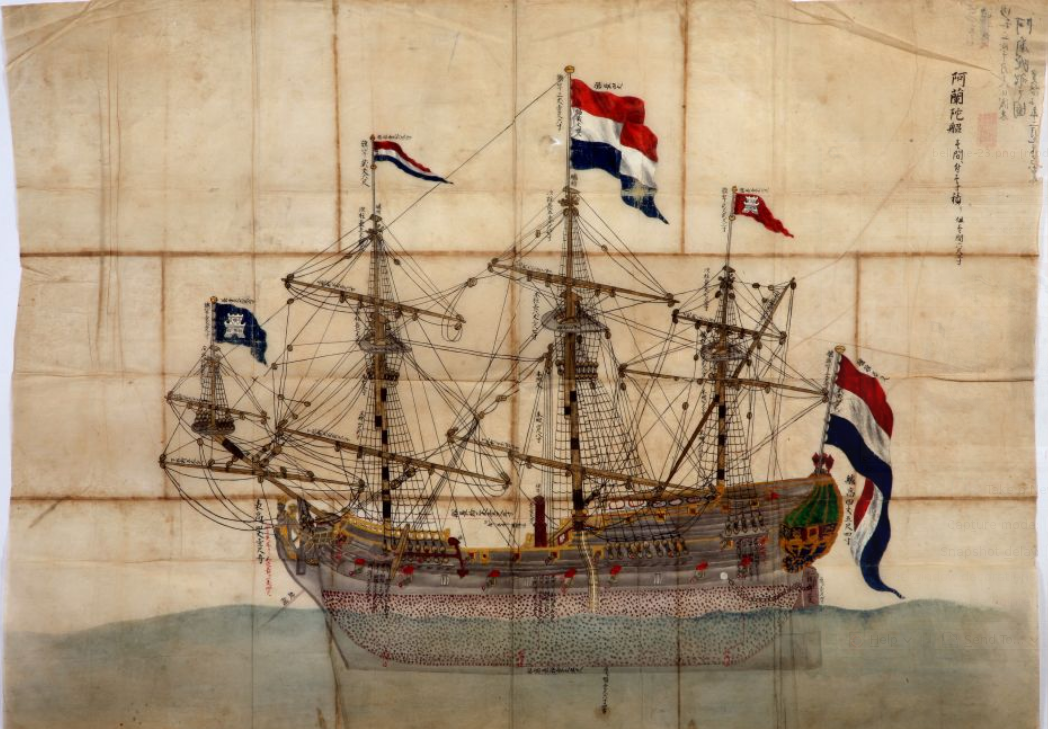
- Japanese representation of Landskroon at Dejima in Nagasaki Bay in 1766.

History

Dutch Republic
- Name: Landskroon
- Owner: Dutch East India Company
- Launched: 1764
- Fate: Broken up in 1780

General characteristics
- Type: Fluyt
- Tons burthen: 1,150 tons
- Length: 42.5 m (139 ft 5 in)
- Sail plan: Full-rigged ship
- Complement: 339 or 322 men
- Armament: 52 guns

Landskroon (Dutch pronunciation: [ˈlɑntskroːn]) was a ship of the Dutch East India Company (VOC) which traded with Japan in the mid-18th century.
