= HMS Bangor =

Two ships of the British Royal Navy have been named HMS Bangor.

- HMS Bangor (J00), the lead ship of the Bangor class of minesweepers in World War II.
- HMS Bangor (M109), a Sandown-class minehunter commissioned in 1999.

== Battle honours ==
Ships named Bangor have earned the following battle honours:

- Dieppe 1942
- Normandy 1944
- English Channel 1944
- Al Faw 2003
