= HMS Biter =

Six ships of the Royal Navy have been named HMS Biter. Another was planned:

- HMS Biter (1797) was a 12-gun gunvessel launched in 1797 and sold in 1802.
- HMS Biter (1804) was a 12-gun gun-brig launched in 1804 and wrecked in 1805.
- HMS Biter was to have been a Teazer-class class wooden screw gunvessel. She was ordered in 1846 but was cancelled in 1849.
- HMS Biter (1855) was a Dapper-class wooden screw gunboat launched in 1855. She became a coal hulk in 1865 and was later renamed T16. She was sold in 1904.
- HMS Biter (1905) was a tender, previously the War Department vessel Sir William Reid. She was transferred in 1905 and sold in 1923.
- HMS Biter (D97) was an escort carrier launched in 1940. She was transferred to the Royal Navy under lend-lease in 1942, transferred to the French Navy in 1945 and renamed Dixmude, used as an accommodation ship from 1956 and was returned to the US Navy and sunk as a target in 1966.
- HMS Biter (P270) is an Archer-class patrol vessel vessel launched in 1985 and currently in service.
