= HMS Bacchus =

Four ships of the Royal Navy have been named HMS Bacchus, after the Greco-Roman deity Bacchus:

- HMS Bacchus (1806) was a 10-gun Adonis-class schooner built in Bermuda in 1806 and captured in 1807.
- HMS Bacchus (1808) was a Dutch 10-gun schooner launched c.1806, that the Royal Navy captured in 1807, took into service in 1808, and broke up in 1812.
- HMS Bacchus (1813) was an 18-gun Cruizer-class brig-sloop launched in 1813 and expended as a breakwater in 1829.
- HMS Arethusa was a 46-gun fifth rate launched in 1817, and renamed HMS Bacchus in 1844 upon her conversion into a hulk; she was broken up in 1883.
