= HMS Bayano =

HMS Bayano may refer to the following ships of the Royal Navy:

- HMS Bayano (1914)
- HMS Bayano (1917)
