= HMS Blast =

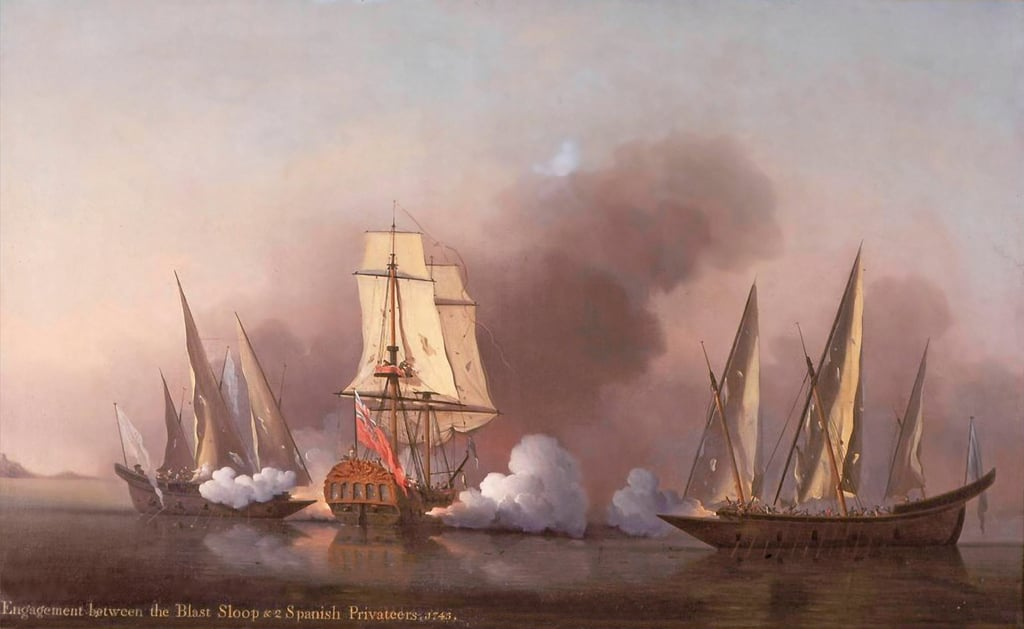
Engagement between the Blast Sloop and two Spanish Privateers, Samuel Scott 1745

HMS Blast has been the name of at least five ships of the Royal Navy:

- HMS Blast (1695), a 6-gun Serpent-class bomb vessel launched in 1695, converted to a storeship in 1721, and broken up in 1724.
- HMS Blast (1740), a Basilisk-class bomb vessel launched in 1740, captured by the Spanish in 1745.
- HMS Blast (1756), a fire ship purchased in 1756.
- HMS Blast (1759), a 8-gun Infernal-class bomb vessel launched in 1759.
- HMS Druid (1776), a 16-gun sloop purchased in 1776, converted to a fire ship in 1779 and renamed HMS Blast, and sold in 1783.
