= HMS Brisk =

HMS Brisk has been the name of more than one ship of the British Royal Navy, and may refer to:

- HMS Brisk (1784), a 16-gun sloop launched in 1784 and sold in 1805
- HMS Brisk (1805), an 18-gun sloop launched in 1805 and sold in 1816
- HMS Brisk (1819), a 10-gun Cherokee-class brig-sloop launched in 1819 and sold in 1843
- HMS Brisk (1851), a steam sloop launched in 1851 and sold in 1870
- HMS Brisk (1886), a torpedo cruiser launched in 1886 and sold in 1906
- HMS Brisk (1910), a destroyer launched in 1910 and sold in 1921
