= HMS Heureux (1800) =

Brig of the Royal Navy

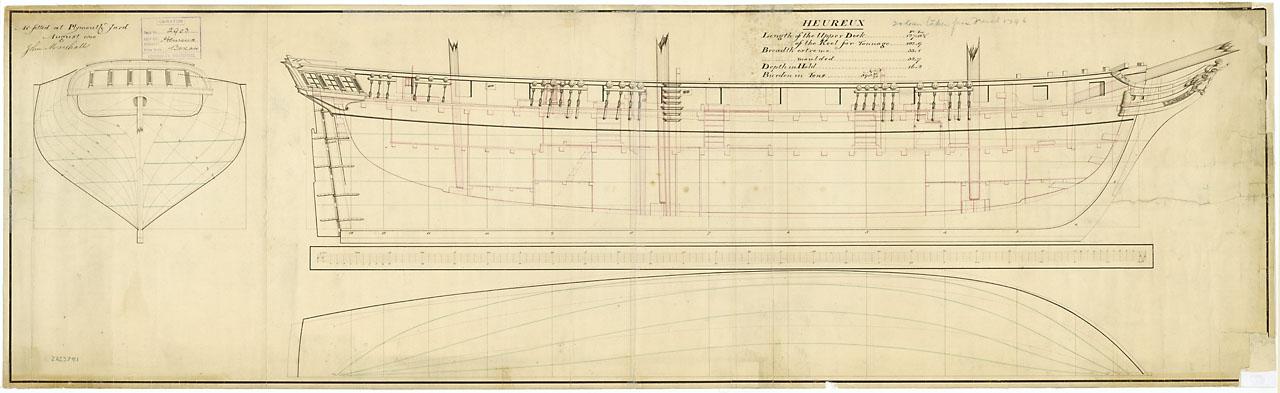
- Heureux

History

France
- Name: Heureux
- Fate: Captured, 5 March 1800

Great Britain
- Name: HMS Heureux
- Acquired: by capture, 5 March 1800
- Commissioned: August 1800
- Fate: Lost at sea, June 1806

General characteristics
- Type: Brig
- Tons burthen: 59818/94 tons (bm)
- Length: 127 ft 8 1/2 in (38.9 m) (overall); 102 ft 9 in (31.3 m) (keel)
- Beam: 32 ft 7 in (9.9 m)
- Depth: 16 ft 2 in (4.9 m)
- Complement: In French service: 220; In British service: 155
- Armament: In French service: 22 × long brass 12-pounders; In British service: 20 × 32-pounder carronades + 2 × 9-pounder bow chasers

Heureux was a 22-gun French privateer brig that the British captured in 1800. She served with the Royal Navy as the 22-gun post ship HMS Heureux. She captured numerous French and Spanish privateers and merchant vessels in the Caribbean Sea before she was lost at sea in 1806. Her fate remains a mystery to this day.

== French privateer ==
The frigate Phoebe, commanded by Captain Robert Barlow, captured the privateer Heureux in the English Channel off Bordeaux on 5 March 1800. (Note: Winfield attributes the capture to Stag on 19 October 1799, but there is no report in the London Gazette of such a capture, whereas the report below is more consistent with the facts of the capture.) Heureux, of 22 long brass 12-pounders and 220 men, mistook Phoebe for an East Indiaman, and approached her. Heureux did not discover her mistake until she had arrived within point-blank musket-shot. She then wore upon Phoebe's weather bow and hauled to the wind on the same tack. Heureux opened fire in an attempt to disable Phoebe's masts, rigging, and sails, and thereby enable Heureux to escape. However, Phoebe's broadside was too powerful and Heureux was forced to strike her colours. Phoebe had three seamen killed, or mortally wounded, and three slightly wounded. Heureux had 18 men killed and 25 wounded, most of whom lost limbs. Eleven former British sailors were found serving among Heureux's crew, and were placed in irons for transportation back to England.

She had been out 42 days but had only taken one prize, a small Portuguese sloop with a cargo of wine. The sloop had been blown out to sea while on her way from Limerick to Galway. Heureux had intended to cruise the West Indies. Instead, she arrived at Plymouth as a prize on 25 March 1800.

Barlow described Heureux as "the most complete flush deck ship I have ever seen, copper fastened, highly finished and of large dimensions". Furthermore, "she will be considered as a most desirable ship for His Majesty's Service."

== British service ==
The Admiralty bought Heureux and she completed her fitting out in November. She was armed with two 9-pounder guns at her bow and twenty 32-pounder carronades for her broadsides. Captain Loftus Bland commissioned her in August 1800 under her existing name. She sailed for the Leeward Islands in February 1801.

Three months after her arrival, on 28 May, some 80 leagues (390 km) to windward of Barbados, Heureux chased down and captured the 16-gun French sloop Egypte from Guadeloupe. The chase lasted 16 hours while Egypte kept up a running fight for three hours during which she neither inflicted nor suffered any casualties. Bland reported that Egypte was said to be the fastest vessel out of Guadeloupe. She and her crew of 103 men had sailed 13 days earlier but had made no captures.

On 16 August, Heureux was between Martinique and St. Lucia when she saw the brig Guachapin in an unequal fight against a Spanish letter of marque armed with eighteen brass 32 and 12-pounder guns. Heureux sailed up as fast as she could but even before she arrived the Spaniard had struck to Guachapin. The two-hour engagement had cost Guachapin two men killed and three wounded, and the Spaniard nearly the same. The Spaniard was Theresa, under the command of an officer of the Spanish Navy, and had a crew of 120 men.

One year later, on 10 August 1803, Heureux and Emerald captured the Dutch ship Surinam Planter, which was sailing from Surinam to Amsterdam. Her cargo consisted of 922 hogsheads of sugar, 342 bales of cotton, and 70,000 lb (32,000 kg) of coffee.

On 23 September 1803 Heureux represented the Royal Navy at the capture of the Batavian Republic's colony at Berbice. The British captured the schooner Serpent, as well many arms, troops and the like. The Navy took Serpent into service as HMS Berbice.

Heureux then captured the French privateer and blockade runner Flibustier (or Flebustier) 40 leagues (190 km) from Barbados on 26 February 1804. Although pierced for 14 guns, Flibustier was armed with six French 6-pounders. She had 68 men on board, was new and had provisions for a long cruise from Guadeloupe but apparently had made no captures. On 25 June, Heureux recaptured the English ship Esther, which was carrying a cargo of coals and potatoes. In September Heureux recaptured the English ship Salamander, a Guineaman.

Then on 9 December Heureux, now under Captain George Younghusband, captured the Spanish merchant ship San Sebastian, laden with wine. Four days later Heureux captured Santo Christo, which was carrying military stores and merchandise. These may have been two of the three Spanish vessels arrived at Barbados on 9 January 1805, prizes to Heureux and HMS Amelia (1796). One was the former Duke of York Packet, which had been captured in 1803.

On 31 May 1805, off Cape Nicola Mole, Heureux captured the French felucca privateer Desiree. Desiree was armed with one carriage gun and had a crew of 40 men.

On 28 December Heureux and Kingfisher captured the Spanish merchant brig Solidad, which was taking brandy and wine from Cádiz to Veracruz. Early in the new year, on 15 January 1806, Heureux captured the Spanish letter of marque Amelia about four miles (6.4 km) off Trinidad. Amelia was armed with eight 6-pounder guns and carried a crew of 40 men. She was carrying a valuable cargo of dry goods and wine from A Coruña to Cumaná, Venezuela.

On 21 January 1806 Heureux captured Emilie. Then on 15 (or 22) February, Heureux captured the French privateer Bellone after a short chase. Bellone carried fourteen 9-pounder guns and had a crew of 117 men. She had on board $8,000, which was her owner's share of a prize that she had carried into Cayenne. Four days later Heureux captured the French privateer Bocune after an eight-hour chase. Bocune carried three guns and a crew of 60 men.

Bellone and Bocune may have been the vessels that Lloyd's List reported Younghusband had sent into Barbados. The report referred to one privateer of 10 guns and 110 men, and another of three guns and 70 men.

On 8 March Heureux captured the privateer Huron (or Hurone), off Barbados. Huron carried sixteen 18-pounder carronades and two long 9-pounder guns. As Heureux pulled alongside, Huron opened fire but return fire from Heureux soon silenced her. Huron lost her captain, second lieutenant and two other men killed, and seven men wounded; Heureux had no casualties. (Note: In January 1815, head money was paid for Emilie, Bellone, and Hurone. A first-class share was worth £285 10s 9½d; a fifth-class share was worth £1 5s 8½d.)

Heureux took her last prize on 30 March. Agamemnon was 56 miles (90 km) north of Barbados when she saw two strange sails. As she got closer she saw that they were Heureux chasing a schooner. Agamemnon maneuvered to cut off the schooner and both British ships came alongside the prize, with Heureux taking possession. The prize turned out to be the French privateer Dame Ernouf, of sixteen 6-pounder guns, all of which she had thrown overboard during the chase, and one 12-pounder gun. She also had a crew of 115 men. Dame Ernouf was 14 days out of Guadeloupe but had made no captures.

== Fate ==
In March 1806 Captain John Morrison was assigned to replace Younghusband. (Because Edward Berry of Agamemnon wrote the letter reporting the capture of Dame Ernouf, it is not clear whether Morrison replaced Younghusband before or after her capture.)

Heureux was ordered to transfer her position from the West Indies to Halifax, Nova Scotia in the spring of 1806. She failed to arrive in Halifax, and despite a search, she and her crew had disappeared without trace somewhere along the U.S. seaboard. She was presumed lost in June 1806 with all hands, that is, about 155 crew.
