= Blackpool, Devon =

There are three hamlets called Blackpool in Devon, England. These are in Brixton, near Plymouth, in Ilsington near Newton Abbot, and at Blackpool Sands on Start Bay respectively.
