= USS General Gates (1764) =

History

United States
- Name: USS General Gates
- Namesake: Horatio Gates
- Launched: 1764
- Acquired: captured, 29 August 1777; purchased, 19 December 1777
- Homeport: Boston, Massachusetts
- Fate: Sold, June 1779

General characteristics
- Type: Brigantine
- Armament: 18 guns

Service record

USS General Gates was an 18-gun brigantine of the Continental Navy active between 1778 and 1779.

Built as the merchant brigantine Industrious Bee in 1764 at Bristol, England, for operations by Clapman & Co., the British ship was captured on 29 August 1777 by Captain John Skimmer in the Continental schooner USS Lee, while bound from Gibraltar for Newfoundland. The ship was purchased on 19 December by the Navy Board at Boston, fitted out with 18 guns, and renamed General Gates, Captain John Skimmer in command.

== Service history ==
General Gates sailed from Marblehead on 24 May 1778, joining privateer brigantine Hawk off Cape Ann to cruise on the Newfoundland Banks. After capturing the ship Jenny and brigantines Thomas and Nancy, the two ships parted company early in August. Thereafter General Gates captured the schooner Polly.

On 3 August 1778 she intercepted the brigantine Montague under Captain Nelson, who defended his ship in an epic engagement of five hours. After expending her ammunition, Montague resorted to firing "every piece of iron of all kinds that could be rammed into the tube of the cannon," including jack knives, crowbars, and even the captain's speaking tube. A double-headed shot from General Gates crashed into Captain Nelson's cabin. Taking it up, Nelson fired it from one of his own guns. "This shot striking a swivel gun on the State's brig divided, and one part of it glancing instantly killed the active and brave Captain Skimmer." It was two more hours before Montague struck her colors and capitulated to General Gates with Lt. Dennis in command. General Gates returned to Boston Harbor with prizes Polly and Montague on 31 August 1778.

General Gates departed Boston on 14 November in company with Providence for Nova Scotian waters. She captured the schooner Friendship off Casco on 4 December and two days later, parted by a gale from Providence, subsequently cruised in West Indian waters. She captured schooner General Leslie off Bermuda in the first part of February 1779, then joined Hazard at Martinique. Together they captured brigs Active on 16 March and Union the following day.

General Gates returned to Boston harbor on 13 April 1779, so unseaworthy from battering gales that her crew, at times, had despaired of ever reaching port. She was ordered sold on 2 June 1779. In August she was loaned by the Navy Board to the Deputy Commissary of Prisoners at Boston to convey prisoners to New York. On completion of this mission, she was sold.

== See also ==
- List of ships captured in the 18th century
