= HMS Basing =

HMS Basing may refer to:

- English ship Basing (1654), a 22-gun ship launched in 1654, renamed Guernsey in 1660, became a fireship in 1688, broken up in 1693
- HMS Basing (1693), purchased in 1693 and captured by France in 1694
