= HMS Bicester =

Three ships of the Royal Navy have been named HMS Bicester, named after (the fox hunt in) Bicester, Oxfordshire.

- HMS Bicester (1917) was a Hunt-class minesweeper that served in World War I.
- HMS Bicester (L34) was a Hunt-class destroyer that served in World War II.
- HMS Bicester (M36) was a Hunt-class mine countermeasures vessel.
