= HMS Boreas =

Four ships of the Royal Navy have borne the name HMS Boreas, after Boreas, the personification of the north wind in Greek mythology. A fourth was planned to bear the name, but never actually did:

- HMS Boreas (1757) was a 28-gun sixth rate launched in 1757 and declared obsolete and scrapped in 1770.
- HMS Boreas (1774) was a 28-gun sixth rate launched in 1774, used as a slop ship from 1797 and sold in 1802.
- HMS Boreas (1806) was a Laurel-class post ship launched in 1806. She wrecked off the coast of Guernsey on 28 November 1807 with the loss of half her crew of 154 men.
- HMS Boreas was to have been the name assigned to the captured Danish ship Havfru, after her acceptance into service in 1807 as HMS Havfruen. The name was not used though.
- HMS Boreas (H77) was a B-class destroyer launched in 1930. She was loaned to the Greek navy and between 1944 and 1951 served as HHMS Salamis. The Greeks returned her in 1951. She was sold that same year and scrapped in 1952.

== See also ==
- French ship Borée
