= HMS Biter (P270) =

Archer-class patrol vessel of the Royal Navy

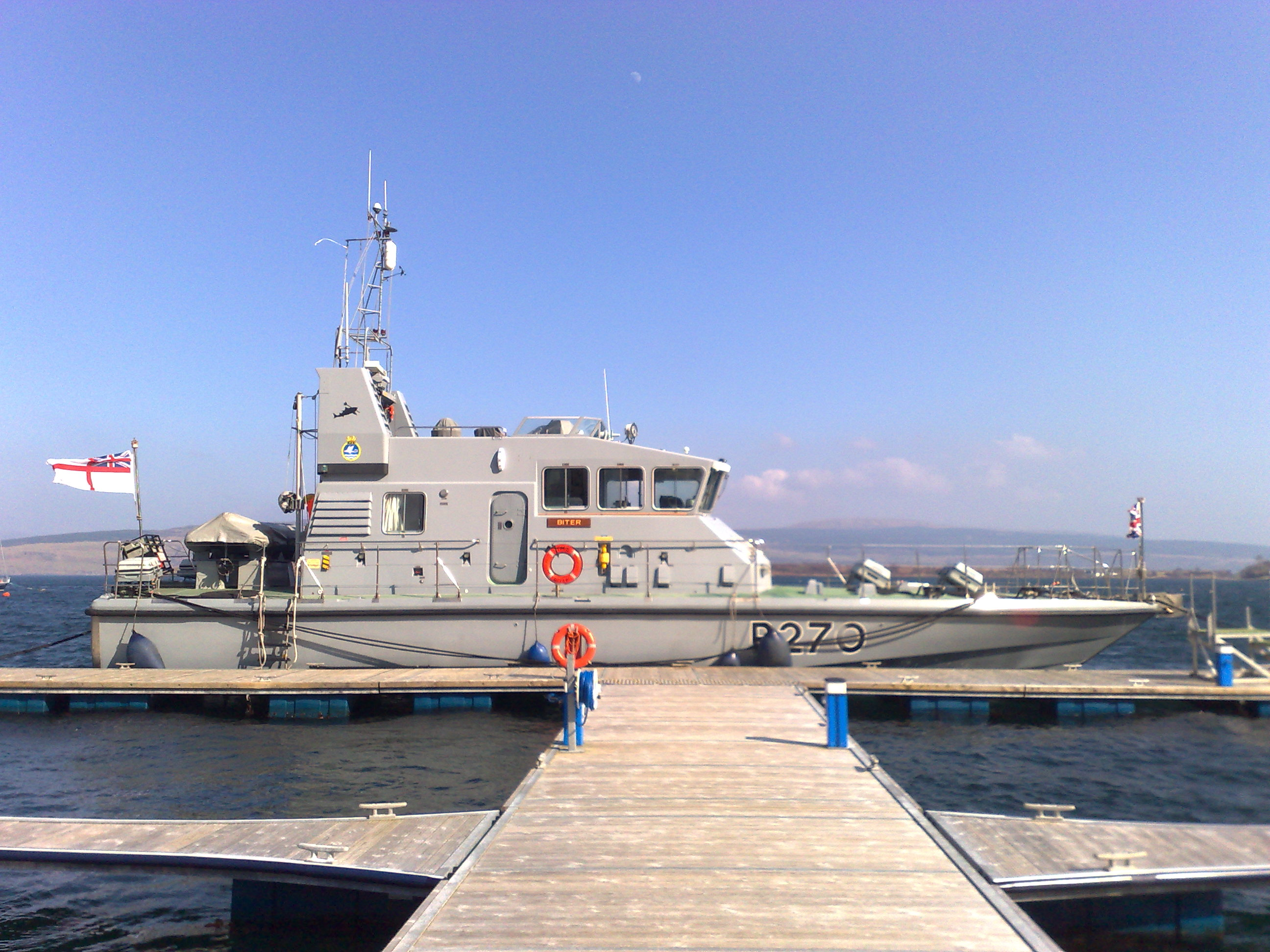
- HMS Biter alongside in Tobermory, Scotland in April 2009

History

United Kingdom
- Name: HMS Biter
- Operator: Royal Navy
- Builder: Watercraft Ltd., Shoreham-by-Sea
- Launched: 17 October 1985
- Commissioned: 25 January 1986
- In service: RNR: 1986; URNU: 1990
- Home port: HMS Eaglet, Liverpool
- Identification: MMSI number: 235009860; Callsign: GAAR; Pennant number: P270
- Status: In active service
- Badge

General characteristics
- Class & type: Archer-class patrol vessel
- Displacement: 54 tonnes
- Length: 20.8 m (68 ft)
- Beam: 5.8 m (19 ft)
- Draught: 1.8 m (5 ft 11 in)
- Propulsion: 2 shafts, Cat C18 ACERT diesels, 873 bhp
- Speed: 14 kn (26 km/h); 45 kn (83 km/h) (Hull design, but limited due to engine fitted)
- Range: 550 nmi (1,020 km)
- Complement: 18 (training) (Note: 5 ship's company, 1 training officer, 12 URNU students.); 12 (operational)
- Sensors & processing systems: Decca 1216 navigation radar
- Armament: 1 × Oerlikon 20 mm cannon on fo'c'sle ("for but not with"); 3 × General purpose machine guns (Note: When operational and not in URNU role.)

HMS Biter is an Archer-class P2000-type patrol and training vessel of the British Royal Navy. She is assigned to Manchester & Salford Universities Royal Naval Unit, a Royal Naval Reserve unit based in Manchester. The ship is based at HMS Eaglet, the Royal Naval Headquarters in Liverpool. As part of her sea training programme, she often makes visits to local ports for ceremonial visits or occasions.

== Construction ==
She was built by Watercraft Ltd. at Shoreham-by-Sea in 1986 as one of ten vessels ordered as the P2000 class. The class was based on a design of an Omani coastguard cutter built by Watercraft Marine. They are twin-shaft vessels with moulded glass-reinforced plastic hulls. She has no dedicated armament though she can be fitted with pintle-mounted L7 7.62 mm GPMG machine guns. Biter is part of the First Patrol Boat Squadron (1PBS) based at HMNB Portsmouth.

During overhaul, two Cat C18 ACERT propulsion engines were installed by Finning Power Systems. The two diesel engines, each rated at 873 bhp at 2200 rpm, form part of the propulsion package along with ZF 2000 RV marine reverse reduction gearboxes and ZF 9000 Series ClearCommand controls.

== Service history ==
Biter was commissioned in 1986 into the Royal Navy and she was attached to Mersey Division, a Royal Naval Reserve Unit. In 1990, she was transferred to Manchester and Salford University Royal Naval Unit. Biter's time at sea includes weekends visiting local ports such as Holyhead, Douglas and Barrow-in-Furness and deployments during the Easter and summer holidays when she visits ports around the UK and northern Europe. She is attached to the Manchester and Salford University Royal Naval Unit (URNU) and her main role is to provide Naval training to URNU students on weekends and in Easter and summer deployments.

As part of her sea training programme, she often makes visits to local ports for ceremonial visits or occasions. In May 1993, she attended the Battle of the Atlantic 50th Anniversary Fleet Review. In December 2005, she helped to start the Round the World Clipper Race in Liverpool. Biter visited Barrow-in-Furness in July 2007 for the launching of HMS Astute, the first of class of the Astute-class submarine. She also regularly visits her affiliated town of Silloth in Cumbria for Remembrance Sunday commemorations.

In the early 2020s, Biter, along with other Archer-class vessels, was given a more operational role as part of the reconstituted Coastal Forces Squadron. In early 2024, Biter and three of her sister ships deployed to northern Norway as part of the NATO exercise "Steadfast Defender". The vessel was subsequently lifted back to the U.K. on the sealift ship MV Hartland Point possibly due to mechanical problems.

== Ship's company ==
Biter is commanded by a lieutenant and is permanently crewed by four other Royal Navy personnel. Chief petty officers fill the roles of executive officer and marine engineering officer, and the yeoman and weapons engineering officer are junior rates of the appropriate service branches. With students embarked (up to a maximum of 12), a training officer is usually present who is typically an RNR lieutenant or sub-lieutenant.

== Affiliates ==
- HMS Duncan
- Royal Naval Reserve (RNR)
- Manchester and Salford Universities Air Squadron (MASUAS)
- Manchester & Salford Universities Officer Training Corps (MSUOTC)
- Merchant Taylor's School CCF
- The North West of England & Isle of Man Reserve Forces and Cadets Association (NW RFCA)
- Silloth, Cumbria
- Manchester District Sea Cadets
