= HMS Blackpool =

Two ships of the Royal Navy have borne the name HMS Blackpool, after the Lancashire seaside town of Blackpool:

- HMS Blackpool (J27) was a Bangor-class minesweeper launched in 1940 and sold in 1946.
- HMS Blackpool (F77) was a Whitby-class frigate launched in 1957. She was loaned to the Royal New Zealand Navy between 1966 and 1971 and was sold for scrapping in 1978.
