= HMS Bideford =

Five ships of the Royal Navy have borne the name HMS Bideford, or the archaic variant HMS Biddeford, after the port town of Bideford, Devon. A sixth was planned but never built:

- HMS Biddeford (1695) was a 24-gun sixth rate launched in 1695 and wrecked in 1699.
- HMS Biddeford (1711) was a 20-gun sixth rate launched in 1711. She was rebuilt in 1727, and foundered in 1736.
- HMS Bideford (1740) was a 24-gun sixth rate launched in 1740 and broken up by 1754.
- HMS Bideford (1756) was a 20-gun sixth rate launched in 1756 and wrecked in 1761.
- HMS Bideford was to have been a Hunt-class minesweeper, but was cancelled in 1918.
- HMS Bideford (L43) was a Shoreham-class sloop launched in 1931 and sold for scrapping in 1949.
