= HMS Bootle =

HMS Bootle has been the name of two Royal Navy vessels, after the English town.

- HMS Bootle (1918), a Hunt-class minesweeper launched 1918, sold 1923. Renamed from Buckie prior to launch.
- HMS Bootle (J143), a Bangor-class minesweeper launched 1941, sold 1948. Arrived at Charlestown in June 1949 for breaking up.
