= HMS Bustler =

Several ships of the British Royal Navy have borne the name Bustler:

- HMS Bustler (1782) was the mercantile Shillelagh, which the Admiralty purchased in January 1782. She was sold in 1788 and returned to mercantile service. In 1793 she became a privateer and made one notable capture. She then became a West Indiaman that the French captured in 1795.
- HMS Bustler (1805) was a Confounder-class brig that the French captured in 1808 when she grounded near Cap Gris-Nez and attempts to burn her failed. The French Navy took her into service as Bustler. The British recaptured her in 1813 while she was serving as station ship at Zierikzee after attempts to scuttle her failed.
- HMS Bustler (1853) was a paddle tug, formerly Merry Andrew, purchased in 1855 for Crimean War service. She was sold in 1893
- HMS Bustler (1890), a 346 GRT iron paddle tug, formerly Conqueror, purchased in 1896; sold in 1921
- HMS Bustler (1941) was a diesel rescue tug launched at Leith in 1941 that participated in Operation Overlord and was later transferred to the RFA. She was sold in 1973, subsequently trading as Mocni and Smjeli and then broken up in 1989
- RMAS Bustler (A225) was a diesel dockyard tug built at Hessle in 1981 for the Royal Maritime Auxiliary Service. She was later operated by Serco Denholm as SD Bustler, and sold in 2013.
