= HMS Bonetta =

Thirteen ships of the Royal Navy have borne the name HMS Bonetta:

- HMS Bonetta (1673) was a 4-gun sloop launched in 1673 and sold in 1687.
- HMS Bonetta (1699) was a 4-gun sloop launched in 1699 and sold in 1712.
- HMS Bonetta (1718) was a sloop in service in 1718 and sold in 1719.
- HMS Bonetta (1721) was a 3-gun sloop launched in 1721 and sold in 1731.
- HMS Bonetta (1732) was a 14-gun sloop launched in 1732. She foundered in 1744.
- HMS Bonetta (1756) was a 10-gun sloop launched in 1756 and sold in 1776. Lloyd's Register (1778) shows the Hawke, of 220 tons (bm), Thames-built, as the former sloop-of-war Bonetta. It gives Hawke's master as S. Gribble, her owner as Calvert & Co., her armament as two 12-pounder and twelve 9-pounder guns, and her trade as privateer.
- HMS Bonetta (1779) was a 14-gun sloop launched in 1779. She was at Yorktown, but rather than scuttling her, the British handed her over to French on 19 October 1781 under the terms of capitulation. The French sent her as a cartel to New York, after which she returned to their control. On 3 January 1782 HMS Amphion recaptured her. Bonetta was broken up in 1797.
- HMS Bonetta (1781) was an 18-gun sloop, formerly the civilian Roebuck. She was purchased in 1781, renamed HMS Swan in 1782 and capsized later that year.
- HMS Bonetta (1798) was the French privateer Huit Amis, launched at Bordeaux in 1798 that the British Royal Navy captured in May. In her brief naval career she captured a number of small prizes, one of them a 2-gun privateer. Bonetta was wrecked in 1801.
- HMS Bonetta (1803) was the mercantile Adamant, launched at Bridlington in 1798 that the Navy purchased in 1803, converted to a 20-gun sloop, and sold in 1810. She then returned to mercantile service under her previous name of Adamant. In 1816 she brought the first free settlers to Hobart, Van Diemen's Land. She then left to engage in whaling and was last reported to be at Timor in 1818.
- HMS Bonetta (1836) was a 3-gun brigantine launched in 1836 and broken up by 1861.
- HMS Bonetta (1871) was an Ant-class iron screw gunboat launched in 1871 and sold as the civilian salvage vessel Disperser in 1909.
- HMS Bonetta (1907) was a destroyer launched in 1907 on speculation and accepted by the navy in 1909. She was reclassified as a B-class destroyer in 1913 and was sold in 1920.

== See also ==
- HMS Bonita
