= HMS Boadicea =

Four ships and a shore establishment of the Royal Navy have borne the name HMS Boadicea after Boadicea, queen of the Iceni in Roman Britain, whilst another ship was planned but never completed:

- HMS Boadicea (1797) was a 38-gun fifth rate launched in 1797. She was used for harbour service from 1854 and was broken up in 1858.
- HMS Boadicea was to have been a wood screw frigate. She was ordered in 1861 but was cancelled in 1863.
- HMS Boadicea (1875) was a Bacchante-class corvette launched in 1875 and sold in 1905
- HMS Boadicea (1908) was a Boadicea-class cruiser launched in 1908. She was placed on harbour service from 1921 and was sold in 1926.
- HMS Boadicea was a B-class destroyer launched in 1930 and sunk in 1944.
- HMS Boadicea II was a shore establishment and parent ship for armed patrol trawlers based at Kingstown between 1915 and 1919, and Holyhead, in 1915.
- HMS Boadicea was considered as a name for one of the Type 22 frigates, but the name HMS Coventry was selected instead.
