= HMS Ballinderry =

1943 River-class frigate of the Royal Navy

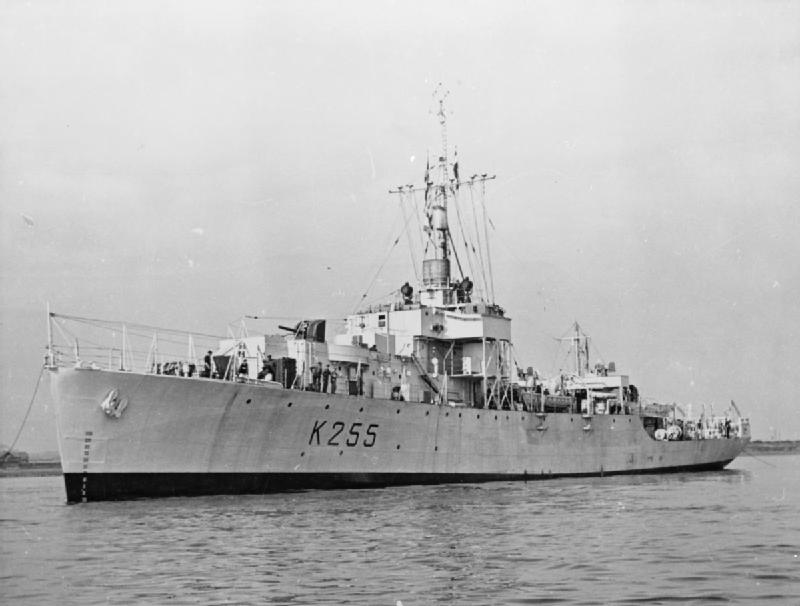
- HMS Ballinderry

History

United Kingdom
- Name: Ballinderry
- Ordered: 20 June 1941
- Builder: Blyth Shipbuilding & Drydock Co. Ltd, Blyth; Hawthorn Leslie & Co., Hebburn-on-Tyne
- Laid down: 6 November 1941
- Launched: 7 December 1942
- Commissioned: 2 September 1943
- Identification: Pennant number: K255
- Fate: Scrapped, 7 July 1961

General characteristics
- Displacement: 1,370 long tons (1,390 t; 1,530 short tons); 1,830 long tons (1,860 t; 2,050 short tons) (deep load)
- Length: 283 ft (86.3 m) p/p; 301.25 ft (91.8 m)o/a
- Beam: 36 ft 6 in (11.1 m)
- Draught: 9 ft (2.7 m); 13 ft (4.0 m) (deep load)
- Propulsion: 2 × Admiralty 3-drum boilers, 2 shafts, reciprocating vertical triple expansion, 5,500 ihp (4,100 kW); (except Cam, Chelmer, Ettrick, Halladale, Helmsdale, and Tweed; Parsons single reduction steam turbines, 6,500 shp (4,800 kW)
- Speed: 20 knots (37 km/h; 23 mph); 20.5 knots (38.0 km/h; 23.6 mph) (turbine ships)
- Range: 7,200 nautical miles (13,300 km; 8,300 mi) at 12 knots (22 km/h; 14 mph) with;440 long tons (450 t; 490 short tons) oil fuel
- Complement: 107
- Armament: 2 × QF 4 in (102 mm) /40 Mk.XIX guns, single mounts CP Mk.XXIII; Up to 10 × QF 20 mm Oerlikon A/A on twin mounts Mk.V and single mounts Mk.III; 1 × Hedgehog 24 spigot A/S projector; 8 x depth charge throwers, 2 x rails, Up to 150 depth charges

HMS Ballinderry was a River-class frigate of the Royal Navy which served during the Second World War.

Ballinderry was ordered 20 June 1941 as part of the River-class building programme. The vessel was laid down on 6 November 1941 by Blyth Shipbuilding & Drydock Co. Ltd at Blyth and launched 7 December 1942.

== War service ==
After commissioning and trials, Ballinderry conducted work up exercises at Tobermory before commencing operations as a convoy escort. On 10 January 1945, Ballinderry, along with HMS Kilbirnie, rescued 50 survivors from the British Merchant vessel Blackheath that had been torpedoed and damaged by U-870, west of Gibraltar.

== Postwar service ==
Ballinderry was reduced to reserve at Harwich in 1947. The ship was refitted at Liverpool in 1951, before returning to reserve at Harwich, where she remained until 1954. In 1955, Ballinderry, still in reserve, moved to Barry in Wales. On 7 July 1961 the frigate was sold to Thos. W. Ward for scrapping at their Barrow breaking yard.
