= HMS Buttercup =

Two ships of the Royal Navy have borne the name HMS Buttercup, named for the buttercup flower:

- HMS Buttercup (1915) was an Arabis-class sloop that Barclay Curle and Company, Whiteinch, built and launched on 24 October 1915. On 25 December 1917 she rammed and helped sink SM U-87. The Royal Navy sold Buttercup on 5 February 1920, whereupon she became the mercantile salvage vessel Semper Paratus. The Italian Navy acquired and sailed her from 1933 as Teseo; Allied bombers sank her at Trapani on 11 April 1943.
- HMS Buttercup (K193) was a Flower-class corvette that Harland & Wolff Ltd., Belfast, launched on 10 April 1941. She served from 23 April 1942 to 20 December 1944 in the Royal Navy Section Belge, crewed with Belgian volunteers. Transferred on 20 December 1944 to Royal Norwegian Navy as HNoMS Buttercup. Norway bought her in 1946 and renamed her HNoMS Nordkyn. In 1956 she was sold and her buyers converted her to a diesel-driven whaler named Thoris. She was scrapped in 1969.
