= HMS Bird =

Sloop of the Royal Navy

History

Great Britain
- Name: HMS Bird
- Builder: Henry Bird, Rotherhithe
- Launched: 1764
- Completed: August 1764
- Acquired: May 1764
- Commissioned: 1764
- Decommissioned: 1775
- Fate: Broken up at Deptford, March 1775

General characteristics
- Class & type: 8-gun survey sloop
- Tons burthen: 75 20/94 (bm)
- Length: 58 ft 6 in (17.8 m) (overall); 45 ft 5 in (13.8 m) (keel)
- Beam: 17 ft 7 in (5.4 m)
- Depth of hold: 8 ft 1 in (2.5 m)
- Propulsion: Sails
- Sail plan: snow-rigged
- Complement: 30
- Armament: 8 guns (unknown poundage)

HMS Bird was an 8-gun survey sloop of the Royal Navy, in service from 1764 to 1775 and engaged in an early coastal survey of Ireland.

The small and lightly armed vessel was purchased on the stocks in May 1764 from shipwright Henry Bird of Rotherithe. As designed, Bird's overall length was 58 ft 6 in (17.8 m) with a beam of 17 ft 7 in (5.4 m) and hold depth of 8 ft 1 in (2.5 m). She measured 75 20/94 tons burthen and was armed with 8 small guns.

She was fitted out at Deptford dockyard between May and August 1764 at a total cost of £664 and commissioned thereafter under Lieutenant John Cowan. Launched in 1764, she spent four years conducting coastal survey work along the Irish shore, returning to Deptford for refitting in 1769.

Bird was broken up at Deptford Dockyard in March 1775.

== Bibliography ==
- Colledge, J. J.; Warlow, Ben (2010) [1969]. Ships of the Royal Navy: The Complete Record of All Fighting Ships of the Royal Navy (4th Rev ed.). Newbury, Berkshire: Casemate. ISBN 978-1-935149-07-1. OCLC 603386630.
- Winfield, Rif (2007). British Warships of the Age of Sail 1714–1792: Design, Construction, Careers and Fates. Seaforth. ISBN 9781844157006.
