= USS Edgar G. Chase =

Evarts-class destroyer escort

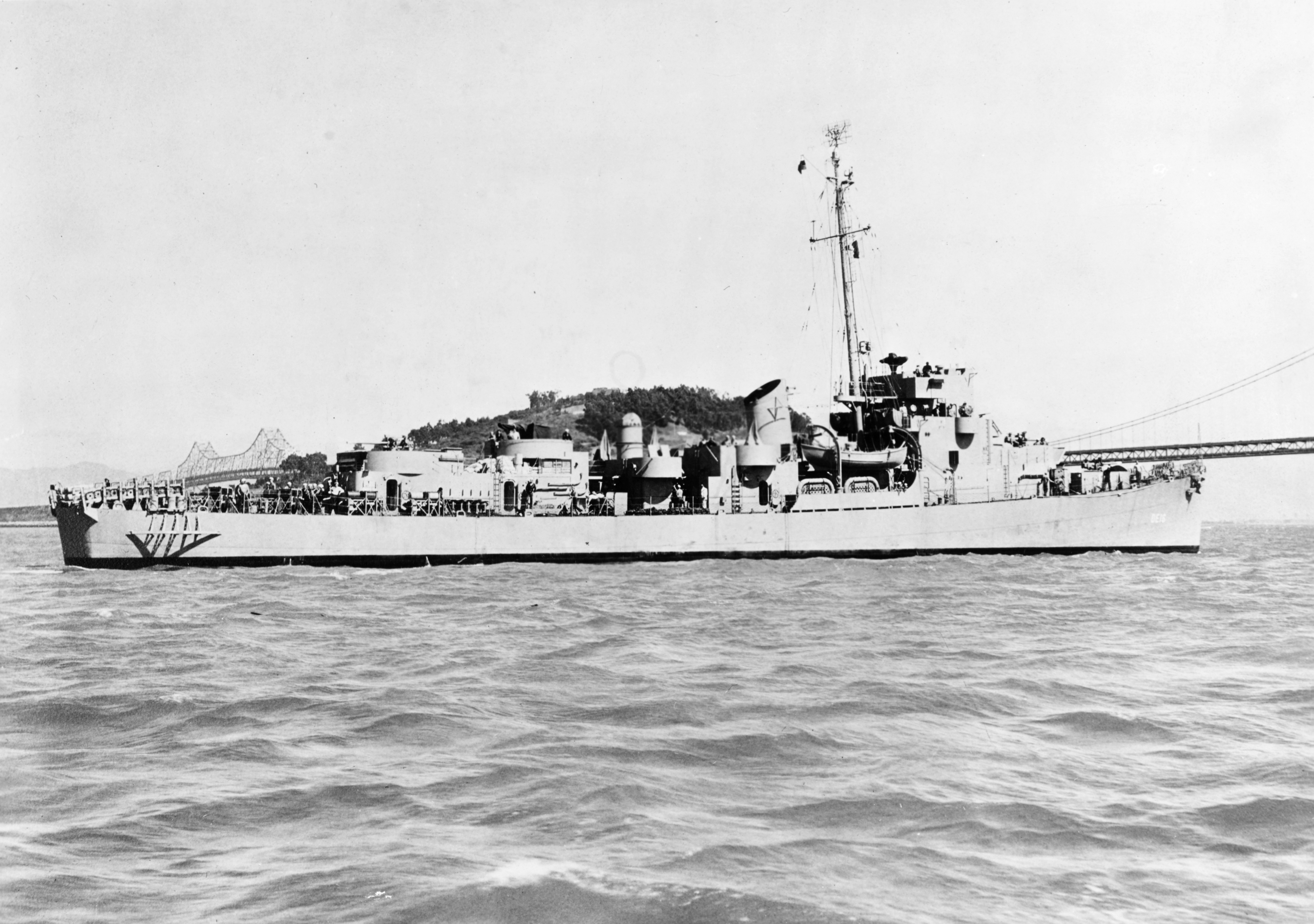
- USS Edgar G. Chase (DE-16) in San Francisco Bay, in 1943

History

United States
- Name: USS Edgar G. Chase (DE-16)
- Builder: Mare Island Navy Yard
- Laid down: 14 March 1942
- Launched: 26 September 1942 as HMS Burges (BDE-16)
- Commissioned: 20 March 1943 as USS Edgar G. Chase (DE-16)
- Decommissioned: 16 October 1945
- Stricken: 1 November 1945
- Fate: Sold for scrap on 18 March 1947

General characteristics
- Class & type: Evarts-class destroyer escort
- Displacement: 1,140 (standard); 1,430 tons (full)
- Length: 283 ft 6 in (86.4 m) (waterline); 289 ft 5 in (88.21 m) (overall))
- Beam: 35 ft 2 in (10.7 m)
- Draft: 11 ft (3.4 m) (max)
- Propulsion: 4 General Motors Model 16-278A diesel engines with electric drive; 6,000 shp (4,500 kW); 2 screws
- Speed: 21 kn (39 km/h)
- Range: 4,150 nm
- Complement: 15 officers, 183 enlisted
- Armament: 3 × 3 in (76 mm) cal Mk 22 dual purpose guns (1×3); 4 × 1.1"/75 caliber gun (1×4); 9 × Oerlikon 20 mm Mk 4 AA cannons; 1 × Hedgehog Projector Mk 10 (144 rounds); 8 × Mk 6 depth charge projectors; 2 × Mk 9 depth charge tracks

USS Edgar G. Chase (DE-16) was an Evarts-class "short-hull" destroyer escort in the service of the United States Navy named after Edgar Griffith Chase, executive officer of a destroyer lost at Guadalcanal in 1942.

Edgar G. Chase was launched on 26 September 1942 by Mare Island Navy Yard, Solano County, California as HMS Burges (BDE-16); sponsored for British Lend-Lease by Mrs. Ernest H. Wichels, but retained by the USN and assigned the name Edgar G. Chase on 19 February 1943; and commissioned 20 March 1943.

== Design ==
The Evarts-class destroyer escorts were 289 ft 5 in (88.21 m) long overall, and they had a beam of 35 ft 2 in (10.72 m). They had an average draft of 10 ft 1 in (3.07 m) at their full load displacement of 1,416 long tons (1,439 t). Each ship had a normal crew numbered 156 officers and sailors.

Edgar G. Chase was propelled by a pair of diesel motors manufactured by General Motors, which drove a pair of screw propellers. Her propulsion system was rated to produce 6,000 brake horsepower (4,500 kW) for a top speed of 19.5 knots (36.1 km/h; 22.4 mph). Oil storage amounted to between 131 and 197 long tons (133 and 200 t), which allowed a cruising radius of up to 6,000 nautical miles (11,000 km; 6,900 mi) at an economical pace of 10 knots (19 km/h; 12 mph).

The ship's armament consisted of a main battery of three 3-inch (76 mm) /50-caliber guns in individual pivot mounts, which could be used against air or surface targets. These were supported by a light anti-aircraft battery that initially consisted of four 1.1 in (28 mm) /75-caliber guns in a quadruple mount and nine 20 mm (0.79 in) Oerlikon guns. For attacks against submarines, the ship was equipped with a Hedgehog mortar, eight depth charge throwers, and two depth charge racks.

== Service history ==
Edgar G. Chase reported to the Submarine chaser Training Center at Miami, Florida, 4 June 1943, and for the next year trained student officers and patrolled off Florida. After a voyage in August 1944 from Norfolk, Virginia, to Recife, Brazil, screening Tripoli, and returning with Solomons. Edgar G. Chase sailed from New York on 19 September with a slow-moving convoy for England. With bad weather, the passage took a month; she got back to Norfolk on 22 November.

Edgar G. Chase made three voyages as convoy escort from New York and Norfolk to Oran from 19 December 1944 – 30 May 1945.

On 20 July, she returned to Miami, Florida, and her original training duty with the Small Craft Training Center.

She arrived at Charleston, South Carolina on 9 September and was decommissioned there on 16 October 1945, being sold for scrap on 18 March 1947.

== Awards ==
- American Campaign Medal
- European-African-Middle Eastern Campaign Medal
- World War II Victory Medal
