= HMS Barossa =

HMS Barossa or HMS Barrosa, named for the Battle of Barrosa (1811), has been the name of four ships of the British Royal Navy:

- HMS Barrosa (1812), a 36-gun fifth rate launched in 1812 and sold in 1841
- HMS Barossa (1860), a wooden screw corvette with J. Watt and Co. engines, the lead ship of her class, launched in 1860 at Woolwich. She bombarded Shimonseki in 1864, and twice visited China. She was scrapped in 1877.
- HMS Barrosa (1889), a third-class cruiser launched in 1889 and sold in 1905
- HMS Barrosa (D68), a Battle-class destroyer launched in 1945 and sold for scrap in 1968

== See also ==
- SS Barossa, a bulk carrier built in 1938
