= HMS Sabre (P285) =

1992 Scimitar-class patrol vessel

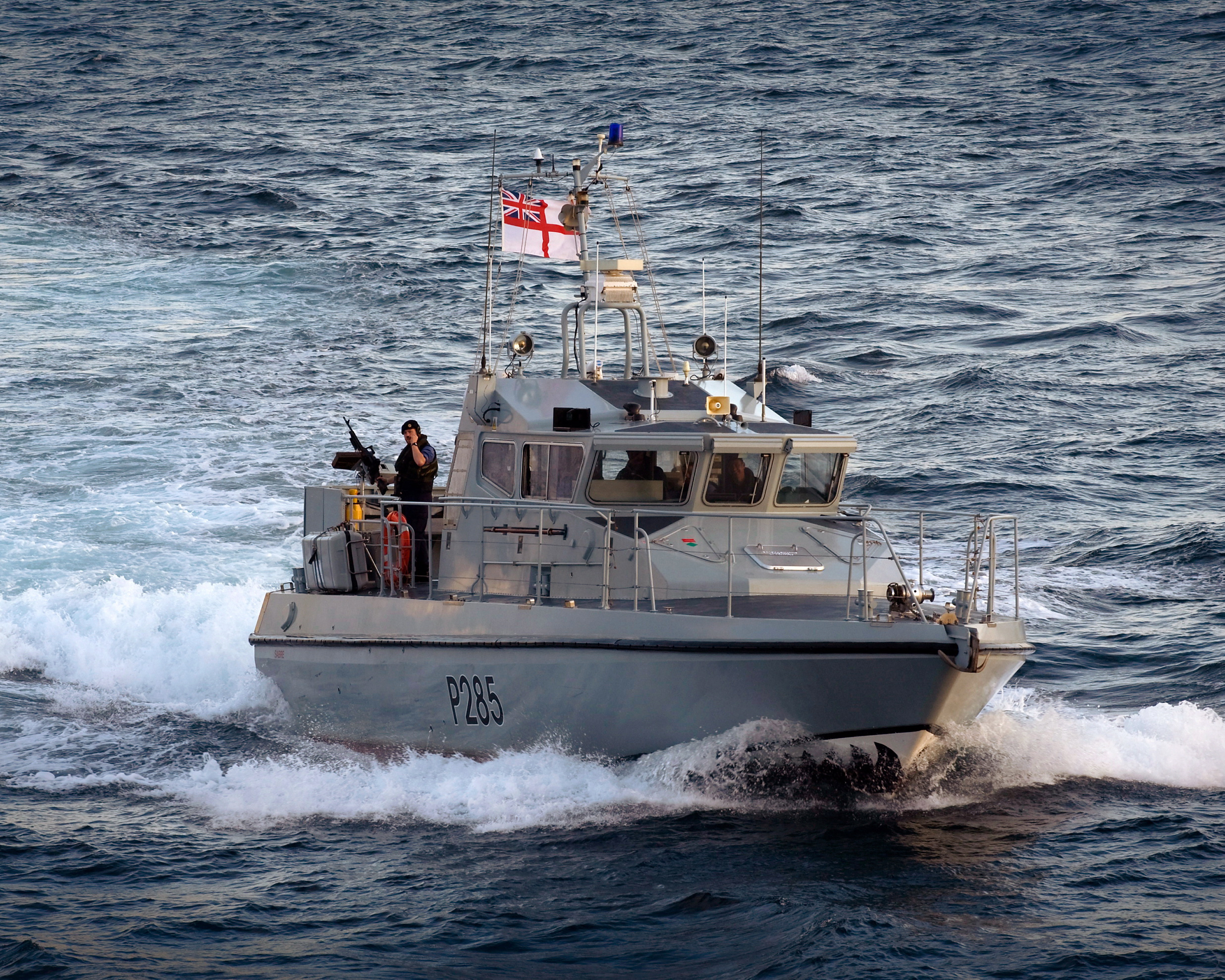
- HMS Sabre off Gibraltar in 2011

History

United Kingdom
- Name: LPV Grey Wolf
- Operator: Royal Marines
- Builder: VT Halmatic, Southampton
- Commissioned: January 1993
- Out of service: September 2002
- Home port: Lough Neagh, Northern Ireland
- Identification: MMSI number: 235067941; Callsign: GWBY
- Fate: Transferred to Royal Navy

United Kingdom
- Name: HMS Sabre
- Operator: Royal Navy
- Acquired: September 2002
- Commissioned: 31 January 2003
- Decommissioned: 30 March 2022
- Home port: Gibraltar
- Identification: MMSI number: 235067941; Callsign: GWBY; Pennant number: P285
- Status: Awaiting Disposal

General characteristics
- Class & type: Scimitar-class patrol vessel
- Displacement: 24 t (24 long tons)
- Length: 16 m (52 ft 6 in)
- Beam: 3.1 m (10 ft 2 in)
- Draught: 1.2 m (3 ft 11 in)
- Propulsion: 2 × MAN 2480LXE diesels, 2 shafts
- Speed: 32 knots (59 km/h; 37 mph)
- Range: 260 nmi (480 km; 300 mi) at 19 knots (35 km/h; 22 mph)
- Complement: 5 (1 officer, 4 ratings)
- Sensors & processing systems: Racal-Decca Bridgemaster 360, I band navigation radar
- Armament: 2 × General purpose machine guns (stern-mounted)

HMS Sabre was a Scimitar-class fast patrol boat of the British Royal Navy. She was commissioned into the Gibraltar Squadron on 31 January 2003 along with her sister Scimitar, and used for police, customs and rescue purposes. The two boats allowed the two Archer-class patrol vessel of the squadron, Trumpeter and Ranger, to be reassigned to the Cyprus Squadron in April 2003 and April 2004 respectively.

== Operational history ==
=== LPV Grey Wolf ===
The vessel had previously been operated alongside her sister ship Grey Fox as part of Operation Lifespan in Northern Ireland since 1993 as LPV (Lough Patrol Vessel) Grey Wolf both vessels were based in their own special dock at Massereene barracks with access to 6 Mile Water in Lough Neagh, Northern Ireland where she was commanded and crewed by seven Royal Marines and two Royal Navy personnel conducting maritime counter terrorism, surveillance, intelligence and anti-smuggling operations. The crew included a four-person team of Royal Marines to conduct boarding and ground operations the vessels would normally tow a 22 ft (6.7 m) Arctic rigid inflatable boat (RIB) used to deploy this team.

=== HMS Sabre ===
On 10 April 2009 a vessel from Spain's Civil Guard Police force entered Gibraltar territorial waters unannounced and approached the area near Gibraltar's airport. HMS Sabre approached, and there was no response from the Spanish vessel. It was warned to leave the territorial waters, and after consulting with its superiors it did so. However, accounts vary between the Royal Navy and the Spanish versions. The Royal Navy states that its guns were loaded at the time, however the Spanish accounts state that the guns were specifically pointed at the Spanish vessel. In addition, Spanish MP Jose Ignacio Landaluce from the People's Party vowed to take up the issue in parliament. He said Spain "would not allow a Civil Guard vessel to be expelled from its own home".

In May 2016 Spain's Civil Guard Police force vessel Rio Cedena twice tried to cut across the path of the submarine USS Florida in Gibraltar territorial waters. HMS Sabre fired warning flares to deter the Spanish vessel.

=== Replacement ===
In July 2017 it was revealed that the Gibraltar Squadron would receive two new warships which will be more "capable", "faster" and have "bigger guns", to replace Sabre and Scimitar "within the next two years".

On 24 July 2020, an announcement was made that the promised two new warships had been ordered from Marine Specialised Technology (MST Ltd) with the first to be delivered in Q3 2021/22 and the second in Q1 2022/2023. The contract is expected to cost at least £9.9 million. The patrol vessel replacements are initially going to be armed with X3 General Purpose Machine Guns (one on the foredeck and two on the aft deck) as well as being fitted for but not with a 0.50 cal Heavy Machine Gun. The ships are going to be 19 m (62 ft) long, carry six crew and six passengers and travel at 40 knots (74 km/h; 46 mph).

In September 2020 Sabre, along with her sister ship Scimitar, returned to Portsmouth aboard MV Anvil Point having been replaced temporarily by HMS Dasher and HMS Pursuer before their long-term replacements arrive.

After operating in UK waters for a period, Sabre and Scimitar were decommissioned in a joint ceremony at Portsmouth Naval Base on 30 March 2022.
