= HMS Scimitar (P284) =

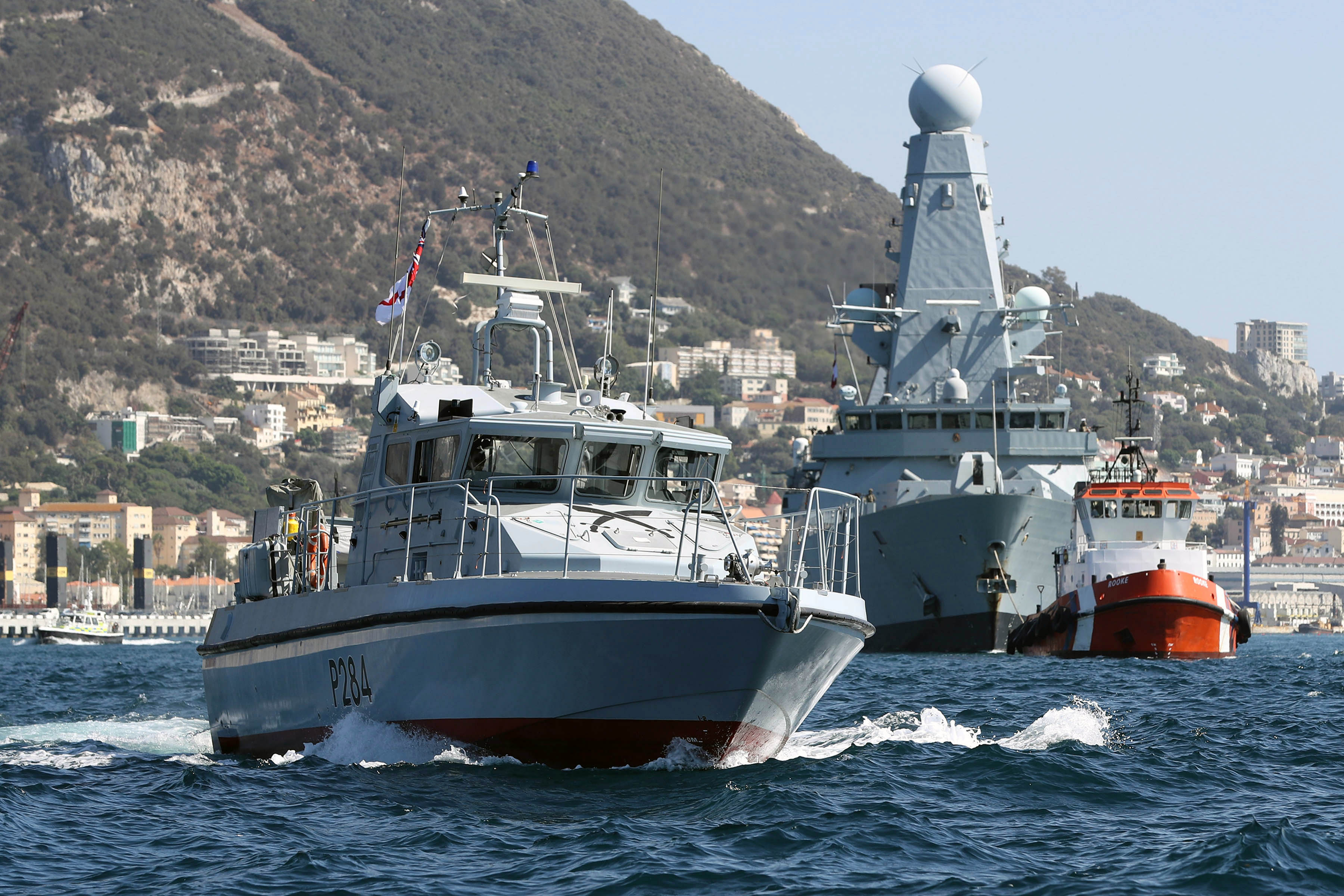
- HMS Scimitar off Gibraltar with Type 45 Destroyer HMS Daring in 2016

History

United Kingdom
- Name: HMS Scimitar
- Builder: Halmatic Ltd, Portsmouth
- Launched: December 1992
- Commissioned: 2003
- Decommissioned: 30 March 2022
- Identification: Pennant number: P284; MMSI number: 232002929; Callsign: GWBX
- Status: Awaiting disposal

General characteristics
- Class & type: Scimitar-class patrol vessel
- Displacement: 24 tonnes (24 long tons)
- Length: 16 m (52 ft 6 in)
- Beam: 3.1 m (10 ft 2 in)
- Draught: 1.2 m (3 ft 11 in)
- Propulsion: 2 × MAN 2480LXE diesels, 2 shafts
- Speed: 32 knots (37 mph; 59 km/h)
- Range: 260 nmi (480 km) at 19 kn (35 km/h)
- Complement: 7 (1 officer, 6 ratings)
- Sensors & processing systems: Racal-Decca Bridgemaster 360, I band navigation radar
- Armament: 2 × General purpose machine guns (stern-mounted)

HMS Scimitar was a Scimitar-class fast patrol boat of the British Royal Navy. She is a Lifespan Patrol Vessel type boat and formerly served in inland waterway duties in Northern Ireland as MV Grey Fox. She was acquired to serve with the Gibraltar Squadron, tasked with policing, customs and search and rescue duties. This released an Archer-class patrol vessel for tasking with the Cyprus Squadron.

== Operational history ==
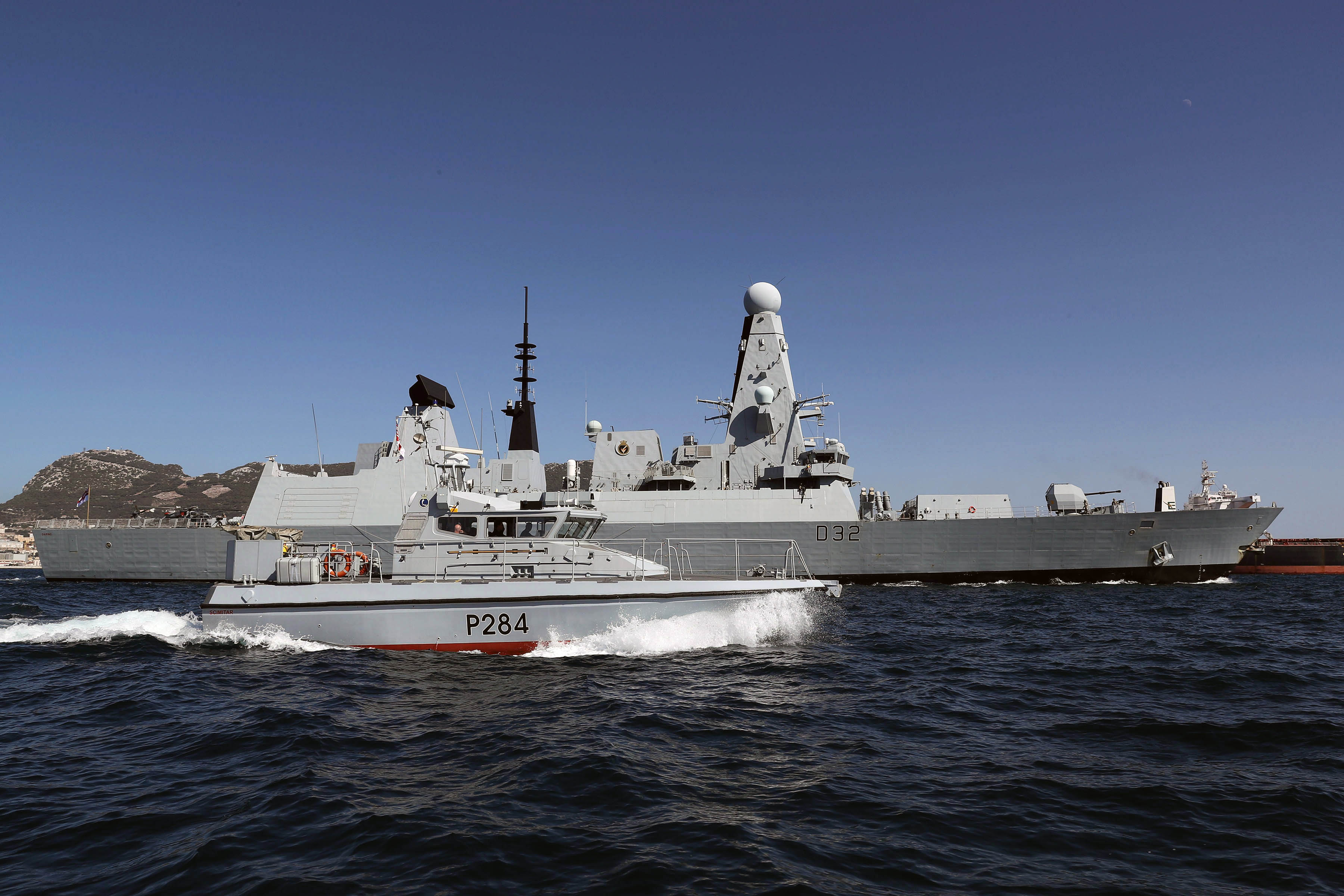
Scimitar escorts HMS Daring into Gibraltar in 2016

Scimitar was involved in a diplomatic incident between the United Kingdom and Spain in November 2009 after being alleged by the Spanish to have been using the Spanish flag as a target during gunnery practice. The Ministry of Defence stated that the ship had actually been shooting at a NATO maritime signal flag, which is similar in appearance.

On 3 May 2011 Scimitar was dispatched to intercept the Spanish Serviola-class patrol boat Atalaya when she entered British waters around Gibraltar and ordered the Spanish ship to leave the area. Scimitar took part in another encounter with a Spanish naval vessel on 4 April 2017. It challenged Infanta Cristina, a Descubierta-class corvette that had entered British waters off of Gibraltar. Infanta Cristina left without further incident.

On 8 November 2017, HMS Scimitar intercepted the Spanish corvette Infanta Elena trying to enter British territorial waters off Gibraltar.

=== Replacement ===
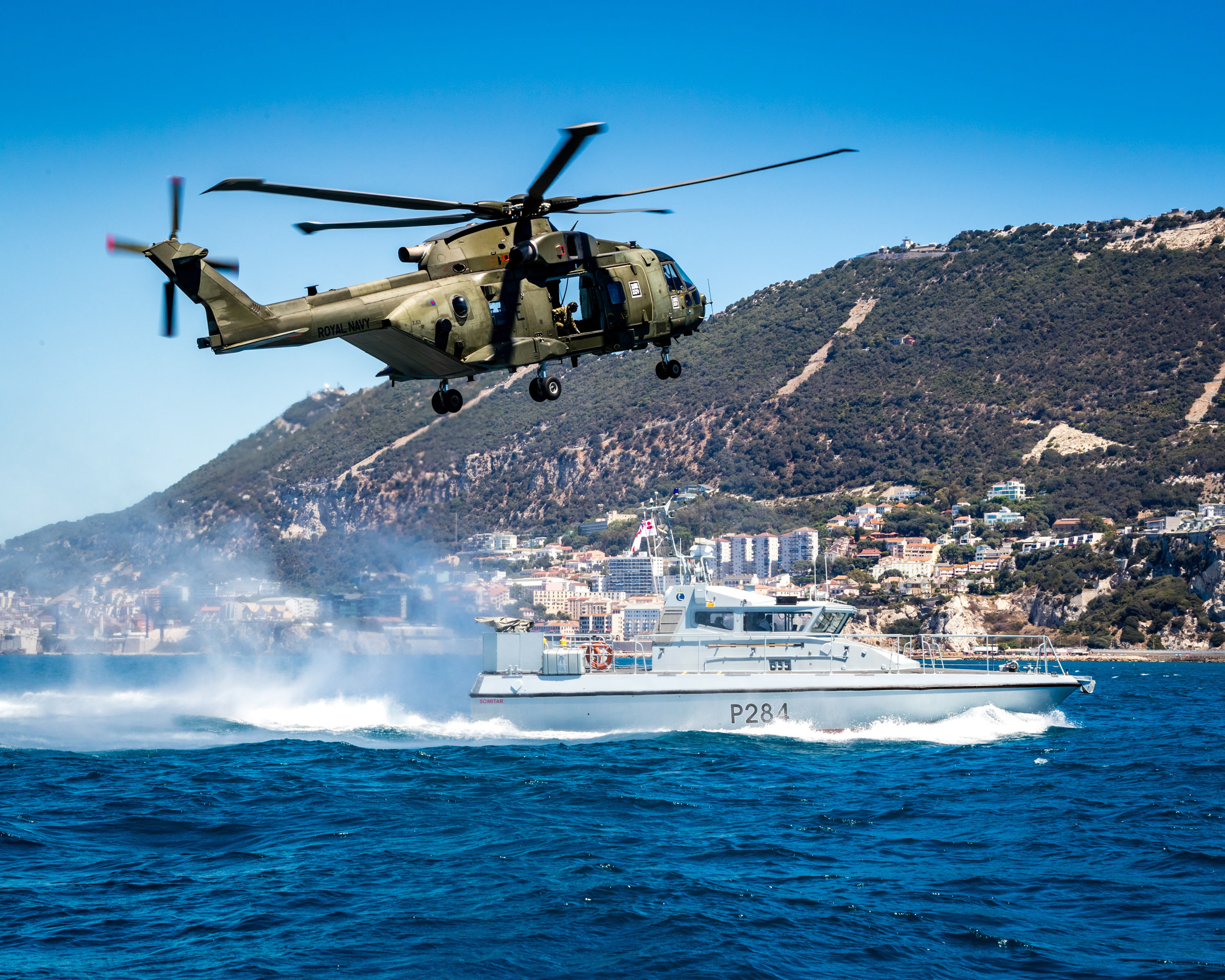
Scimitar with Merlin HC3 of 846 NAS off Gibraltar

In July 2017 it was revealed that the Gibraltar Squadron would receive two new warships which will be more "capable", "faster" and have "bigger guns", to replace Sabre and Scimitar "within the next two years".

On 24 July 2020, an announcement was made that the promised two new warships have been ordered from Marine Specialised Technology (MST Ltd) with the first to be delivered in (Q3 2021/22) and the second in (Q1 2022/2023). The contract is expected to cost at least £9.9 million. The patrol vessel replacements are initially going to be armed with X3 General Purpose Machine Guns (1 on the foredeck and 2 on the aft deck) as well as being fitted for but not with a 0.50 cal Heavy Machine Gun. The ships are going to be 19 m (62 ft 4 in) long, carry 6 crew and 6 passengers and travel at 40 knots (74 km/h; 46 mph).

In September 2020 Scimitar, along with her sister ship Sabre, returned to Portsmouth aboard MV Anvil Point having been replaced temporarily by HMS Dasher and HMS Pursuer.

After a period operating in UK waters Scimitar and Sabre were decommissioned in a joint ceremony at Portsmouth Naval Base on 30 March 2022.

In 2024 it was reported that the former HMS Scimitar had been converted to medical vessel, MV Lady Jean, and was transported to Tanzania to serve as a medical vessel supporting remote island communities on Lake Victoria.
