= Scimitar-class patrol vessel =

British naval ship class (2003–2022)

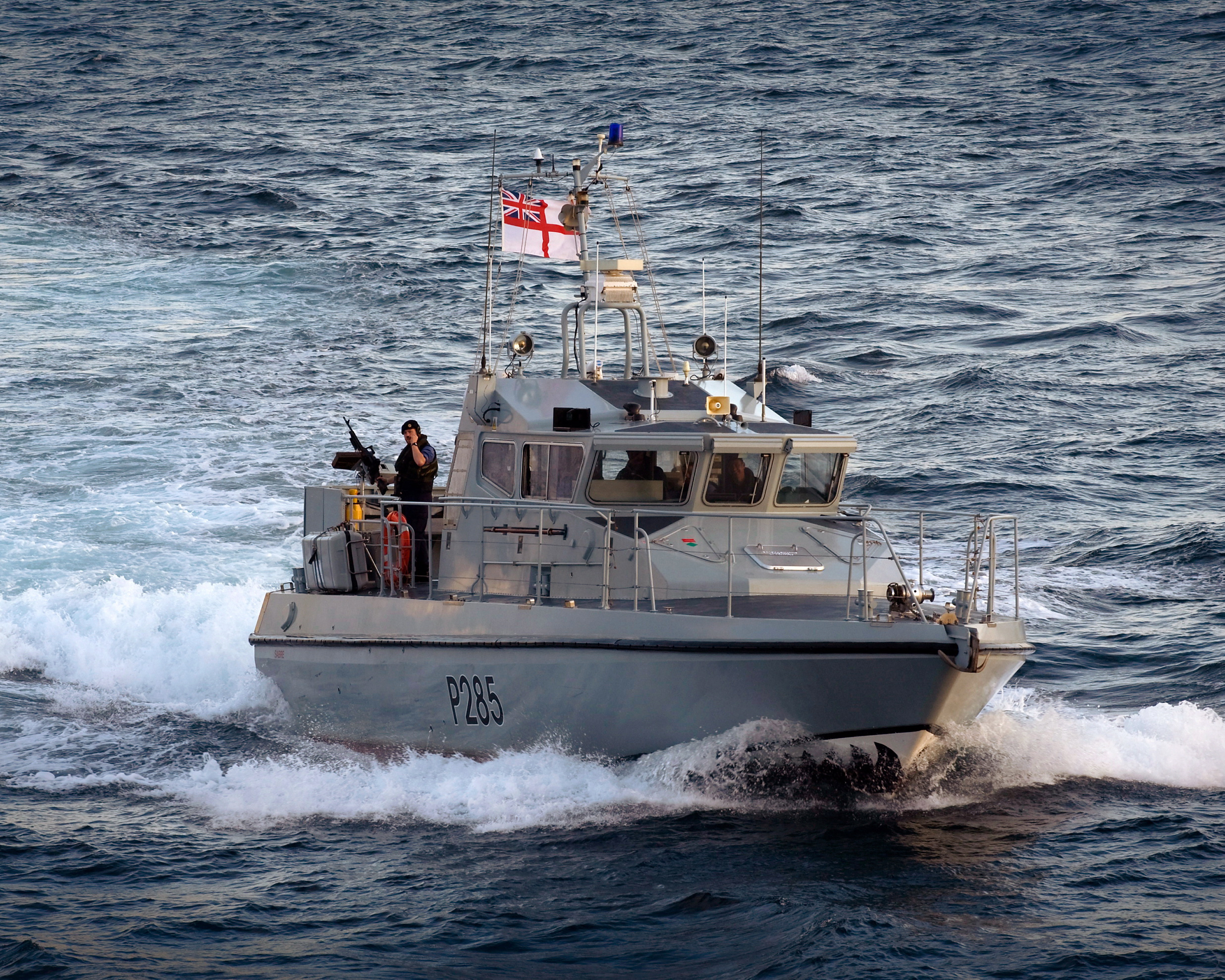
- HMS Sabre, 2011

Class overview
- Builders: Halmatic
- Operators: Royal Navy
- Preceded by: Archer class
- Succeeded by: Cutlass class
- In commission: 2003–2022
- Retired: 2

General characteristics
- Type: Patrol boat
- Displacement: 24 tonnes (24 long tons)
- Length: 16 m (52 ft 6 in)
- Beam: 3.1 m (10 ft 2 in)
- Draught: 1.2 m (3 ft 11 in)
- Propulsion: 2 × MAN 2480LXE diesels, 2 shafts
- Speed: 32 knots (59 km/h; 37 mph)
- Range: 260 nmi (480 km; 300 mi) at 19 kn (35 km/h; 22 mph)
- Complement: 5 (1 officer, 4 ratings)
- Sensors & processing systems: Racal-Decca Bridgemaster 360, I band navigation radar
- Armament: 2 × General purpose machine guns (stern-mounted)

The Scimitar class were a class of fast patrol boat formerly in service with the British Royal Navy.

The two vessels of this class were of a commercial design known as the Lifespan Patrol Vessel built by Halmatic (now BAE Systems Surface Ships), and formerly served in an inshore waterways anti-terrorist role in Northern Ireland. They were acquired for the Royal Navy in 2003 for service with the Gibraltar Squadron, releasing two Archer-class boats that had filled this role for service with the Cyprus Squadron.

With the decommissioning of the survey launch HMS Gleaner in February 2018, the two Scimitar-class boats became the smallest commissioned vessels in the Royal Navy. The two vessels were returned to the U.K. from Gibraltar in 2020, having been replaced there by two Archer-class boats, but were reported as still operational in Portsmouth at the end of 2020. Both vessels were decommissioned in a joint ceremony at Portsmouth Naval Base on 30 March 2022.

== Vessels in the class ==
Name	Pennant number	Builder	Commissioned	Decommissioned	Status
Scimitar (ex-MV Grey Fox)	P284	Halmatic Ltd, Portsmouth	31 January 2003	30 March 2022	Converted to medical vessel, MV Lady Jean
Sabre (ex-MV Grey Wolf)	P285	Halmatic Ltd, Southampton	31 January 2003	30 March 2022	Awaiting disposal

== See also ==
- Cutlass-class patrol vessel
