= BAE Systems Maritime – Maritime Services =

Subsidiary company of BAE Systems

BAE Systems Maritime Services
- Type: Private
- Industry: Defence; Marine engineering Manufacturing
- Predecessor: BAE Systems Insyte; Fleet Support Limited
- Founded: 2012
- Headquarters: Portsmouth, United Kingdom
- Products: Artisan 3D Radar; Pacific 24 RIB; Spearfish Torpedo
- Number of employees: ~3500
- Parent: BAE Systems Surface Ships Limited
- Website: www.baesystems.com

BAE Systems Maritime – Maritime Services is a wholly owned subsidiary company of BAE Systems, specialising in the repair and maintenance of Royal Navy vessels, as well as product development, naval training and through life support for radar, torpedoes and small boats. Along with BAE Systems Maritime – Submarines and BAE Systems Maritime – Naval Ships, it is one of three divisions of BAE Systems Maritime.

== History ==
Maritime Services was originally formed as Fleet Support Limited (FSL), a joint venture between GEC-Marconi and Vosper Thornycroft (now VT Group). GEC's 50% share passed to its successor BAE Systems in 1999. In July 2008 BAE Systems and VT Group merged their military ship repair businesses to form BVT Surface Fleet. In 2009 the company was renamed BAE Systems Surface Ships Support Limited, with complete ownership passing to BAE Systems. In January 2012, BAE Systems Surface Ships Support was restructured, joining with parts of BAE Systems Insyte to become BAE Systems Maritime – Maritime Services.

== Products and services ==
=== Engineering Services ===
Maritime Services has an Engineering Services division which provides services including support engineering, design services and energy solutions. Its Energy team worked with the Royal Navy to construct a Combined Heat and Power plant in Portsmouth Naval Base, which provides low carbon power for naval vessels.

=== Manufacturing ===
Maritime Services carries out advanced manufacturing operations at Broad Oak in Portsmouth, Cowes on the Isle of Wight, Great Baddow in Essex and Hillend in Fife. It develops, tests, assembles and integrates a wide range of technologies for both commercial and military electronics markets, including missile seekers and avionics equipment

=== Naval Base Services ===
Maritime Services manages Portsmouth Naval Base as part of KBS Maritime, a joint venture with KBR. It provides services such as strategic estate management, infrastructure programme delivery and the provision of operations, maintenance and alongside services.

=== Radar ===
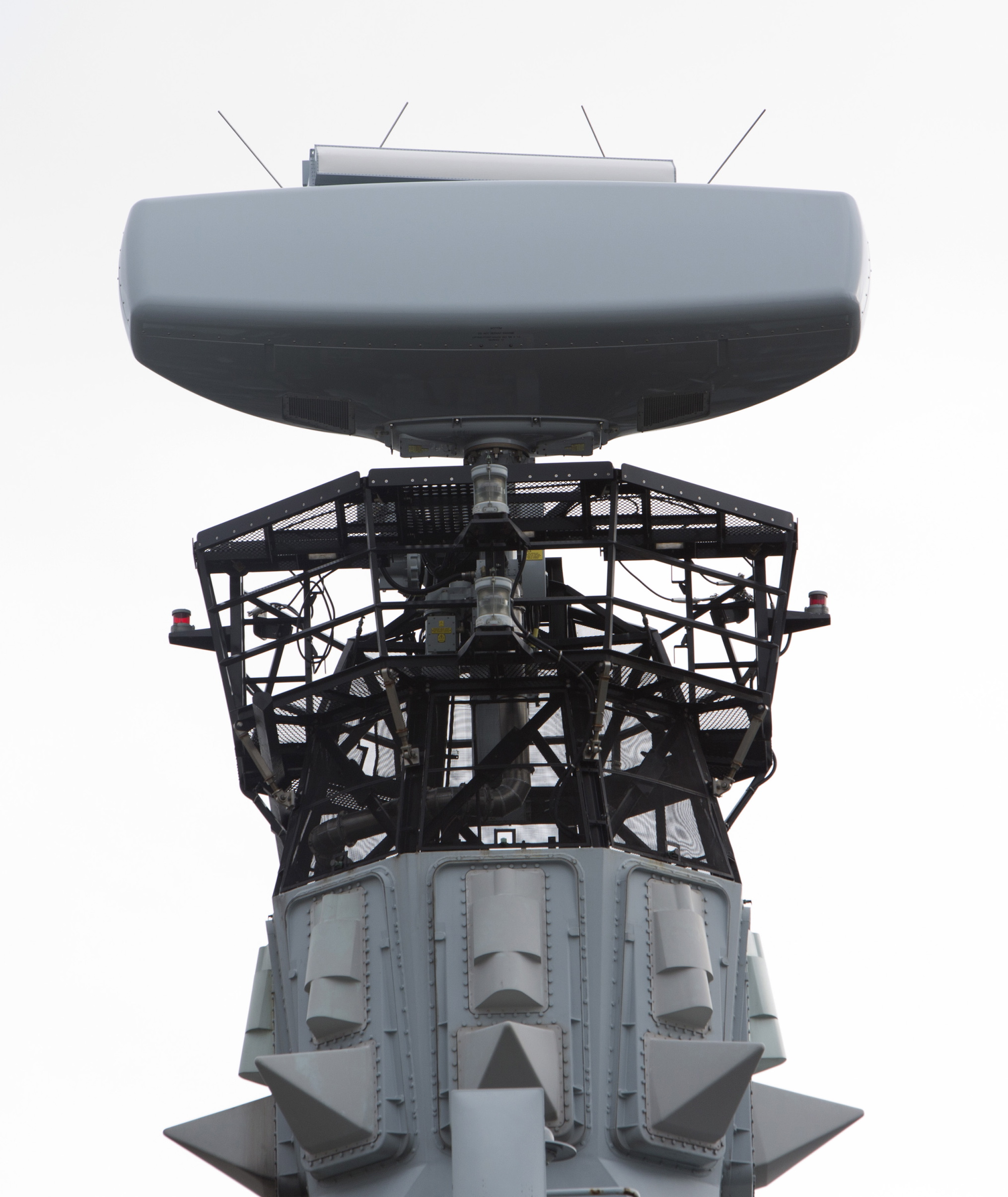
Artisan Type 997 Radar installed on HMS Argyll

Maritime Services has developed radars for both the Royal Navy and other customers. Principal products include several variants of the Type 997 Artisan radar, the SAMPSON radar and the Commander SL Long Range Tactical Air Defence Radar. In November 2017, Maritime Services was awarded a five-year, £18m contract to support the long-range radar equipment on the UK's six Type 45 destroyers. In June 2023, it was awarded a ten year contract to support the three main radar systems used across the Royal Navy Fleet and to develop the next generation of radar technology.

=== Small Boats ===
Maritime Services manufactures and supports a range of specialist high-speed military craft, including Rigid Inflatable Boats and Fast Attack Craft. These boats are used by Special Forces, navies, armies, air forces and governments in over 40 countries around the world. Principal products include the Pacific 24 and Pacific 950 Rigid Inflatable Boats, as well as a Littoral Strike Craft concept that reflects the company’s evolving thinking on the UK’s planned Commando Insertion Craft requirement.

=== Training ===
Maritime Services provides a range of shore-based training facilities, using a mix of computer-based training, real equipment and high-fidelity simulators, which minimise the need for on-board training. Principal training facilities include the Maritime Composite Training Facility (MCTS) and the Astute Class Training Service (ACTS).

=== Underwater Weapons ===
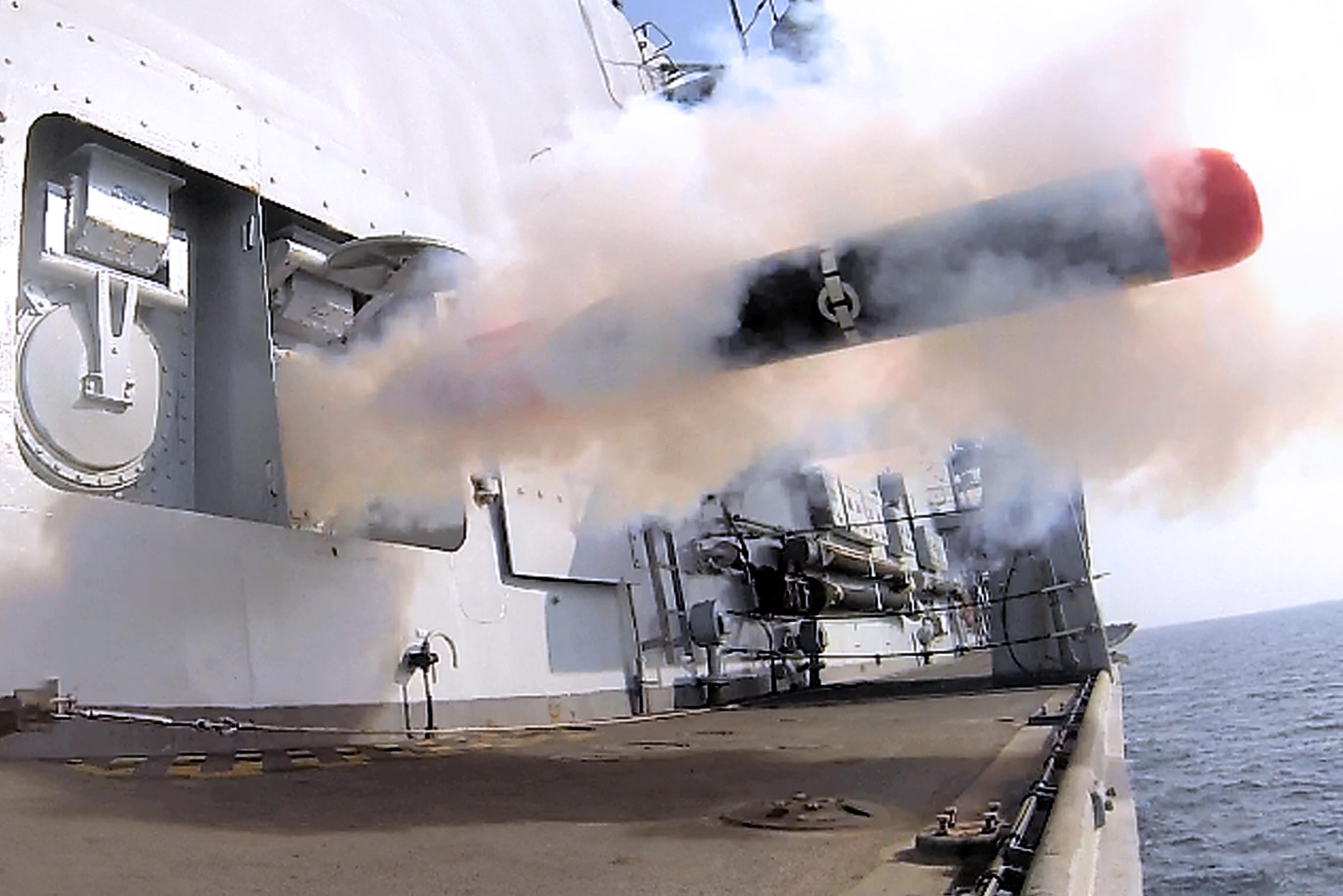
Sting Ray Torpedo (Training Variant) being fired by HMS Westminster

Maritime Services designs, manufactures and supports a wide range of underwater weapons and autonomous underwater vehicles, including Spearfish heavyweight torpedoes, Stingray lightweight torpedoes, Herne Extra Large Unmanned Underwater Vehicles and Archerfish expendable mine neutralisers. Currently, Maritime Services is undertaking a £270 million programme to upgrade the Spearfish torpedo. The upgrade includes a new insensitive-munition warhead from TDW, a change to the fuel system to improve safety, full digitisation of the weapon and a new fibre optic guidance link to improve performance. The upgraded torpedoes will enter operational service onboard all Royal Navy submarines by 2025. Following the upgrade of the Spearfish Heavyweight torpedo, Maritime Services will upgrade the Sting Ray lightweight torpedo.

=== Warship Support ===
Maritime Services is responsible for delivering end to end services and support to over 50% of the Royal Navy's surface fleet. Ships supported include the Type 45 destroyers, Type 23 frigates, Hunt-class mine countermeasures vessels, River-class offshore patrol vessels and Queen Elizabeth-class aircraft carriers. Maritime Services is part of an alliance with Cammell Laird and consultancy firm BMT that is contracted to resolve ongoing Type 45 power generation issues caused by unreliable Northrop Grumman intercoolers. In 2022, it signed an agreement with Qatar's Barzan Maintenance Shield to work together to deliver Warship Support and Naval Base Management Services for the Qatar Emiri Naval Force.
