= Fleet Support Limited =

British logistics company

BAE Systems Surface Ships Support Limited
- Company type: Private
- Industry: Marine engineering Logistics management
- Founded: June 1996 (as Fleet Support Limited)
- Headquarters: Portsmouth, United Kingdom
- Parent: GEC Marconi/Vosper Thornycroft (1996–1999); BAE Systems/VT Group (1999–2008); BVT Surface Fleet (2008–2009); BAE Systems Surface Ships (2009–2011); BAE Systems Maritime - Maritime Services (2012–)
- Website: www.fleet-support.co.uk

Fleet Support Limited (FSL) is a British company formed to run HMNB Portsmouth's Fleet Maintenance and Repair Organisation (FMRO) on a commercial basis. The FMRO was an agency of the Ministry of Defence responsible for repair and maintenance of Royal Navy vessels. FSL performs this task but also undertakes commercial work such as shiprepair, refitting, conversion and hull fabrication. FSL also carries out heavy engineering work and nondestructive testing for the marine and engineering sectors.

== History ==
FSL was founded as a joint venture between Vosper Thornycroft (now VT Group) and GEC-Marconi. GEC's 50% share passed to its successor BAE Systems in 1999. In July 2008 BAE Systems and VT Group merged their military shipbuilding businesses to form BVT Surface Fleet. This included FSL, which was rebranded as BVT Surface Fleet Support Limited. In 2009 this became BAE Systems Surface Ships, with complete ownership passing to BAE Systems and the company being renamed BAE Systems Surface Ships Support Limited. In January 2012, BAE Systems Surface Ships Support was restructured, joining with parts of Insyte to become BAE Systems Maritime - Maritime Services.

A Biber German World War II midget submarine on display at the Royal Navy Submarine Museum was restored to working condition by apprentices from Fleet Support Limited on a sandwich course in 2003 under the guidance of Ian Clark. The restoration featured on Channel 4's salvage squad.
