= Archerfish expendable mine neutraliser =

Sea mine destroyer

Archerfish is a remote-controlled underwater mine neutraliser that is manufactured by BAE Systems Maritime Services. Archerfish uses sonar and video to find sea mines, then fires a warhead with a shaped charge to destroy them, reducing the need for human beings to enter minefields.

== Service history ==
Archerfish is currently in service with the US Navy. In 2023, South Korea became the second country to operate Archerfish when Korea Aerospace Industries awarded BAE Systems a contract to provide a complete mine countermeasure capability, which will form part of the Republic of Korea Navy’s new anti-mine helicopter fleet.
