= BAE Systems Maritime – Naval Ships =

Subsidiary company of BAE Systems

- Type: Private
- Industry: Defence; Shipbuilding; Marine engineering
- Predecessor: BAE Systems Surface Fleet Solutions; VT Shipbuilding
- Founded: 1 July 2008 (as BVT Surface Fleet)
- Headquarters: Glasgow, Scotland, UK
- Key people: Sir John Parker – Chairman (2008–2009); Alan Johnston CBE – CEO (2008–2011); Iain Stevenson – managing director (2016–2019)/> Steve Timms - Managing Director (2019–2021)/> Sir Simon Lister - Managing Director (2021–Present) Heather Lee- HR director (2018–present)Engineering Director Paul Feely(2016–Present) Shipbuild Director David Goodfellow (2003–2011)
- Products: Naval vessels
- Services: Ship design Ship support
- Revenue: £1.12 Billion (FY 2008/09)
- Operating income: £45 Million
- Total assets: £352 Million
- Number of employees: Approximately 7,000
- Parent: BAE Systems Maritime
- Website: www.baesystems.com

BAE Systems Maritime – Naval Ships is a wholly owned subsidiary company of BAE Systems, specialising in naval surface shipbuilding and combat systems integration. One of three divisions of BAE Systems Maritime, along with BAE Systems Submarines and BAE Systems Maritime – Maritime Services, it is the largest shipbuilding company in the United Kingdom, one of the largest shipbuilders in Europe, and one of the world's largest builders of complex warships.

It was originally formed as a joint stock subsidiary on 1 July 2008, with the merger of BAE Systems Surface Fleet Solutions and VT Shipbuilding, creating a new firm named BVT Surface Fleet.

The new firm incorporated the BAE Systems Surface Fleet Solutions operated shipyards at Scotstoun and Govan on the River Clyde in Glasgow and the VT Shipbuilding facilities within the Naval Base at Portsmouth.

BAE Systems subsequently acquired VT Group's share of the joint venture on 30 October 2009 and renamed the business BAE Systems Surface Ships Ltd.

On 1 January 2011, BAE Systems Surface Ships was operationally integrated with BAE Systems Submarine Solutions to form BAE Systems Maritime. On 1 January 2012, BAE Systems Surface Ships was formally restructured and rebranded as BAE Systems Maritime – Naval Ships and BAE Systems Maritime – Maritime Services, the former incorporating the shipbuilding operations and combat systems development and the latter in-service support.

== History ==
=== Defence Industrial Strategy ===
The Ministry of Defence's (MOD) 2005 Defence Industrial Strategy encouraged BAE and VT Group to form a naval shipbuilding joint venture with the aim of maintaining the UK's naval shipbuilding capability in the long-term. In return, in July 2007 the MoD guaranteed the new company a certain amount of work for 15 years, or to pay penalties instead. The Terms of Business Agreement (ToBA) finally signed in July 2009 promised a minimum level of ship build and support activity of around £230 million/year to sustain a warship industry in the UK. The government could cancel the deal at any time, subject to penalties which would decline over the course of the agreement but which would have been £630m at the time of the 2010 SDSR, in lieu of the MoD's existing liability for rationalisation costs under Yellow Book rules.

Explaining the rationale for the joint venture from VT Group's perspective, its CEO Paul Lester described shipbuilding as a "lumpy" business, dependent on large contracts placed at irregular intervals. Another issue was the competition between VT and BAE: "We don't want to get into a dogfight with BAE over who would be the survivor... That's what you'd be talking about at some stage."

BAE and VT concluded the merger discussions in early 2008, however creation of BVT Surface Fleet was conditional on the signing of contracts for the Queen Elizabeth-class aircraft carriers. Following the Ministry of Defence's announcement on 20 May 2008 that it intended to proceed with the manufacturing stage of the project, BAE announced its intention to finalise the joint venture arrangements with VT Group. This was completed on 11 June 2008 and, following VT Group shareholder approval on 30 June, the joint venture became operational on 1 July.

The logo of the former BVT joint venture from July 2008 to September 2009, when BAE Systems bought VT Group's share of the joint venture.

BAE Systems and VT Group owned 55% and 45% of the company respectively, however they had equal board representation and voting rights.

In return, VT Group acquired BAE System's 50% share in their other joint venture company Flagship Training, now known as VT Flagship. BVT Surface Fleet subsumed another BAE/VT joint venture, Fleet Support Limited, a ship repair, maintenance and marine engineering company, based within HMNB Portsmouth.

The new 15-year Terms of Business Agreement with the Ministry of Defence did result in some controversy however. On 30 June 2009, a BVT memo was leaked which suggested that two of the company's three shipyards could be closed following completion of Queen Elizabeth-class carrier construction. In response to the leak, BVT said the memo was "worst-case scenario planning" and that it continues to invest in the future of all its yards. However a MOD spokesman said "[the MOD] had to look at the consequences of reduced demand for navy shipbuilding." No firm decisions will be taken until after the Scottish independence referendum in September 2014 as London has made it clear that it would not buy warships from a foreign shipyard. The preferred plan is to consolidate shipbuilding onto the Govan site and invest £300m in a new covered "frigate factory" to build the Type 26.

=== Locations ===
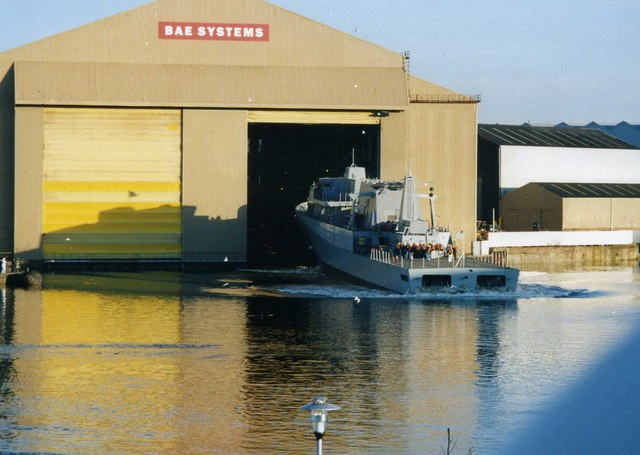
Launch of a Nakhoda Ragam-class corvette from the covered berths at BAE's Scotstoun Shipyard in Glasgow.

BAE Systems Surface Fleet Solutions owns one shipyard on the River Clyde in Glasgow: Scotstoun (formerly Yarrow Shipbuilders) and runs the second Govan (formerly Kvaerner Govan, Govan Shipbuilders, Upper Clyde Shipbuilders and Fairfields), shipyard that have a corporate heritage extending back as far as 1834. VT Shipbuilding (formerly Vosper Thornycroft) owned shipbuilding facilities completed in 2003 within HMNB Portsmouth and a boatyard, VT Halmatic, in Portchester. These facilities were transferred to BVT Surface Fleet, although the VT Halmatic yard was subsequently sold to Trafalgar Wharf, with the Halmatic Small Boats Centre of Excellence moving to a new facility in Portsmouth Naval Base.

BAE Systems Surface Fleet Solutions also operated an additional project management centre at Filton in Bristol, situated close to key stakeholders at MoD Abbey Wood, which was transferred to BVT.

The BAE Systems Submarines Shipyard at Barrow-in-Furness was not included in the joint venture, although since January 2011 Submarines and Surface Ships were operationally integrated under BAE Systems Maritime.

=== VT Group exit ===
At the time of BVT's creation, VT Group was expected to eventually sell its minority share to BAE Systems through a put option, but not within three years. However, on 28 January 2009 VT Group announced its intention to sell its share. VT Group's put option valued its share at a minimum of £380 million subject to conditions; however it received £346 million after various payments to BAE. In addition, VT Group agreed to pay £43 million compensation to BVT for cost overruns on contracts with Trinidad & Tobago and Oman that BVT had inherited from VT Shipbuilding. VT Group's net proceeds from the sale of its share in BVT to BAE Systems were therefore £303 million.

== Products and services ==
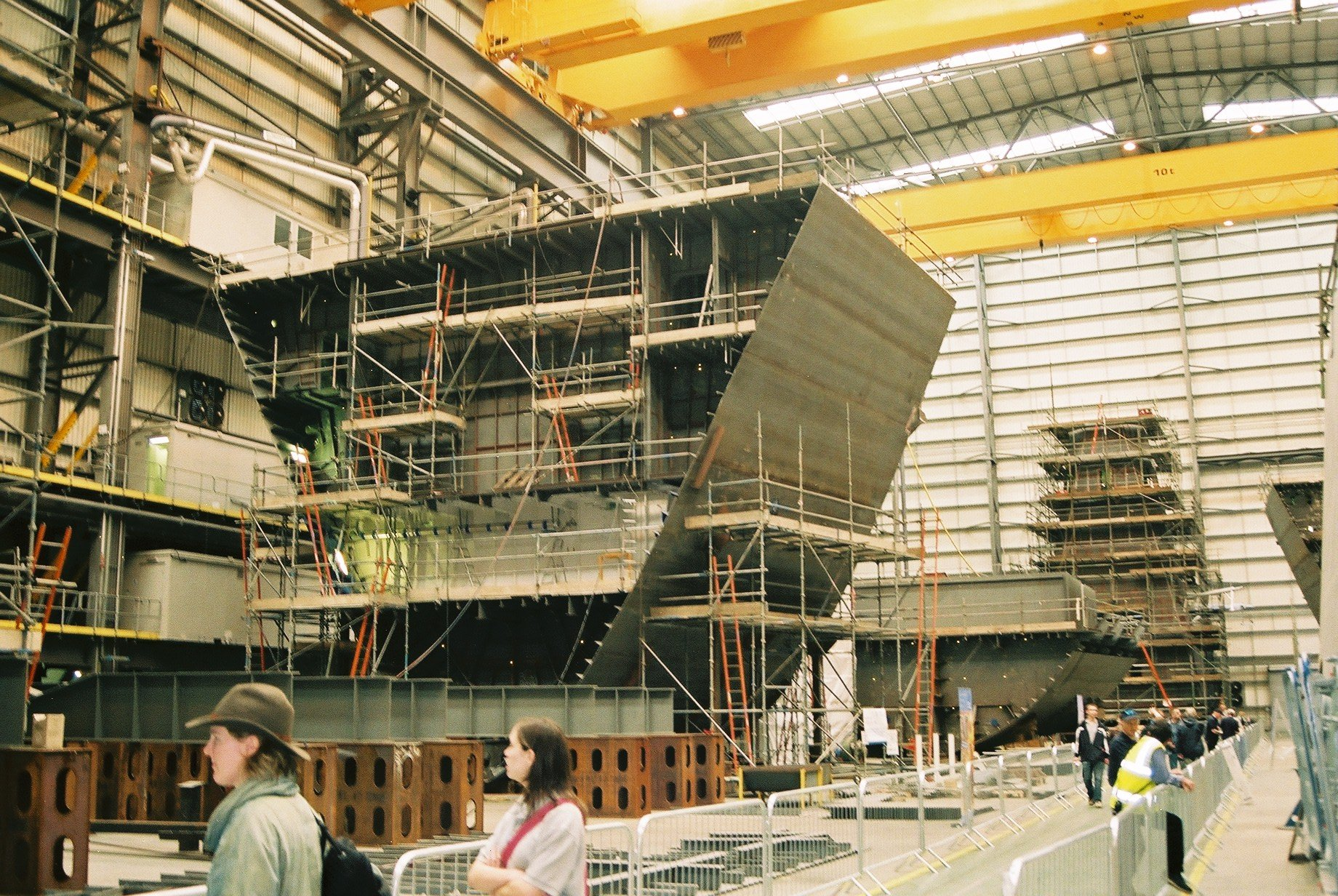
Construction of prefabricated module blocks of Type 45 destroyer, HMS Dauntless, at BAE's Portsmouth Shipbuilding hall.

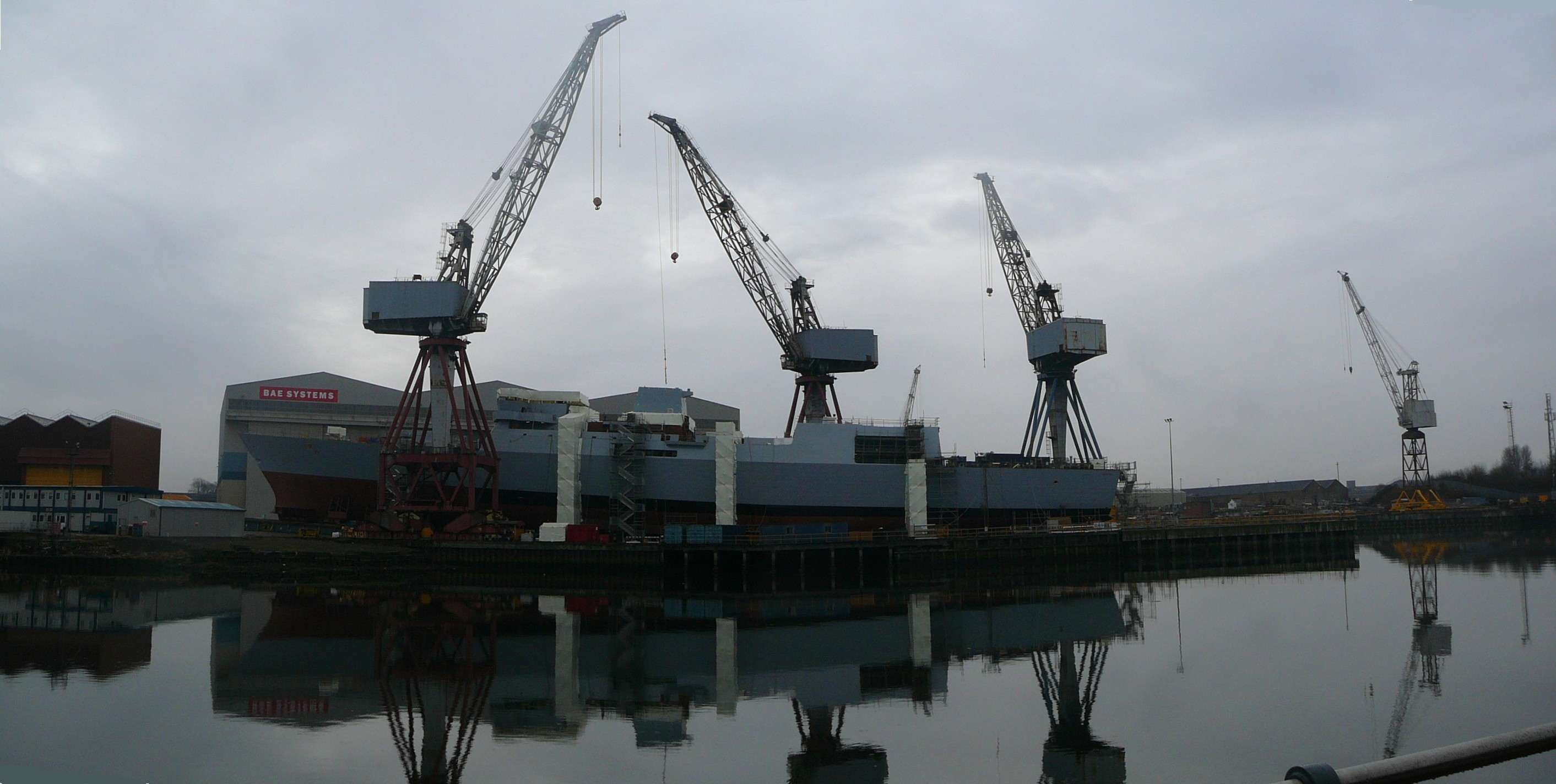
The last of class Type 45 Destroyer hull under final assembly, prior to launch, at the BAE Shipyard in Govan, Glasgow, 2010. The Govan Shipyard is the company's primary facility for steel fabrication.

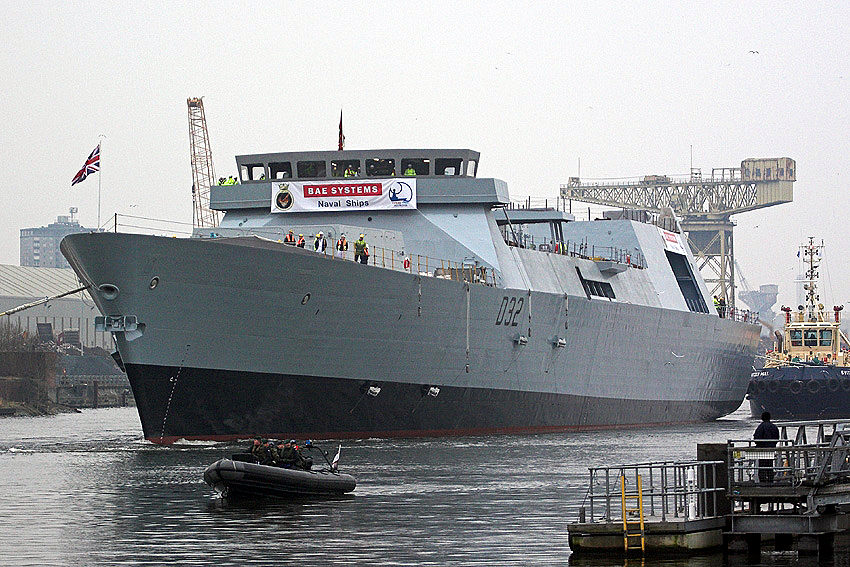
Launch of HMS Daring at Scotstoun in 2006. BAE and VT collaborated on the Type 45 class prior to the creation of the BVT Surface Fleet joint venture in 2008.

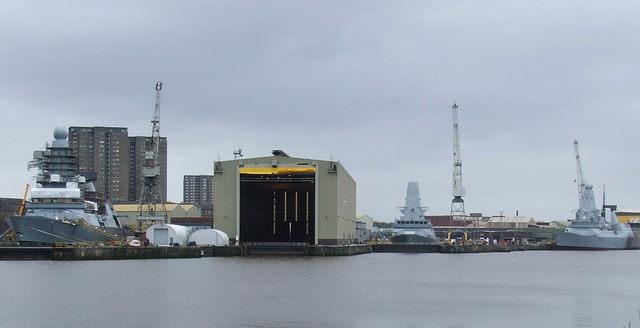
HMS Daring, HMS Dauntless and HMS Diamond fitting out at the Scotstoun Shipyard's dry dock complex in 2008. Scotstoun is the company's primary centre for the outfitting, testing and commissioning of complex warships.

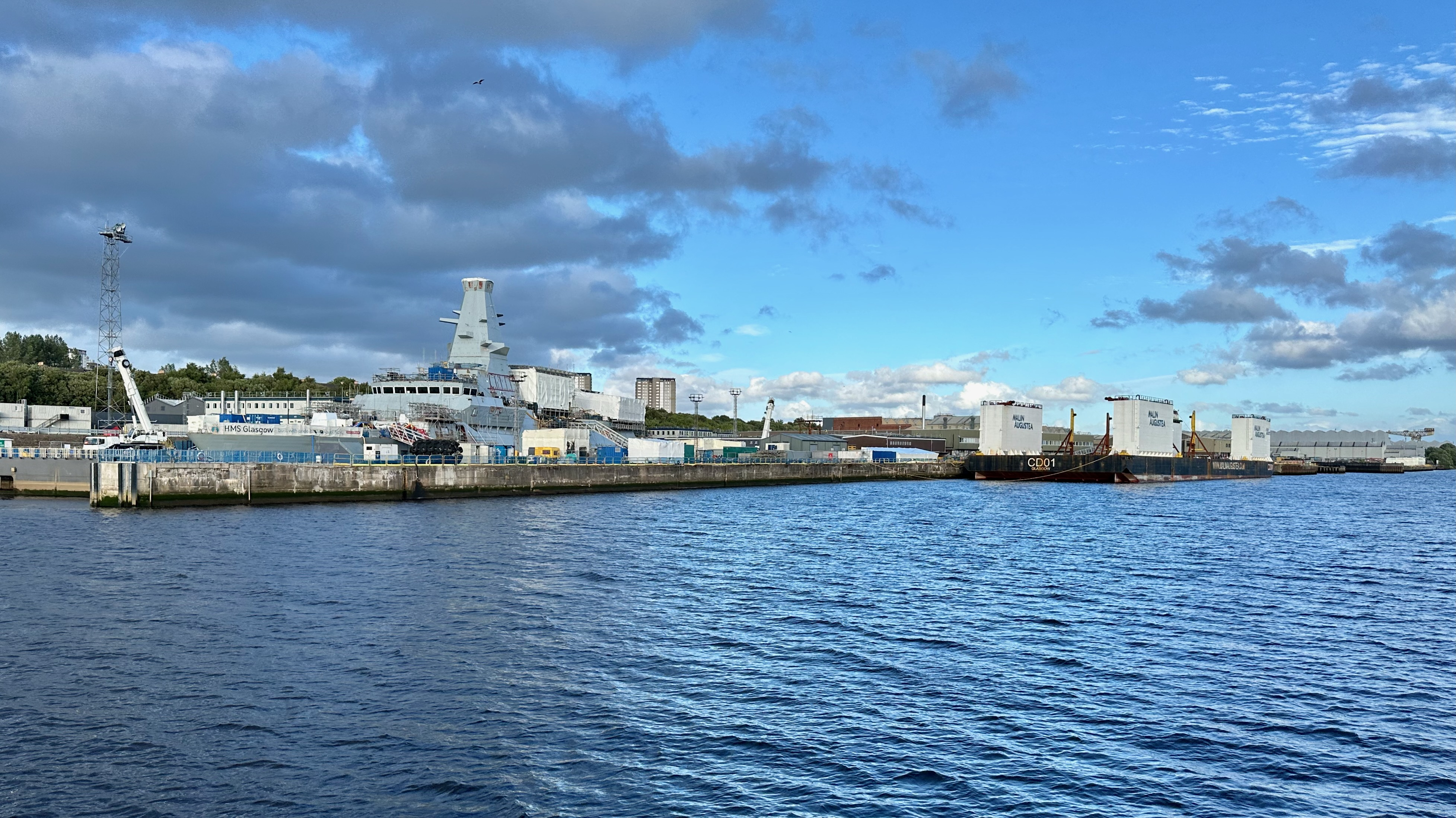
Scotstoun shipyard in 2024, with HMS Glasgow fitting out, and the launch barge Malin Augustea CD01 waiting to transport HMS Cardiff from Govan downriver to Glen Mallan jetty for "float off" launching, before the ship is brought to Scotstoun for fitting out.

=== Aircraft carriers and amphibious assault ships ===
BAE Systems Maritime is undertaking a majority of the workload for the two Queen Elizabeth-class aircraft carriers, the first of which was floated off in July 2014 and is now in commission. As part of the Aircraft Carrier Alliance, Thales and Babcock were also involved in the project. The company's shipyards also constructed large amphibious assault ships, including the Ocean-class LPH, the Albion-class LPD and the Bay-class LSD(A)s.

=== Destroyers ===
BAE's three shipyards all built sections of the Type 45 destroyer, which started as a collaboration between BAE and VT Group. Daring, Dauntless, Diamond, Dragon, Defender and Duncan have all entered service with the Royal Navy. The first of class entered service in May 2009.

In 2007 BAE produced a concept for a UXV Combatant based on a destroyer hull for the operation of unmanned land, air and sea systems.

=== Frigates and corvettes ===
BAE Systems Maritime inherited the £400 million Khareef-class corvette project from VT Group, which SAW three 99 m (324 ft 10 in) ships delivered to the Royal Navy of Oman in 2013–14.

BAE Systems Maritime – Naval Ships' yards have also delivered the following in the recent past:

- Nakhoda Ragam-class corvettes to the Royal Brunei Navy (Indonesian Navy from 2013)
- Qahir-class corvettes to the Royal Navy of Oman
- Lekiu-class frigate for the Royal Malaysian Navy

Construction work is currently underway on the Type 26 frigate project for the Royal Navy, as part of the wider Global Combat Ship programme, which will eventually replace the Type 23 frigates currently in service. Construction of the first of class, HMS Glasgow, started on 20 July 2017 with first steel being cut in the Govan shipyard.

=== Offshore patrol vessels and fast attack craft ===
VT Shipbuilding was responsible for the construction of four River-class patrol vessels for the Royal Navy, with through-life maintenance the ongoing responsibility of BAE Systems Maritime; initially the company leased them to the UK Ministry of Defence until the MoD found the money to buy them. The company completed three Port of Spain-class OPVs based on the Rivers for the Trinidad and Tobago Defence Force in 2010. After the contract was cancelled by the Trinidad & Tobago government in September 2010, these vessels were subsequently contracted for delivery to the Brazilian Navy in January 2012 as the Amazonas class. A technology transfer agreement with Bangkok Dock to build a similar 90 m (295 ft 3 in) OPV, HTMS Krabi, for the Royal Thai Navy was agreed in June 2009. In 2014 the Royal Navy company signed a £348m deal for three improved Rivers to keep the company busy until Type 26 construction began using money that would have been paid to BAE anyway under the ToBA.

BAE Systems Maritime also has a technology transfer agreement in place with Elefsis Shipyards for the construction of the Roussen-class fast attack craft for the Hellenic Navy, which are based on the Barzan (Vita)-class FACs currently in service with the Qatar Armed Forces; itself based upon Vosper Thornycroft's 56 m (183 ft 9 in) patrol craft built for the Royal Navy of Oman and the Kenya Navy.

=== Auxiliaries ===
BAE was initially part of a consortium bidding for the Military Afloat Reach and Sustainability (MARS) programme, which was to see up to six replenishment at sea tankers built for the Royal Fleet Auxiliary. BAE was partnered with BMT Defence Services and Daewoo Shipbuilding & Marine Engineering – the eventual winners – for the project, but subsequently withdrew from the consortium before the final round.

BAE Systems had previously been prime contractor on the Wave-class tanker programme for the Royal Fleet Auxiliary.

=== Halmatic small boats ===
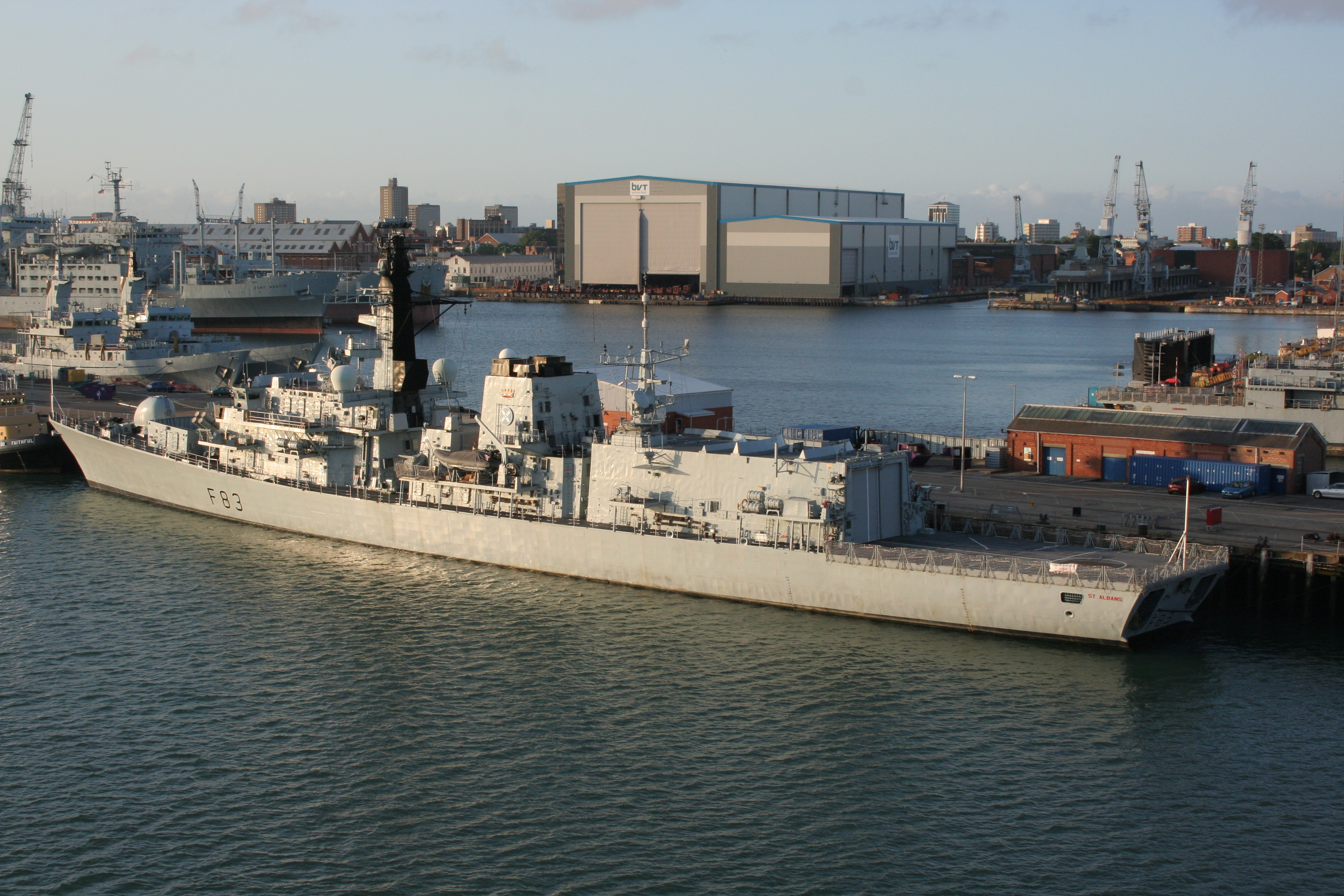
BAE Systems Maritime – Maritime Services operates ship repair and refit facilities within Portsmouth Naval Base.

BAE Systems Maritime – Naval Ships' capabilities also extend to Mine countermeasures vessels (The Sandown class in service with the Royal Navy, Royal Saudi Navy and Estonian Navy), prime contracting on hydrographic survey vessels such as the Echo class, Scott class and the design and production of the smaller Halmatic range of boats such as landing craft, rigid-hulled inflatable boats and rigid buoyant boats. These products include the Lifespan Patrol Vessel, Rigid Raider, Mk 6 Assault Boat and Combat Support Boat types currently in service with the British Armed Forces and other Navies, such as the Jordanian Royal Naval Force and the Republic of Singapore Navy.

=== Support services ===
BAE Systems Maritime's Support services include supply chain management and logistics support. The BAE subsidiary BAE Systems Maritime – Maritime Services provides through life maintenance, ship repair and drydock refit services for naval and merchant vessels.

Past projects have included the reactivation of the Upholder class, now reactivated as the Victoria-class submarines for the Royal Canadian Navy. It has also refitted two ex-Royal Navy Type 22 (Batch 2) frigates for the Romanian Naval Forces and a similar programme for the Chilean Navy involving the refurbishment of three ex-Royal Navy Type 23 frigates.

In July 2009, BVT Surface Fleet established the Gulf Logistics and Naval Support joint venture with Abu Dhabi Shipbuilding, to provide in-region maritime support services for CCASG member states.

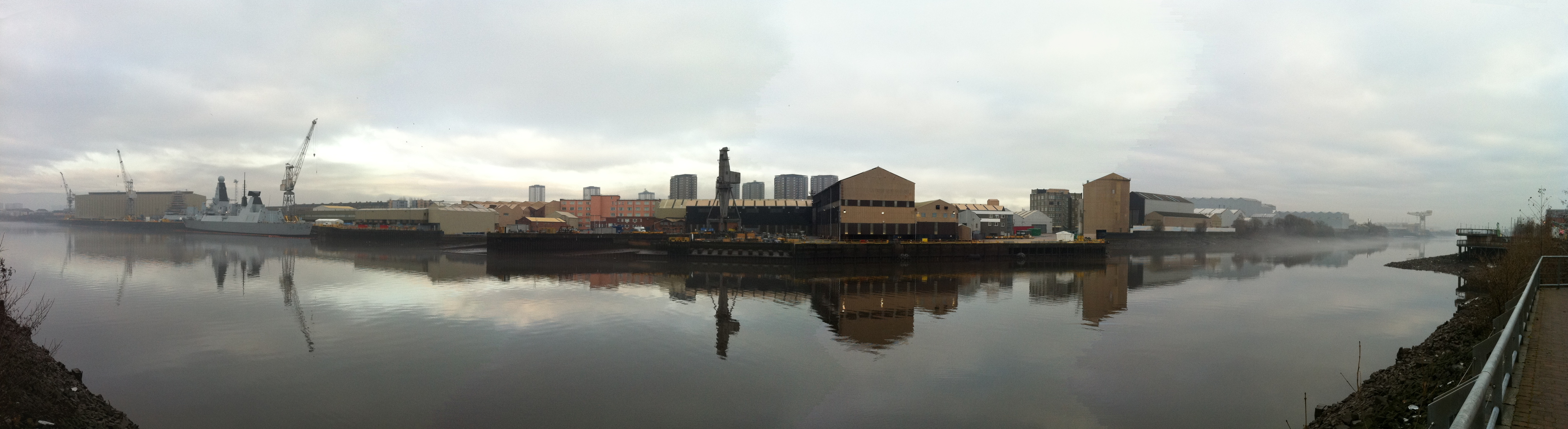
Panoramic view of BAE Systems Scotstoun in December 2010, with HMS Dragon on the left preparing for sea trials.

== See also ==
- BAE Systems
- BAE Systems Marine (1999–2003)
- BAE Systems Naval Ships (2003–2006)
- BAE Systems Surface Fleet Solutions (2006–2008)
- BAE Systems Maritime – Maritime Services (2012–present)
- BAE Systems Submarines (2012–present)
- VT Group
- BAE Systems Ship Repair (United States)
  - BAE Systems Southeast Shipyards
- BAE Systems Australia (Naval)
