= Brighton Marina =

Area of Brighton, East Sussex

Coordinates: 50.8125°N 0.103°W

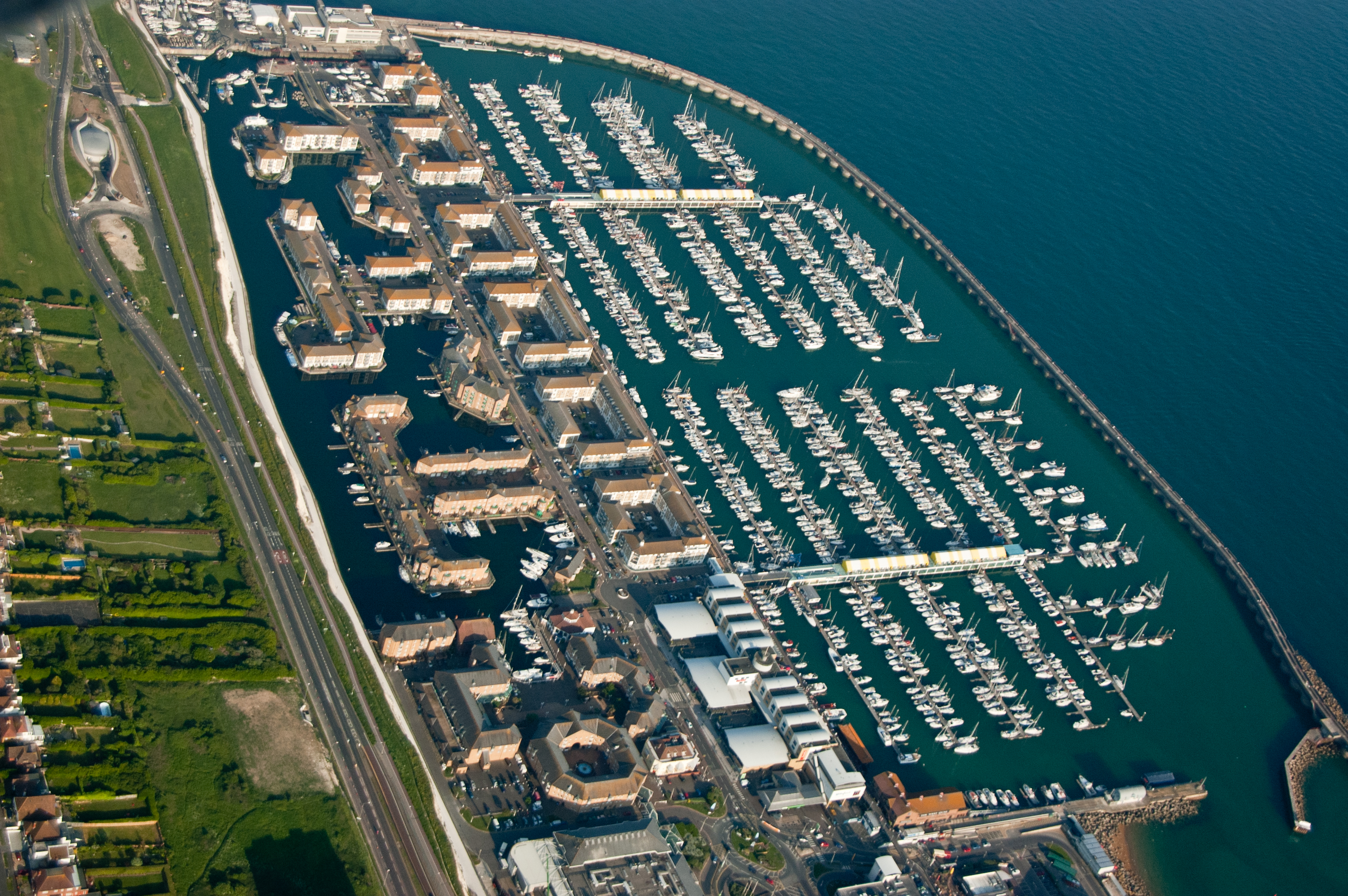
- Brighton Marina from the air

- Location within East Sussex
- Unitary authority: Brighton and Hove
- Ceremonial county: East Sussex
- Region: South East
- Country: England
- Sovereign state: United Kingdom
- Post town: BRIGHTON
- Postcode district: BN2
- Dialling code: 01273
- Police: Sussex
- Fire: East Sussex
- Ambulance: South East Coast
- UK Parliament: Brighton, Kemptown

Brighton Marina is an artificial marina in Brighton, England. It features a working harbour and residential housing alongside a variety of leisure, retail and commercial activities. The construction of the marina itself took place between 1971 and 1979, although developments within it have continued ever since. The marina covers an area of approximately 127 acres (0.51 km^{2}).

== History ==
The Brighton Marina Act 1968 (c. ii) provided the legal basis for the construction of the marina. Brighton Corporation purchased the foreshore at the Black Rock site from the Crown Estate Commissioners for £50,000 on 1 March 1972. On the same day the land was leased to the Brighton Marina Company for a period of 125 years. The architect of the original plan was David Hodges of the Louis de Soissons Partnership. Construction of the marina commenced in 1971 and was opened for use in 1978. The marina was officially opened by Queen Elizabeth II on 31 May 1979. The original funders were the National Westminster Bank, the Electricity Supply Pension Fund and Royal Insurance.

A SeaJet service ran from the marina to Dieppe in France between 1979 and 1980. Two Boeing Jetfoils were used, with three "flights" per day. The service suffered from poor reliability of the Jetfoils in the early stages, was restricted due to mid-channel wave height, and suffered during the French fishermen's blockade of channel ports.

Brent Walker purchased the marina and adjoining land in 1985 and undertook further development. Brunswick Developments purchased the marina for £9m from Brent Walker's receivers in 1996.

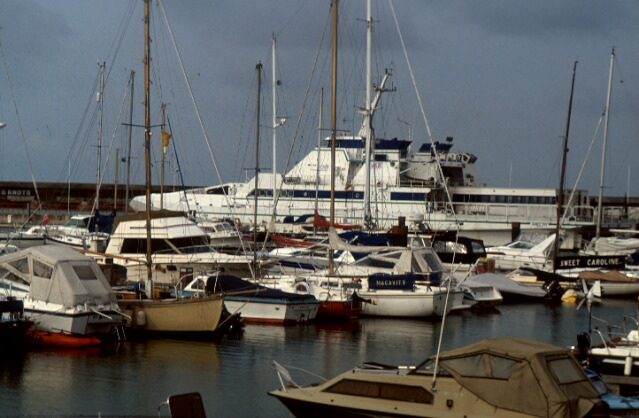
Ferry to Fécamp, 1992

In 1992 there was a trial of summer-season passenger services to Fécamp, France, using a small catamaran ferry.

From 2003 to 2010, the marina hosted an annual, weekend event called "The Big Splash". It featured street performers, fireworks and aqua themed entertainment and coincided with the final days of the Brighton Festival.

== Ownership ==
Wellcome Trust acquired Premier Marinas Limited ("PML") from the BlackRock UK Property Fund ("BlackRock") in 2015, for an undisclosed amount. Amongst previous owners, Brunswick Developments Group plc owned the head lease of Brighton Marina. The marine operations are leased to Premier Marinas. The underlease for the commercial activities was purchased by X-Leisure from Parkridge Developments in August 2004 for £65m. In 2013 Land Securities acquired majority control of X-Leisure.

== Marina facilities ==
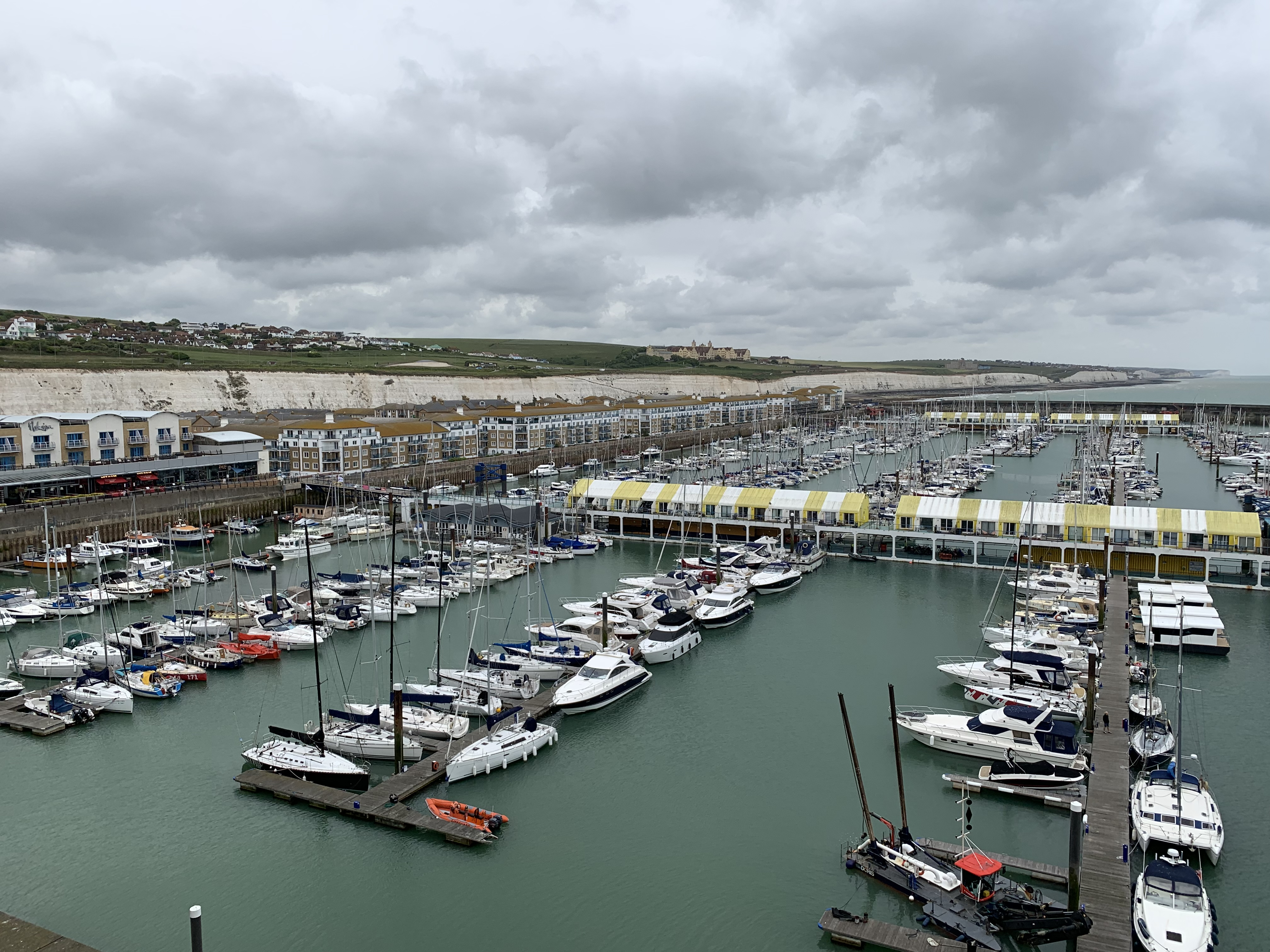
Brighton Marina and the Brighton Marina Reception from the Sirius Boardwalk Apartments

Operated by Premier Marinas, the marina provides 1,600 berths along with various ancillary services including a boatyard and fuel berth. Other marina services including boat sales, equipment shops and boat trips are provided by a variety of commercial operators.

The RNLI operates an inshore lifeboat from a station built in 2000 on the west quay.

=== Attractions and businesses ===
- David Lloyd Leisure
- McDonald's
- Asda
- Cineworld
- Hollywood Bowl
- The Works Outlet
- Globalls
- Malmaison Hotel
- Prezzo
- Pizza Express
- Nando's
- Wetherspoons

== Residential ==
On the east and south side of the marina there are a number of residential buildings made up of townhouses and apartments, some of which come with their own moorings.

== Expansion plans ==
=== Outer Harbour Development ===
Planning permission for a new district of the marina to contain 853 new apartments, cafés, bars and restaurants was approved by Brighton & Hove City Council in July 2006. The development is planned for the south-western part of the marina and would partly sit on stilts over the main spending beach. The centrepiece building is to be a skyscraper dubbed The Roaring Forties which would stand at 40 storeys tall and include a public viewing platform on the top floor. Two new pedestrian bridges are to be included in the scheme: one retractable bridge to link the marina arms and the second to link the western beach with the new scheme. The developers are Brunswick Developments and the architects are Wilkinson Eyre. In 2006, CABE highlighted the development as one of four national developments demonstrating best practice in design and planning.

Until 2013 no significant building work has started and the whole project had been put on hold in view of the poor financial climate. However, in April 2013, Brunswick Developments announced that construction would commence in September 2013. This part of the development is known as Phase 1 and includes two buildings on the West Quay made up of 195 flats, a RNLI building and seven restaurants.

=== Inner Harbour Development ===
A planning application to redevelop much of the west side of the marina was submitted in September 2007. The plans included several tall apartment blocks (the tallest would be Marina Point which would be 28 storeys high and Quayside which was to be 16 storeys), various new retail provisions including small shops, a new central square (where the current roundabout stands) and an "eco park", connected to the Undercliff Walk. The ASDA supermarket would be demolished and rebuilt to a larger size with car parking underground and apartments above, freeing up the considerable space presently used for its open-air car park, allowing for further development. The petrol station and McDonald's would also be demolished and rebuilt under this scheme. Around five new apartment blocks would be added to the marina in total. The developers were Explore Living, a division of Laing O'Rourke, and the architects were Allies and Morrison.

Planning permission was refused in December 2008. The developer appealed against the planning decision and a public inquiry commenced in November 2009. The appeal was dismissed in July 2010.

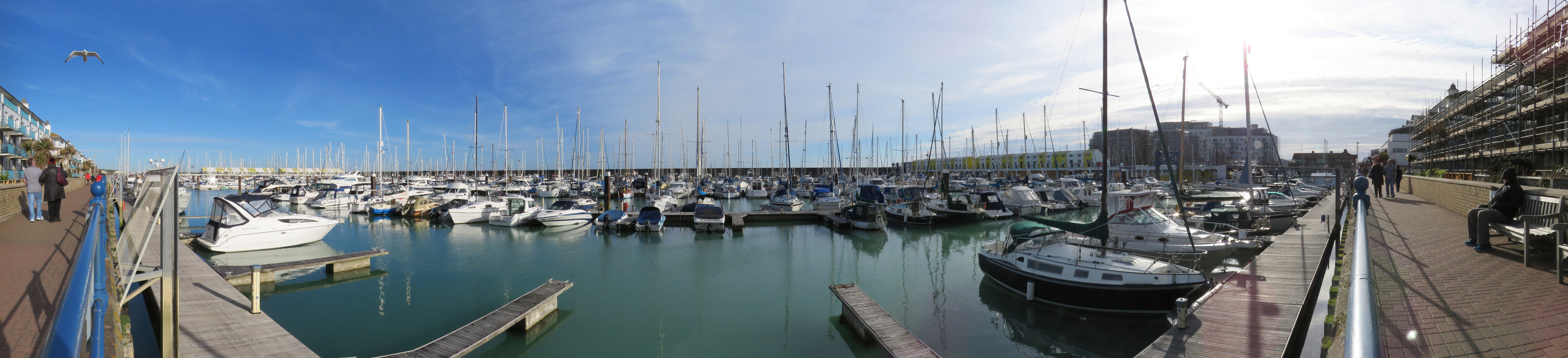
Panoramic image of the inner harbour of Brighton Marina
