= HMS Daring (D32) =

2009 Type 45 or Daring-class air-defence destroyer of the Royal Navy

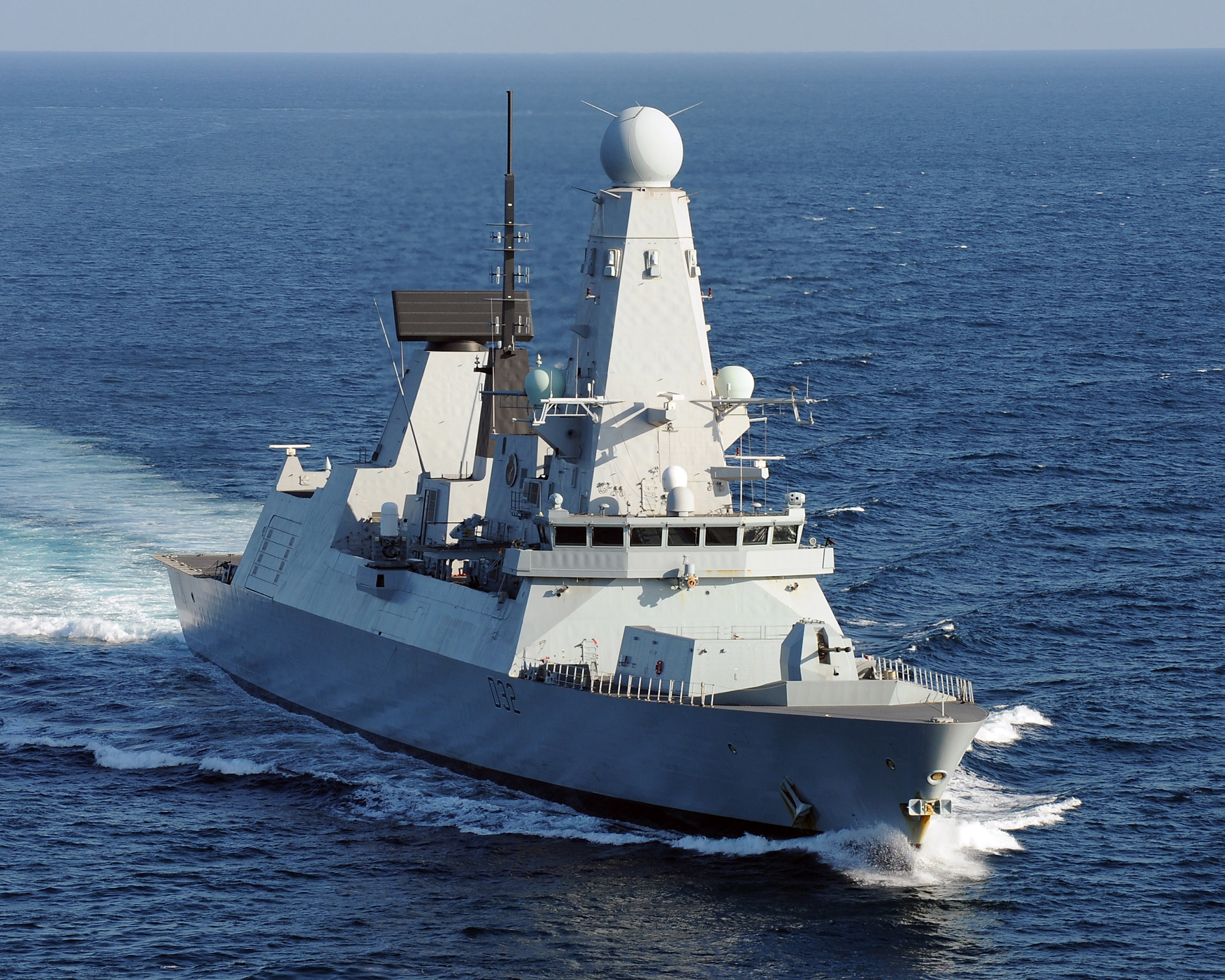
- HMS Daring in 2012

History

United Kingdom
- Name: HMS Daring
- Namesake: Gaius Mucius Scaevola
- Ordered: 20 December 2000
- Builder: BAE Systems Naval Ships, Govan, Scotland
- Yard number: 1061
- Laid down: 28 March 2003
- Launched: 1 February 2006
- Sponsored by: The Duchess of Edinburgh
- Commissioned: 23 July 2009
- Home port: HMNB Portsmouth
- Identification: Deck code: DA; Pennant number: D32; International call sign: GPLA; IMO number: 4907749
- Motto: Splendide audax; ("Finely Daring")
- Status: Undergoing Upkeep at HM Naval Base Portsmouth
- Badge: On a Field Black, an arm and a hand in a cresset of fire all Proper

General characteristics
- Class & type: Type 45 Guided missile destroyer
- Displacement: 8,500 to 9,200 t (9,100 long tons; 10,100 short tons)
- Length: 152.4 m (500 ft 0 in)
- Beam: 21.2 m (69 ft 7 in)
- Draught: 7.4 m (24 ft 3 in)
- Installed power: 2 × Rolls-Royce WR-21 gas turbines, 21.5 MW (28,800 shp) each; 3 × MTU 4000 series diesel generators, 3 MW (4,000 shp) each
- Propulsion: 2 shafts integrated electric propulsion with; 2 × GE Power Conversion, Advanced Induction Motors and VDM25000 Drives, 20 MW (27,000 shp) each
- Speed: In excess of 30 kn (56 km/h; 35 mph)
- Range: In excess of 7,000 nautical miles (13,000 km) at 18 kn (33 km/h)
- Complement: 191 (accommodation for up to 235)
- Sensors & processing systems: SAMPSON multi-function air tracking radar (Type 1045); S1850M 3-D air surveillance radar (Type 1046); Raytheon Integrated Bridge and Navigation System; 2 × Raytheon AHRS INS (MINS 2); 2 × Raytheon I-band Radar (Type 1047); 1 × Raytheon E/F-band Radar (Type 1048); Ultra Electronics Series 2500 Electro-Optical Gun Control System (EOGCS); Ultra Electronics SML Technologies radar tracking system; Ultra Electronics/EDO MFS-7000 sonar
- Electronic warfare & decoys: UAT Mod 2.0 (2.1 planned); AN/SSQ-130 Ship Signal Exploitation Equipment (SSEE) Increment F cryptologic exploitation system; Seagnat; Naval Decoy IDS300; Surface Ship Torpedo Defence
- Armament: Anti-air missiles: PAAMS air-defence system; 48 × Sylver vertical launching system A50 for: Aster 15 missiles (range 1.7–30 km); Aster 30 missiles (range 3–120 km), to be upgraded with a ballistic missile defence capability, called Sea Viper Evolution.; 24 × Sea Ceptor silos to be fitted starting on HMS Defender from 2026 for: 24 × surface-to-air missiles that will replace the Aster 15 missiles to allow all 48 × Sylver vertical launching systems to be used for Aster 30.]; Anti-ship missiles: Harpoon Block 1C SSMs, originally fit (retired 2023); to be replaced with Naval Strike Missile in due course); Guns: 1 × 4.5 inch Mark 8 naval gun; 2 × DS30B Mk 1 30 mm guns; 2 × 20 mm Phalanx CIWS; 2 × 7.62 mm Miniguns (replaced by Browning .50 caliber heavy machine guns as of 2023); 6 × 7.62 mm general purpose machine guns
- Aircraft carried: 1–2 × Lynx Wildcat, armed with: Martlet multirole missiles, or; Sea Venom anti-ship missiles (initial operating capability in October 2025; projected to achieve full operational capability in 2026) or; 2 × anti submarine torpedoes; or; 1 × Westland Merlin, armed with: 4 × anti-submarine torpedoes
- Aviation facilities: Large flight deck; Enclosed hangar

HMS Daring is the lead ship of the Type 45 or Daring-class air-defence destroyers built for the Royal Navy, and the seventh ship to hold that name. She was launched in 2006 on the Clyde and conducted contractor's sea trials during 2007 and 2008. She was handed over to the Royal Navy in December 2008, entered her base port of Portsmouth for the first time in January 2009 and was formally commissioned on 23 July 2009. As the lead ship of the first destroyer class built for the Royal Navy since the Type 42 in the 1970s, she has attracted significant media and public attention. Her name, crest and motto are a reference to the Roman youth Gaius Mucius Scaevola, famed for his bravery.

== Construction ==
Daring's construction began at the BAE Systems Naval Ships yard (now BAE Systems Surface Ships) at Govan on the River Clyde in March 2003. The ship was launched at 14.21 GMT on 1 February 2006 and later moved downriver to BAE's Scotstoun yard, formerly Yarrows. The Countess of Wessex (now Duchess of Edinburgh) was the ship's sponsor at her launch. On 16 November 2006, the Countess of Wessex brought Daring to life on her first official visit. On 17 November 2006, the countess switched on the ship's diesel generators, part of the 'powering up' ceremony.

== Sea trials ==
On 18 July 2007 Daring sailed on the first set of sea trials (Stage 1.1), successfully completing them four weeks later on 14 August 2007. As she is the first in the class some structural areas needed to be tested, including the loads that the main 4.5-inch Mark 8 naval gun puts on the ship. During these trials, Daring reached her design speed of 29 knots (54 km/h) in 70 seconds and achieved a speed of 31.5 knots (58 km/h) in 120 seconds. She sailed for Stage 1.2 on 30 March 2008 and returned on 2 May. Stage 1.2 included trials on the Long Range Radar and navigation system, medium calibre gun blast trials, weapon alignment tests and endurance tests. Stage 1.3 trials were conducted between 26 August and 22 September 2008 and emphasis was placed on testing the full range of communications equipment. The ship's company used the opportunity to conduct familiarisation and training activities in preparation for the transfer of the vessel to the Royal Navy in December 2008. Stage 2 trials took place in 2009, once the ship had been handed over to the Royal Navy. HMS Daring arrived in her home port of Portsmouth on 28 January 2009 to large crowds along the seafront. She was given the honour of a flypast to coincide with her passing of the Round Tower, just outside Portsmouth.

== Operational service ==
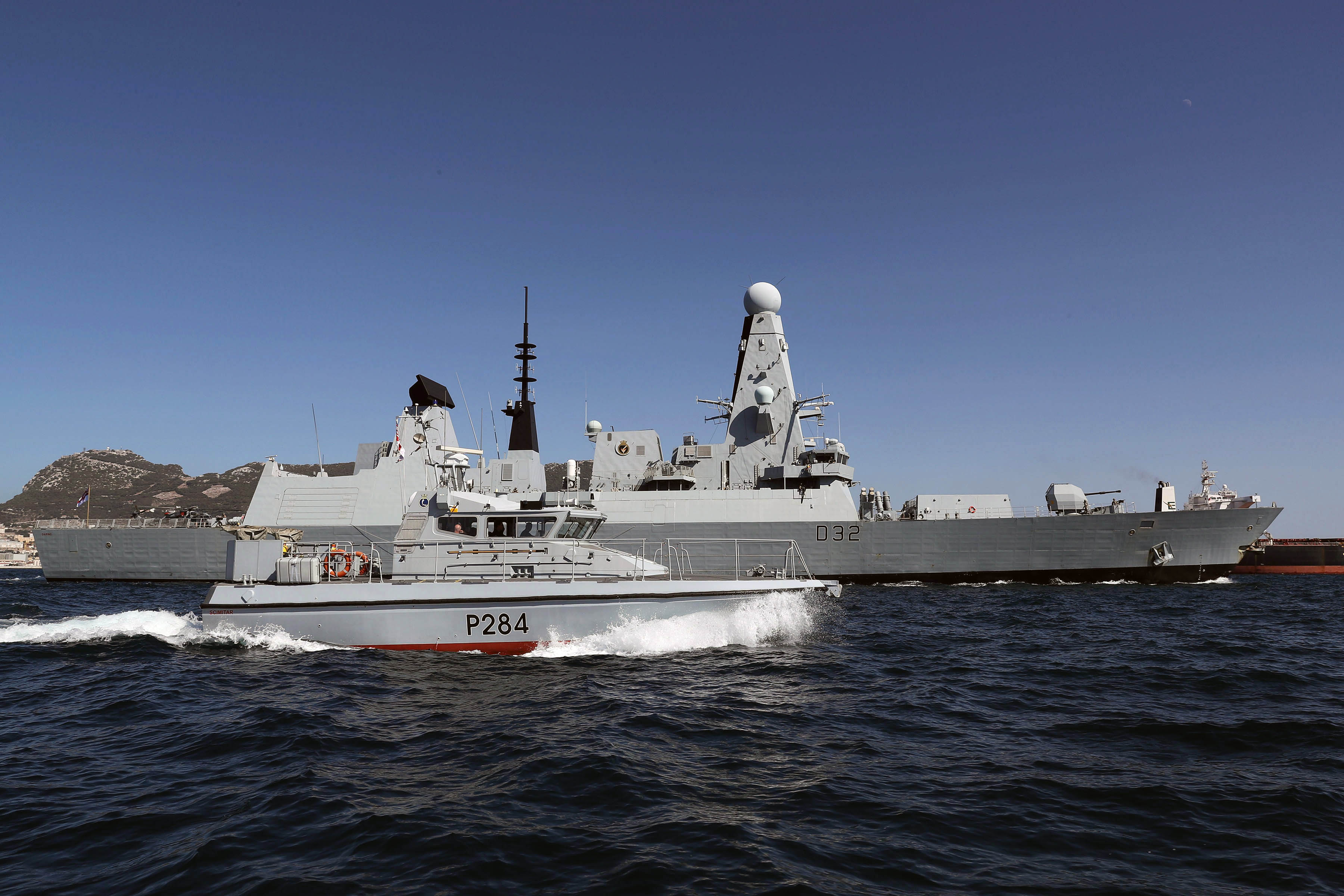
Daring arrives in Gibraltar in 2016, escorted by HMS Scimitar

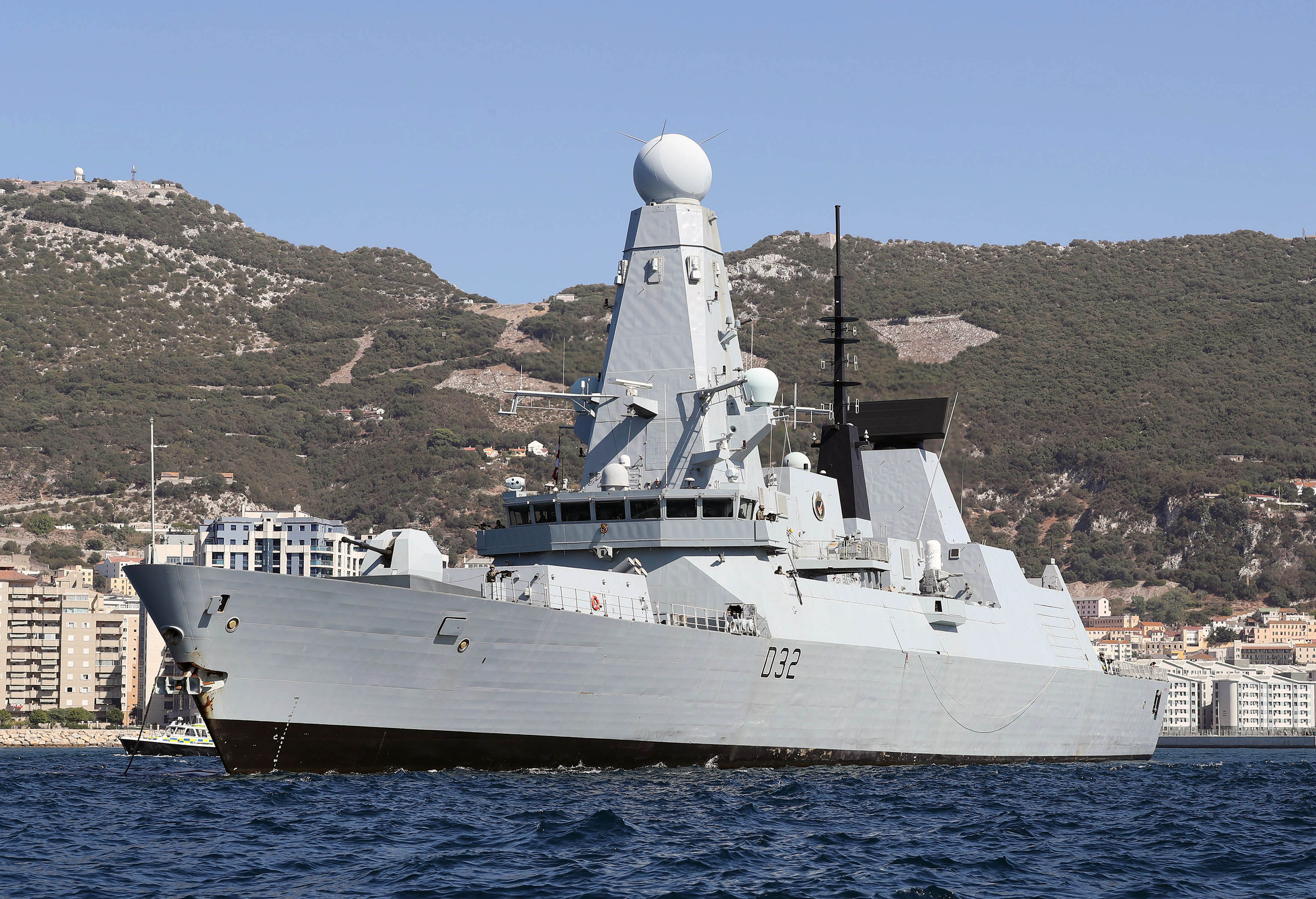
Visiting Gibraltar in 2016

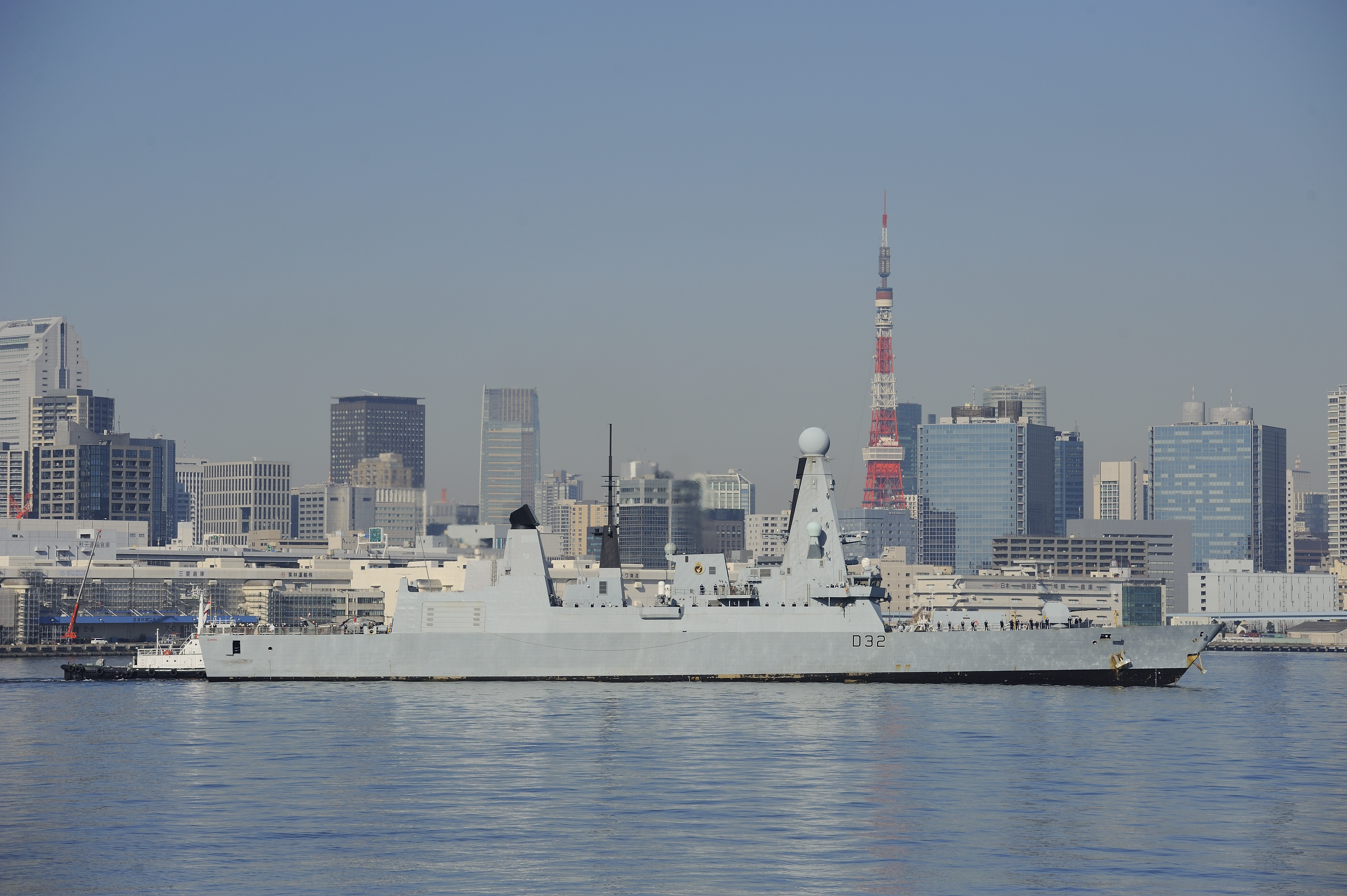
Visiting Tokyo, Japan in 2013

Daring was formally commissioned on 23 July 2009 with The Countess of Wessex inspecting an honour guard on the quayside, and reception. The commissioning cake was cut by the wife of the commanding officer and Able Seaman Daniel Small, who was the youngest member of the ship's company. Daring was declared officially "in service" one year later, on 31 July 2010.

Daring fired her first Sea Viper missile in May 2011 during a test launch in the Outer Hebrides, after years of trials. During the same year she was equipped with two Phalanx CIWS mounted on either side of the superstructure.

On 6 January 2012, the Royal Navy announced that Daring would leave Portsmouth on 11 January 2012 to undertake her first mission, a deployment to the Persian Gulf. Daring travelled through the Suez Canal on 2 February 2012, then continued on to the Persian Gulf, relieving the Type 23 frigate HMS Argyll that was on station there. In February 2012, as part of the Persian Gulf deployment, Daring joined Operation Scimitar Anzac, an anti-piracy operation in the Red Sea and the Gulf of Aden. This international operation included the Royal Fleet Auxiliary RFA Wave Knight, the Royal Australian Navy frigate HMAS Parramatta, and the Pakistan Navy's PNS Babur. Daring acted as the command ship for all the vessels. During operation in the Persian Gulf and North Arabian Sea, Daring operated with the U.S. Navy's Carrier Strike Group One and Carrier Strike Group Nine.

In September 2013, Daring transited the Panama Canal on deployment to the Pacific Ocean. She made port visits to the US Naval Base San Diego, Joint Base Pearl Harbor–Hickam, and the Marshall Islands. While in the Pacific, Daring took part in the Royal Australian Navy's International Fleet Review 2013 at Sydney and also participated in the 2013 Five Power Defence Arrangements exercise, Bersama Lima. During Bersama Lima, Daring was urgently dispatched to the Philippines as part of the British government's humanitarian response to Typhoon Haiyan. Before her return to the United Kingdom, Daring made port visits in Japan, South Korea, China, Vietnam, Thailand and Malaysia.

On 4 July 2016, Daring fired an Aster 30 off the coast of Scotland.

In September 2016 Daring deployed to the Persian Gulf to assist in Operation Inherent Resolve. In April 2017, after being relieved East of Suez by Monmouth, Daring transited the Bosphorus for exercises in the Black Sea with the Romanian Navy.

Daring was laid up, pending a refit, from 2017 to 2020. She began her refit in June 2020 and received a visit from her sponsor, the Countess of Wessex, in 2021 to see the progress of the work. On 15 September 2021, Daring left Portsmouth for the first time in four years under tow bound for Cammell Laird shipyard in Birkenhead to allow work to be carried out installing new generators under the Power Improvement Project (PIP). PIP installation work was completed by Cammell Laird at the end of 2022 and the ship was returned to Portsmouth in January 2023 to complete refit and regeneration. On 18 August 2025, it was 3000 days since Daring had last been to sea. As of February 2026, Daring was expected to rejoin the RN fleet later in the year, and was reported to have taken on fuel in September 2026.

== Affiliations ==
=== Ship's sponsor ===
- The Duchess of Edinburgh

=== Official affiliations ===
- Leicestershire County
- City of Birmingham
- Warwickshire District Sea Cadets
- Guernsey
- The Royal Dragoon Guards
- No. 11 Squadron RAF
- HMS Forward (Birmingham Royal Naval Reserve)
- The Daring Association
- King Edward's School, Birmingham
- 4th Knowle Sea Scout Group
- Worshipful Company of Carpenters (a City of London livery company)
- Birmingham University Royal Naval Unit
- The D-Boats Association
- Midland Naval Officers Association
- Daring Class Yachts
