= Trafalgar Wharf, Portsmouth =

Shipyard in Portsmouth, England

Coordinates: 50.84604°N 1.11627°W

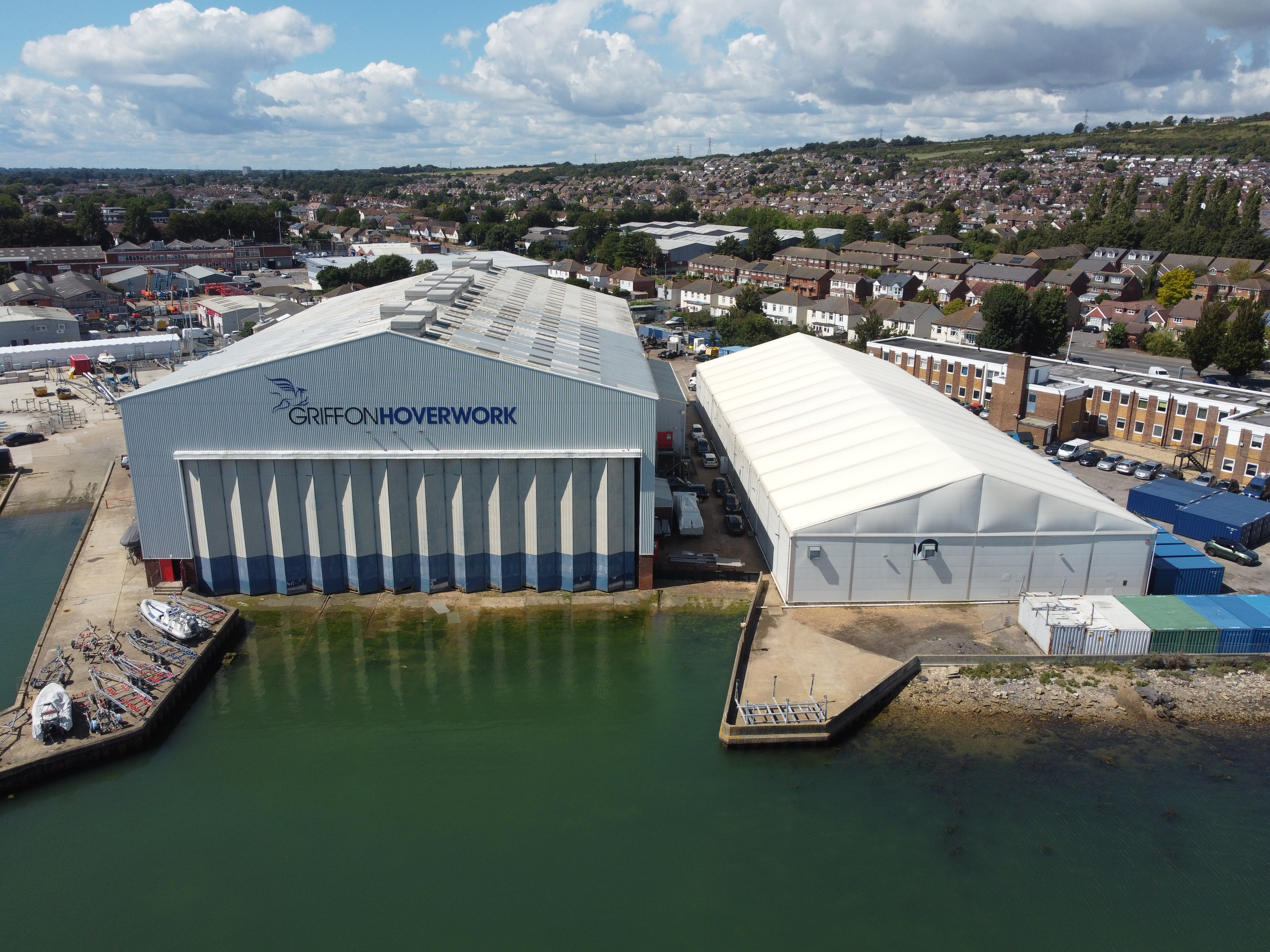
Griffon Hoverwork at Trafalgar Wharf

Trafalgar Wharf is a shipyard in Portsmouth accommodating marine engineering businesses ranging from sailmakers and boat brokers to boat builders. It was formerly the VT Halmatic shipyard, owned by VT Group and latterly by BVT Surface Fleet. In November 2023 the site was acquired by Premier Marinas who also operate Port Solent marina opposite.

== History ==
In September 2008, Trafalgar Wharf Ltd took over the former BVT Surface Fleet site and renamed it Trafalgar Wharf. The site is the former VT Halmatic shipyard where many smaller Royal Navy warships, such as Fast Patrol Boats and Corvettes were built. BVT Surface Fleet had been formed by the merger of the BAE Systems Surface Fleet Solutions subsidiary with VT Shipbuilding, itself originating as Vosper Thorneycroft. With the sale of the Portchester site, they vacated the yard, bringing an end to the company's use of the area, consolidating operations at its Shipyard facilities in HMNB Portsmouth. The site has evolved over the years to now encompass Europe’s largest indoor dry stack boat storage facility for over 300 small boats and a significant commercial shipyard providing bespoke refit and maintenance programmes for commercial vessels and private yachts. On the 23rd November 2023, the site was purchased by Premier Marinas adding to the companies existing portfolio of 10 marina and boatyard sites across the South Coast. The wider Trafalgar Wharf site has also become a hub for a wide range of marine and non-marine businesses and will now be known as Premier Trafalgar Wharf.

== Site ==
The 22-acre (89,000 m^{2}) Trafalgar Wharf site is located in the upper reaches of Portsmouth Harbour, opposite Port Solent. The company intends to remain true to its industrial roots, combining light marine trade with heavier industries. The site offers a wide range of space for marine businesses in buildings ranging from the massive 400 ft (120 m) main shed, probably the largest building of its kind on the south coast, to smaller individual business units including office space, housing many companies, overlooking Port Solent Marina.

Premier Trafalgar Wharf, an indoor dry stack boat storage is available in Portsmouth Harbour for motorboats, sportfishers and RIBs between 4 metres and 13 metres. Owned and operated by Premier Marinas' the companies dry stack team is capable of lifting two boats every 10 minutes using one of the three 42 tonne forklifts, which include telescopic cameras to provide advanced visibility, allowing the team to lift boats up 65 foot and down 25 foot. Trafalgar Wharf can accommodate up to 380 boats, making it the UK's largest indoor dry stack facility.
