= Premier Marinas =

Premier Marinas Limited
- Founded: 1994
- Headquarters: Hampshire, England
- Number of locations: 11
- Owner: Wellcome Trust
- Website: www.premiermarinas.com

Premier Marinas Limited, owned by the Wellcome Trust, is based in Hampshire. It owns and manages twelve coastal marinas and boatyards in England. Premier's marinas are situated on the south coast at Falmouth in Cornwall; Noss on Dart in Dartmouth; Swanwick, Universal Marina, on the hamble, Gosport, Port Solent, Trafalgar Wharf and Southsea in Hampshire; and Chichester, Brighton and Eastbourne in Sussex. Premier Marinas' core business is the ownership, management and development of these marina sites, including the provision of wet and dry berthing and boatyard services to leisure yachts and motorboats. The company hosts boat shows, including an annual boat show that has been occurring for over thirty years.

== Overview ==
=== History ===
Premier Marinas Limited was formed in 1994, when the then owner of Port Solent Marina, Arlington Properties Corporation, and the then owner of Chichester Marina, First Leisure Corporation, combined their marina assets to create the new company. The latter has since grown through the further acquisition of Falmouth Marina in December 1996, Brighton Marina in March 2000, Southsea Marina in November 2002, Gosport Marina in December 2003 and subsequently Endeavour Quay, a boatyard adjacent to Gosport Marina, in August 2014. The programme of acquisitions went on to add Swanwick Marina in December 2005, Sovereign Harbour Marina in Eastbourne, in July 2007 and Noss on Dart Marina in April 2016. In July 2021 the company further expanded with the acquisition of another marina on the Hamble River, Universal Marina, In November 2023 Premier acquired Trafalgar Wharf, located in Portsmouth Harbour; taking the number of owned marinas to eleven.

In 2015 Premier Marinas Limited was acquired by the Wellcome Trust.

In 2025 Premier Marinas acquired the marina group Boatfolk, expanding to be the largest marina group in the UK. The company now own and operate 22 marinas within the UK, including Conwy in Wales and Rhu in Scotland.

=== Awards ===
Premier's marinas are recognised under the Yacht Harbour Association's Gold Anchor scheme. Sovereign Harbour in Eastbourne, Brighton Marina, Chichester Marina, Southsea Marina, Port Solent Marina, Gosport Marina and Falmouth marina all hold the 'Five Gold Anchors' award.

=== Facilities ===
Each marina has boatyard services, marine diesel and petrol, security, electricity and water, toilet, shower and laundrette facilities, car parking and on-site dining options. Collectively, Premier has over 5,000 marina pontoon berths and onshore boat storage for more than 2,000 vessels. Across eleven marinas, Premier has over 300,000 square feet of property for commercial rent; the greater part of this space is occupied by services complementary to the marinas, including food and beverage, marine chandlery, boat maintenance and repair, boat sales and brokerage and sail making.

== Events ==
The company holds periodic events, including boat shows at their marinas, including the annual Southampton International Boat Show held at Mayflower Park. In 2011 Premier Marinas became involved in the Royal Yachting Association's (RYA) Active Marina Programme. The RYA is working with marinas and sailing schools in the UK to provide boat owners with part-subsidised training workshops aimed at increasing confidence and competence on the water. Premier Marinas' Sovereign Harbour in Eastbourne was one of the first marinas to launch the scheme in summer 2011. Premier Marinas worked with the RYA and local sailing schools to organise a number of workshops for berth holders covering topics such as basic maneuvering and berthing skills and electronic navigation.

== See also ==
- Boating
- Yachting
