= HMS Pursuer (P273) =

1988 Archer-class patrol vessel of the Royal Navy

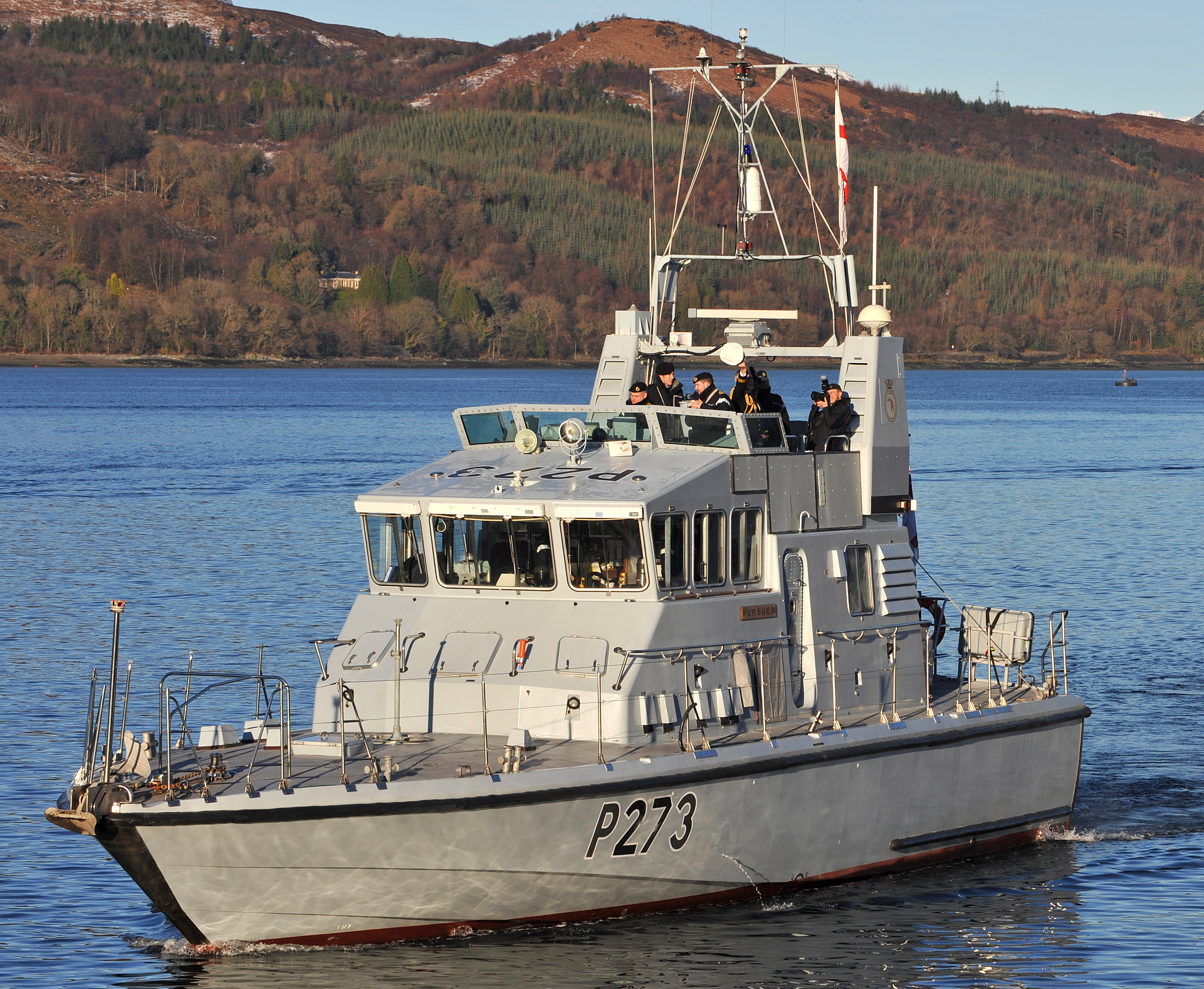
- HMS Pursuer, 2011

History

United Kingdom
- Name: HMS Pursuer
- Builder: Vosper Thornycroft
- Sponsored by: Ballyregan Bob
- Commissioned: 1988
- Home port: Faslane
- Identification: MMSI number: 235010470; Callsign: GAAT; Pennant number: P273
- Motto: Relentless Pursuit
- Status: In active service
- Badge

General characteristics
- Class & type: Archer-class patrol vessel
- Displacement: 54 t (53 long tons)
- Length: 20.8 m (68 ft 3 in)
- Beam: 5.8 m (19 ft 0 in)
- Draught: 1.8 m (5 ft 11 in)
- Propulsion: 2 shafts, Cat C18 ACERT diesels
- Speed: 16 kn (30 km/h); 45 kn (83 km/h) (Hull design, but limited due to engine fitted)
- Range: 550 nmi (1,020 km)
- Complement: 18 (training) (Note: 5 ship's company, 1 training officer, 12 URNU students.); 12 (operational)
- Sensors & processing systems: Decca 1216 navigation radar
- Armament: 1 × Oerlikon 20 mm cannon on fo'c'sle ("for but not with"); 3 × General purpose machine guns (Note: When operational and not in URNU role.)

HMS Pursuer is an Archer-class P2000 patrol and training vessel of the Royal Navy.

== History ==
Pursuer was built at Vosper Thorneycroft and commissioned in 1988. The famous greyhound Ballyregan Bob was guest of honour at her launch, a unique recognition of the greyhound on her badge. Prior to 2003 Pursuer was the training vessel of Sussex University Royal Naval Unit (SUSURNU).

Pursuer and HMS Dasher were sent to Cyprus ahead of Operation Telic, the US-led invasion of Iraq in 2003, transported on board the CEC Mayflower. The Royal Navy Cyprus Squadron was created in February 2003 to protect ships around the Sovereign Base Areas in Cyprus, a vital staging post in the British logistic chain to Iraq. Both were fitted with Kevlar armour and three FN MAG general purpose machine guns, with an extra crew member (compared to the P2000s assigned to URNU duties) employed as a Gunners Yeoman. In 2007 she helped rescue the fishing vessel Seafighter3 which had run aground on Cape Zevgari.

The Cyprus Squadron was disbanded in 2010 and Pursuer was assigned to the Faslane Patrol Boat Squadron, protecting the ballistic missile submarines at HMNB Clyde. In September 2012 her force protection duties were taken over by the more modern HMS Tracker and she was reassigned to Glasgow URNU.

From 2020 to 2022 she was posted to Gibraltar Squadron. In July 2020, Pursuer escorted the Spanish patrol boat Serviola out of Gibraltar's territorial waters. The Spanish vessel had remained in British waters for roughly 45 minutes, and the intrusion drew criticism from British maritime officials following the incident.

Following her deployment to Gibraltar, Pursuer was assigned to the Navy's Coastal Forces Squadron. In June 2024, Pursuer and her sister ship HMS Puncher, embarked personnel from the Navy's the Mine and Threat Exploitation Group for exercises and deployed for exercises in the Baltic Sea. The vessels operated an IVER 3 autonomous vehicle as well as a Video Ray Defender remotely operated vehicle to find mines on the seabed.
