= HMS Dasher (P280) =

1988 Archer-class patrol vessel of the Royal Navy

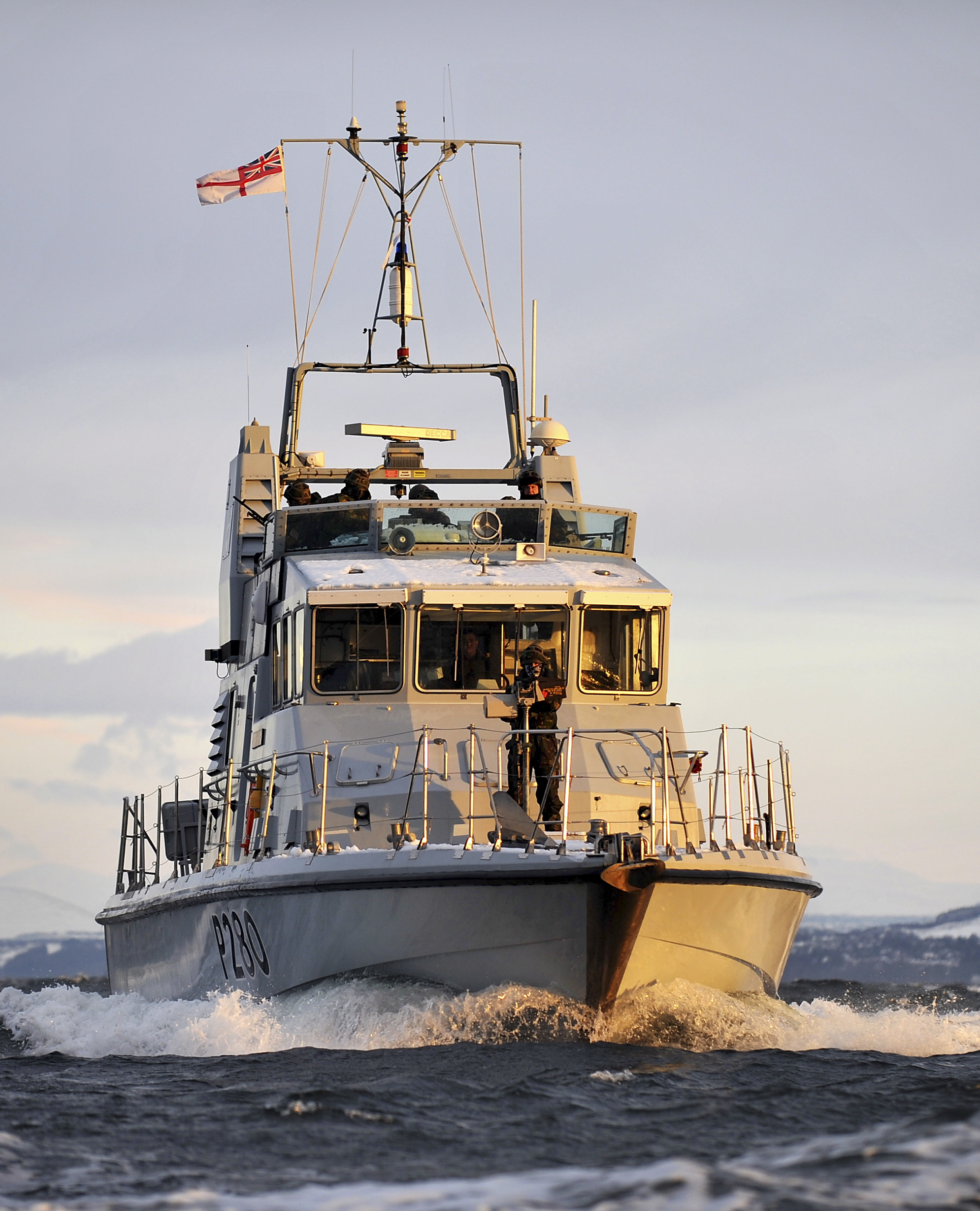
- HMS Dasher at Faslane in 2010

History

United Kingdom
- Name: HMS Dasher
- Operator: Royal Navy
- Builder: Vosper Thorneycroft
- Commissioned: 1988
- Home port: HMNB Devonport
- Identification: MMSI number: 235010480; Callsign: GAAV; Pennant number: P280
- Status: In active service

General characteristics
- Class & type: Archer-class patrol vessel
- Displacement: 54 t (53 long tons)
- Length: 20.8 m (68 ft 3 in)
- Beam: 5.8 m (19 ft 0 in)
- Draught: 1.8 m (5 ft 11 in)
- Propulsion: 2 shafts, Cat C18 ACERT diesel engine, 873 bhp (651 kW)
- Speed: 21 kn (39 km/h; 24 mph); 45 kn (83 km/h; 52 mph) (Hull design, but limited due to engine fitted)
- Range: 300 nmi (560 km)
- Complement: 18 (training) (Note: 5 ship's company, 1 training officer, 12 URNU students.); 12 (operational)
- Sensors & processing systems: Decca 1216 navigation radar
- Armament: 1 × Oerlikon 20 mm cannon on fo'c'sle ("for but not with"); 3 × General purpose machine guns (Note: When operational and not in URNU role.)

HMS Dasher is an Archer-class P2000 patrol and training vessel of the British Royal Navy. Dasher was built at Vosper Thorneycroft and commissioned in 1988.

== Operational history ==
Prior to 2004, Dasher was based at Devonport as the training vessel for University Royal Naval Unit Bristol (URNUB).

Dasher and HMS Pursuer were sent to Cyprus ahead of Operation Telic, the US-led invasion of Iraq in 2003, transported on board the CEC Mayflower. The Royal Navy Cyprus Squadron was created in February 2003, to protect ships around the Sovereign Base Areas in Cyprus, a vital staging post in the British logistic chain to Iraq. Both were fitted with Kevlar armour and three FN MAG general purpose machine guns, with an extra crew member (compared to the P2000s assigned to URNU duties) employed as a gunners yeoman.

The Cyprus Squadron was disbanded in 2010 and Dasher was assigned to the Faslane Patrol Boat Squadron, protecting the ballistic missile submarines at HMNB Clyde. In September 2012, she swapped places with the more modern HMS Raider and returned to Devonport as the training vessel of Bristol URNU.

From 2020 to 2022, she was posted to Gibraltar Squadron.

In 2025, Dasher and five of her sister ships deployed to the Baltic for joint exercises with allied navies. As part of these exercises, Dasher exercised with a submarine of the Royal Swedish Navy.
