= Royal Navy Cyprus Squadron =

- Active: 2003–2010
- Country: United Kingdom
- Branch: Royal Navy
- Type: Squadron
- Role: Coastal Security patrols, Sovereign Base Areas

The Royal Navy Cyprus Squadron (RNCS) was a Royal Naval Squadron based on the Mediterranean island of Cyprus from February 2003 until April 2010.

== History ==
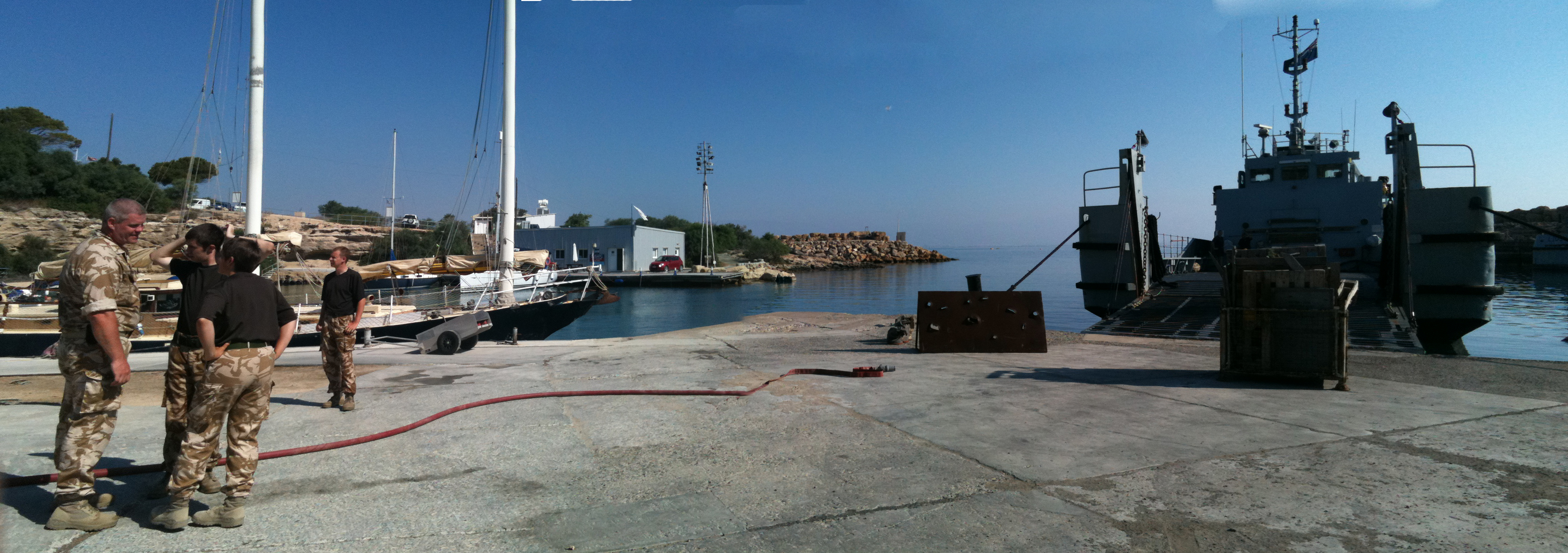
Akrotiri mole, where the squadron was based.

It was formed in February 2003 in support of Operation Telic, the British invasion of Iraq, and disbanded in April 2010. The squadron comprised two P2000-class patrol ships, HMS Pursuer and Dasher; these ships were reassigned to the Clyde Naval Base at Faslane in 2010.

The ships were based at Akrotiri Mole near RAF Akrotiri and were employed in the protection of visiting ships and other British Forces Cyprus equipment designated as high value. The Squadron was also employed in Internal Security patrols of the Sovereign Base Areas (SBA), and training for visiting Royal Navy ships. They had a secondary role supporting the police and customs and excise of the Sovereign Base Area.

== Commanding officer ==
The last commanding officer (December 2009) was Lieutenant Commander Charlie Barrow. He assumed command of the Cyprus Squadron in July 2009.

== RN Ships ==
The two ships of the squadron—Dasher and Pursuer—were fitted with Kevlar armour and the armament consisted of three FN MAG General Purpose Machine Guns, the ships' crews had one extra member (compared to the P2000s assigned to URNU duties) employed as a Gunners Yeoman, because of the weapons fitted.

== Specifications ==
- 16m Fast Patrol Class Statistics Displacement: 54 t (53 long tons)
- Length: 20.5 m (67 ft 3.1 in)
- Beam: 5.8 m (19 ft 0.3 in)
- Draught: 2.2 m (7 ft 2.6 in)
- Complement: 6
- Top Speed: 16 kn (30 km/h; 18 mph)
- Cruising Speed: 12 kn (22 km/h; 14 mph)
- Propulsion: 2 x Perkins CV 12 (Challenger 2 tank Engines)

== Sources ==
- The Cyprus Squadron at royal-navy.mod.uk
