= VT Group =

US defense and services company

VTG (formerly VT Group)
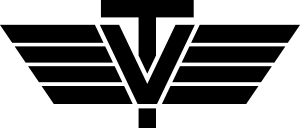
- Type: Wholly owned subsidiary
- Industry: Maritime, Aviation, Information Systems and Technology, Manufacturing and Fabrication, IT, Engineering, Infrastructure & Installation, Unmanned, Logistics & Training, Base Operations, Healthcare, Hospitality, Commercial, Government Solutions, Security & Surveillance, DoD
- Predecessor: Vosper & Company; John I. Thornycroft & Company
- Founded: 1866
- Headquarters: Chantilly, Virginia
- Key people: John Hassoun (CEO)
- Owner: VT Holdings, Inc.
- Subsidiaries: VT Milcom Inc. VT Services Inc. VT Aepco Inc. VT Griffin Inc. National Technologies Associates, Inc. Delta Resources, Inc. Intelligent Shift, LLC; Advanced Systems Supportability Engineering Technologies and Tools (ASSETT); Next Rev Technologies, Inc. Vana Solutions; Clear Cloud
- Website: vtgdefense.com

VTG (formerly VT Group) is a privately held United States defense and services company, with its origins in a former British shipbuilding group, previously known as Vosper Thornycroft. The British part of VTG was integrated into Babcock International in the early 2010s. In July 2012, The Resolute Fund II, LP, an affiliate of The Jordan Company acquired VTG. In September 2023, VTG received a new majority investment from A&M Capital Partners.

== History ==
VT Group plc was a British defence and services company, formerly known as Vosper Thornycroft. The company had diversified from shipbuilding into various engineering and support services, becoming involved in many areas of provision through five main operating groups: VT Communications, VT Education and Skills, VT Services Inc and VT Support Services. VT Group exited the shipbuilding industry in October 2009, after selling its 45% share of the Shipbuilding Joint Venture company BVT Surface Fleet to BAE Systems. Formerly listed on the London Stock Exchange and a constituent of the FTSE 250 Index, the remainder of the firm was acquired by Babcock International Group in July 2010.

Vosper Thornycroft company logo

The company was formed by the merger of two shipbuilding companies Vosper Limited of Portsmouth and J I Thornycroft of Woolston, Southampton in 1966, at which time the Company became listed on the London Stock Exchange as Vosper Thornycroft. Vosper Ltd built small boats and J I Thornycroft had a long history of building destroyers and similar sized craft. The company was nationalised by the Labour Government in 1977, becoming a division of British Shipbuilders. It became a commercial company again after a management buyout in 1985.

Vosper Thornycroft flourished even during lean times for warship building, mainly through successful sales efforts in exports and diversification outside the core shipbuilding business into training and support. In 1998, Vosper Thornycroft acquired the specialist military boatbuilder Halmatic, based in Portchester.

In 2001, in their most ambitious diversification project, VT started work on the US$55million superyacht Mirabella V for former Avis Car Hire boss Joe Vittoria. At the time of its completion in 2004, Mirabella V was the world's largest single-masted sailing vessel with an overall length of 75 metres and a mast height of approximately 87 metres.

From 2002, the overall business was known as VT Group plc.

=== Move to Portsmouth Naval Base and creation of BVT Surface Fleet ===
From its formation in 1966, the company was based at the former Thornycroft shipbuilding yard at Woolston in Southampton, Hampshire but in 2003 relocated its shipbuilding operations to new facilities in the HMNB Portsmouth Naval Dockyard under the name VT Shipbuilding. In 2008, VT Shipbuilding was merged with BAE Systems' Glasgow-based Surface Fleet Solutions subsidiary to form BVT Surface Fleet. The VT Halmatic boatyard site in Portchester was also sold off to Trafalgar Wharf, with Halmatic also moving into Portsmouth Naval Base.

=== Entry into the nuclear industry ===
In 2008, VT Group acquired BNG Project Services from the government-owned British Nuclear Fuels for £75m. As the provider of nuclear decommissioning and waste treatment engineering services, Project Services gave VT Group access to the nuclear industry in the UK and abroad. The business was renamed VT Nuclear Services.

=== Exit from BVT ===
On 28 January 2009 VT Group announced its intention to sell its share of BVT Surface Fleet to BAE Systems. VT Group's put option valued its share at a minimum of £380 million subject to conditions, however VT Group was expected to make a cash injection into the business to offset difficulties with contracts with Trinidad and Tobago and Oman. Following the sale of VT Group's 45% share, BVT Surface Fleet was renamed BAE Systems Surface Ships to reflect the total ownership.

=== Takeover and restructuring ===
In 2010, the British defence and construction company Babcock International purchased VT Group for £1.32bn.

Babcock integrated the UK portion of VT Group into its own business. In 2012, Babcock sold VT Group, which was by then US-based, to the private investment fund Resolute Fund II LP, linked to the Jordan Company.

In September 2023, VTG received a new majority investment from A&M Capital Partners.

VT Group rebranded as VTG in 2020.

== Subsidiaries ==
VTG is composed of 10 subsidiaries focused on maritime, aviation, information systems and technology, manufacturing and fabrication, digital transformation, and national security with more than 1500 employees.
