= List of patrol vessels of the Royal Navy =

This is a list of patrol boats of the Royal Navy.

== Active ==
- Archer-class patrol and training craft
  - Archer
  - Biter
  - Smiter
  - Pursuer
  - Blazer
  - Dasher
  - Puncher
  - Charger
  - Ranger
  - Trumpeter
  - Tracker
  - Raider
  - Express
  - Example
  - Explorer
  - Exploit
- River-class offshore patrol craft
  - Tyne
  - Severn
  - Mersey
  - Forth
  - Medway
  - Trent
  - Tamar
  - Spey

== Former ==
- Scimitar-class Gibraltar patrol craft
  - Scimitar
  - Sabre
- River-class offshore patrol craft
  - Clyde
- MTB 102 motor torpedo boat
- Gay-class interchangeable motor gunboat / torpedo boats
  - Gay Archer - launched 20 August 1952
  - Gay Bombardier - launched 20 August 1952
  - Gay Bowman - launched 19 December 1952
  - Gay Bruiser - launched 19 December 1952
  - Gay Carabineer - launched 22 January 1953
  - Gay Cavalier- launched 23 January 1953
  - Gay Centurion - launched 3 September 1952
  - Gay Charger - launched 12 January 1953
  - Gay Charioteer - launched 12 June 1953
  - Gay Dragoon - launched 28 January 1953
  - Gay Fencer - launched 18 February 1953
  - Gay Forester - launched 23 March 1954
- Dark-class interchangeable motor gunboat / torpedo boats
  - Dark Adventurer - launched 28 October 1954
  - Dark Aggressor - launched 9 December 1954
  - Dark Antagonist - launched 11 December 1954
  - Dark Avenger - launched 6 September 1955
  - Dark Biter - launched 23 June 1955
  - Dark Buccaneer - launched 30 September 1954
  - Dark Clipper - launched 9 February 1955
  - Dark Fighter - launched 4 October 1955
  - Dark Gladiator - launched 5 December 1956
  - Dark Hero - launched 16 March 1957
  - Dark Highwayman - launched 29 March 1955
  - Dark Hunter - launched 18 March 1954
  - Dark Hussar - launched 16 May 1957
  - Dark Intruder - launched 6 July 1955
  - Dark Invader - launched 5 September 1955
  - Dark Killer - launched 26 September 1956
  - Dark Rover - launched 30 August 1954
  - Dark Scout - launched 20 March 1958
- Harbour Defence Motor Launch designed for harbour defence but used in general escort and patrol roles.
- Ford-class seaward defence boats
  - Shalford
  - Aberford
  - Axford
  - Beckford
  - Brayford
  - Bryansford
  - Camberford
  - Desford
  - Greatford
  - Gifford
  - Droxford
  - Mayford
  - Hinksford
  - Ickford
  - Dubford
  - Glassford
  - Kingsford
  - Marlingford
  - Tilford
  - Montford
- Bold-class experimental gas-turbine powered attack craft
  - Bold Pathfinder (1951) - scrapped 1962
  - Bold Pioneer (1951) - scrapped 1958
- Ton-class Hong Kong patrol craft
  - Beachampton (1953)
  - Monkton (1956)
  - Wasperton (1956)
  - Wolverton (1957)
  - Yarnton (1956)
- Brave-class fast attack craft
  - Brave Swordsman (1959)
  - Brave Borderer (1960)
- Endurance ice patrol ship (converted 1968)
- Tenacity fast patrol craft (1973)
- Scimitar-class fast training craft
  - Scimitar (1970)
  - Cutlass (1970)
  - Sabre (1971)
- Bird-class large patrol craft
  - Kingfisher (1975)
  - Cygnet (1976)
  - Peterel (1977)
  - Sandpiper (1977)
  - Redpole (1985)
- Small Bird-class patrol craft
  - Cormorant - commissioned 1985
  - Hart - commissioned 1985
- Jura (1972) offshore patrol craft
- Island-class offshore patrol craft
  - Jersey (1976)
  - Guernsey (1977)
  - Shetland (1977)
  - Orkney (1977)
  - Lindisfarne (1978)
  - Anglesey (1979)
  - Alderney (1979)
- Castle-class offshore patrol craft
  - Leeds Castle (1981)
  - Dumbarton Castle (1982)
- Attacker-class patrol and training boat
  - Attacker (1983) to Lebanon 1992 as Trablous
  - Chaser (1983) to Lebanon 1992 as Jbeil
  - Fencer (1983) to Lebanon 1992 as Jounieh
  - Hunter (1983) to Lebanon 1992 as Saida
  - Striker (1983) to Lebanon 1992 as Arz
- Falkland Island patrol craft
  - Protector (1983)
  - Guardian (1983)
  - Sentinel (1984)
- Peacock-class Hong Kong patrol craft
  - Swallow (1984) to Ireland 1988 as Ciara
  - Swift (1984) to Ireland 1988 as Orla
  - Starling (1984) to Philippines 1997 as Artemio Ricarte
  - Peacock (1984) to Philippines 1997 as Emilio Jacinto
  - Plover (1984) to Philippines 1997 as Apolinario Mabini
