= HMS Northumberland (F238) =

1994 Type 23 or Duke-class frigate of the Royal Navy

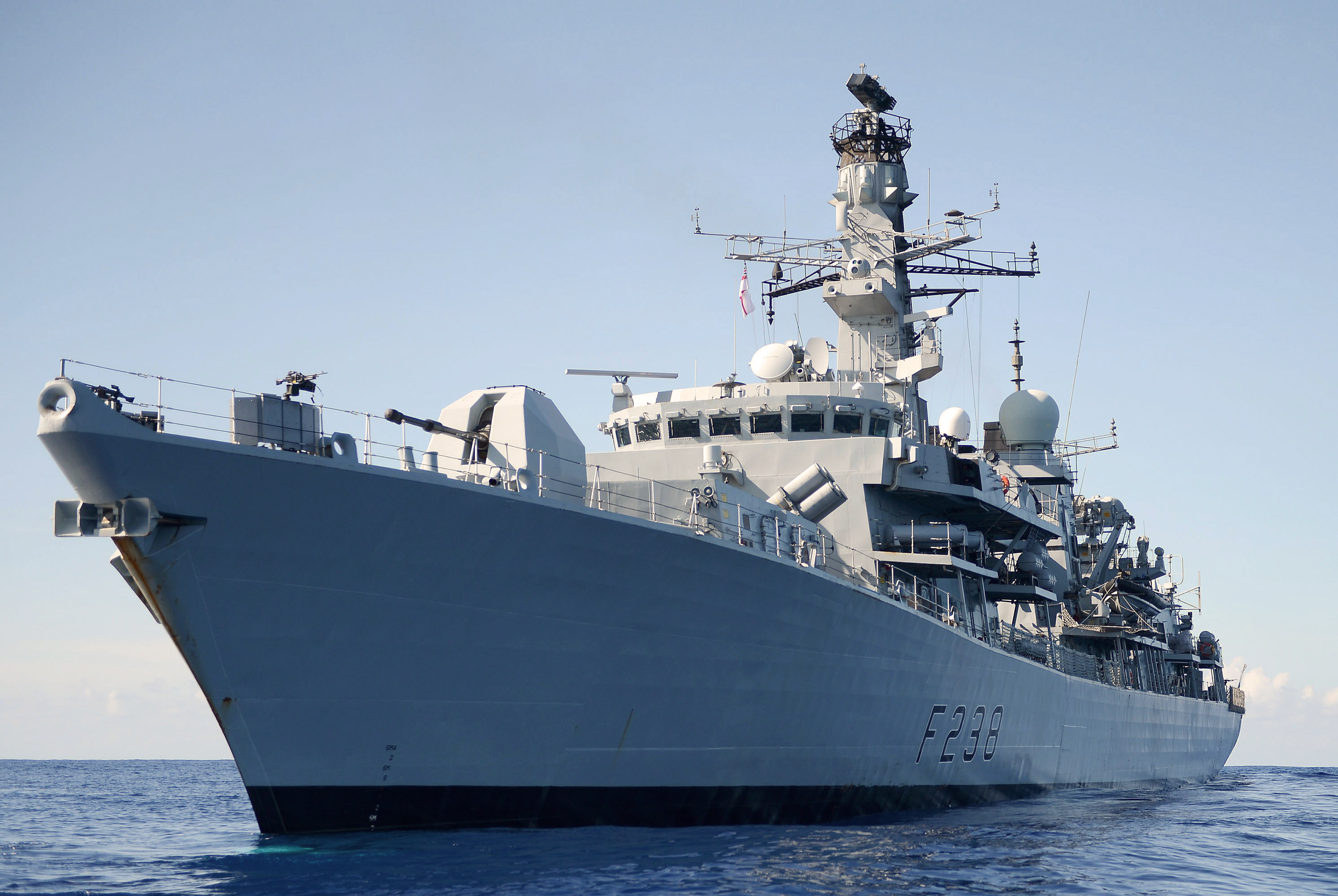
- HMS Northumberland, 2012

History

United Kingdom
- Name: HMS Northumberland
- Operator: Royal Navy
- Ordered: December 1989
- Builder: Swan Hunter, Tyne and Wear, United Kingdom
- Laid down: 4 April 1991
- Launched: 4 April 1992
- Sponsored by: Lady Anne Kerr
- Commissioned: 29 September 1994
- Decommissioned: 12 March 2025
- Refit: LIFEX 2016–2018
- Home port: HMNB Devonport
- Identification: IMO number: 8949666; MMSI number: 234621000; Callsign: GCOH; Pennant number: F238
- Motto: Fortiter defendit triumphans; ("Triumphing by brave defence")
- Honours and awards: Barfleur 1692; Vigo 1702; Louisberg 1758; Quebec 1759; Egypt 1801; San Domingo 1806; Groix Island 1812; Egypt 1882
- Fate: Scrapped 2026
- Badge

General characteristics
- Class & type: Type 23 frigate
- Displacement: 4,900 t (4,800 long tons; 5,400 short tons)
- Length: 133 m (436 ft 4 in)
- Beam: 16.1 m (52 ft 10 in)
- Draught: 7.3 m (23 ft 11 in)
- Propulsion: CODLAG: Four 1510 kW (2,025 shp) Paxman Valenta 12CM diesel generators; Two GEC electric motors delivering 2980kW (4000 shp); Two Rolls-Royce Spey SM1C delivering 23,190 kW (31,100 shp)
- Speed: In excess of 28 kn (52 km/h; 32 mph)
- Range: 7,500 nautical miles (14,000 km) at 15 kn (28 km/h)
- Complement: 185 (accommodation for up to 205)
- Electronic warfare & decoys: UAF-1 ESM, or, UAT Mod 1; Seagnat; Type 182 towed torpedo decoy; Surface Ship Torpedo Defence
- Armament: Anti-air missiles: 1 × 32-cell GWS 35 Vertical Launching System (VLS) for: 32 × Sea Ceptor missiles (1–25+ km); Anti-ship missiles: 2 × quad Harpoon Block 1C (originally fit, retired 2023); Anti-submarine torpedoes: 2 × twin 12.75 in (324 mm) Sting Ray torpedo tubes; Guns: 1 × BAE 4.5 inch Mk 8 naval gun; 2 × 30 mm DS30M Mk2 guns, or, 2 × 30 mm DS30B guns; 2 × Miniguns; 4 × General-purpose machine gun
- Aircraft carried: 1 × Wildcat HMA2, armed with: 2 × Sting Ray anti-submarine torpedoes, or; 20 × Martlet multirole missiles (from 2021); Mk 11 depth charges; or; 1 × Westland Merlin HM2, armed with; 4 × anti submarine torpedoes
- Aviation facilities: Flight deck; Enclosed hangar

HMS Northumberland was a Type 23 frigate of the Royal Navy. She was named after the Duke of Northumberland. She was the eighth Royal Navy ship to bear the name since the first 70-gun ship of the line in 1679, and the ninth in the class of Type 23 frigates. She was based at Devonport and was part of the Devonport Flotilla.

On 20 November 2024 Secretary of State for Defence, John Healey, announced the ship would be decommissioned stating the ship's condition was "uneconomical to repair."

== Service history ==
=== Construction ===
Northumberland is one of four Type 23 frigates built by Swan Hunter on the Tyne at Wallsend. She was launched by her sponsor Lady Kerr, wife of Admiral Sir John Kerr, the former Commander-in-Chief Naval Home Command, in April 1992 and was accepted into Royal Naval Service in May 1994.

=== 1994–2000 ===
After sea trials and going through F.O.S.T. Northumberland was deployed to the Falklands. During her passage, Northumberland had to divert into rough weather to effect the rescue of a fishing trawler; during the diversion the ship allegedly struck a whale; although the damage was actually caused by the vessel "slamming" in high seas at speed whilst proceeding to the rescue. At Tenerife, after dropping off the rescued fishermen, the bow dome began to leak; this continued during her resumed voyage to the Falkland Islands. Northumberland took up station at South Georgia undertaking fishery protection duties; when this was complete a dry dock was found in Rio de Janeiro that was suitable to carry out a bow dome change. Once better weather arrived she sailed to Brazil to be put into dry dock. She was escorted in by two ex-Royal Navy Type 22 frigates. Once in the dry dock, repairs took three weeks at a cost of £3 million.

Deploying to the Caribbean in 1999 for counter narcotics and disaster relief duties, Northumberland seized over two tonnes of cocaine (with a street-value of £135 million), in cooperation with a United States Coast Guard law enforcement detachment.

=== 2001–2010 ===
From July 2004 to July 2005, Northumberland underwent an extensive refit at Number 1 Dock (Inner) at Babcock's dockyard in Rosyth, her first refit since build. This refit saw her equipped with an updated suite of weapons and sensors (including a modified 4.5" Gun and the latest Low Frequency Active Sonar) and of propulsion and mechanical systems. Improvements were also made to the living quarters and a state of the art galley to feed the Ship's Company. Also replaced were corroded areas of the flight deck. Improvements were made to the lighting system used during night landings and a new helicopter handling system to move a 13-ton Merlin helicopter safely in and out of the hangar was installed. (Although the Type 23 was originally designed to operate the Merlin, Northumberland had previously only hosted the much smaller Lynx.) The combination of 2087 LFAS and Merlin ASW helicopter has subsequently proved highly effective and the class is widely regarded as the most capable anti-submarine frigate afloat.

Northumberland rejoined the fleet at the Trafalgar 200 celebrations, then embarked for a period of sea training, starting with BOST (Basic Operational Sea Training) in January 2006, straight after the Christmas leave period. For a time during 2006 Northumberland accompanied the submarine HMS Torbay on her deployment to the US AUTEC (Acoustic Undersea Testing and Evaluation Centre) which is based on Andros Island in the Bahamas. In 2007 she deployed to the Mediterranean as part of the UK's contribution to NATO maritime forces.

In 2008, Northumberland deployed to the Indian Ocean as the first RN warship to participate in the EU's counter piracy Operation Atalanta, conducting numerous counter-piracy patrols in the Gulf of Aden and escorting World Food Programme humanitarian shipping between Mombasa and Mogadishu; this was partially documented in the Sky TV programme Ross Kemp in Search of Pirates.

She deployed to the Indian Ocean again in 2010 for an eight-month counter-piracy patrol as part of the international naval counter-piracy task force, TF 151 and conducted numerous operations to disrupt piracy activity in the Gulf of Aden and the eastern Somali coast.

Northumberland returned to the UK at the end of 2010 to prepare to enter refit in 2011.

=== 2011–2020 ===
As part of an extensive refit at the beginning of 2011, Northumberland received several significant technology upgrades. The Sea Wolf point defence missile system was upgraded with the Sea Wolf Mid-Life Update (SWMLU – aka "swimloo") which substantially improved the range, performance and reliability of the system. The combat system was upgraded from outfit DNA to DNA2, replacing the combat system architecture to improve redundancy and system performance, and a software upgrade which significantly improves overall functionality and sensor integration, as well as providing MMI convergence with the Type 45 destroyer's command system. The two 30mm BMARC cannons were replaced by two 30mm Automated Small Calibre Gun (ASCG) mountings. These allow remote control of the mount via operator consoles and integrated Electro Optic fire control. Additional modifications improved habitability and reliability in high ambient temperatures.

Emerging from refit in the summer of 2011, Northumberland completed her sea trials and weapon acceptance programme, conducting eight weeks of Basic Operational Sea Training (BOST) in early 2012. She deployed back to the Indian Ocean in the Autumn of 2012 for counter-piracy and counter-narcotics tasking. This included the successful capture and destruction of over £5M of cannabis resin from a smuggler in the Arabian Sea. She returned to the UK in May 2013.

Northumberland participated in Exercise Joint Warrior 2013.

The ship joined the COUGAR 14 Response Force Task Group deployment for exercises in the Mediterranean and Gulf regions.

Northumberland eventually returned to Devonport on 5 December 2014 after a deployment which included visits to Gibraltar, Souda Bay in Crete, Bahrain, Dubai and Fujairah in the United Arab Emirates, Mumbai in India, Muscat in Oman, Malta and Lisbon.

On 9 May 2015, Northumberland was present in St Peter Port for the commemorations marking the 70th anniversary of Guernsey's Liberation. A month later, Northumberland moored off Cowes in company with HM Ships Ranger and Smiter to mark the 200th anniversary of the Royal Yacht Squadron. Celebrations began with a reception and capability demonstration onboard hosted by the Second Sea Lord. Guests included the Duke of Edinburgh, as Admiral of the Royal Yacht Squadron, and foreign royals including King Harald of Norway, Juan Carlos, the former king of Spain and Prince Henrik of Denmark.

Later in June 2015, Northumberland played a key role in the Waterloo 200 celebrations by carrying the New Waterloo Dispatch letter across the English Channel from Ostend to Broadstairs as part of an elaborate re-enactment retracing the route of HMS Peruvian, the naval sloop which carried the original letter that brought the news of the victory of the Battle of Waterloo back to England in 1815.

In 2016, during preparations for entering refit in Devonport, Northumberland hosted the semi-final stage of the BBC series Masterchef. As part of her re-fit, she was upgraded with Sea Ceptor surface-to-air missiles and returned to sea in 2018

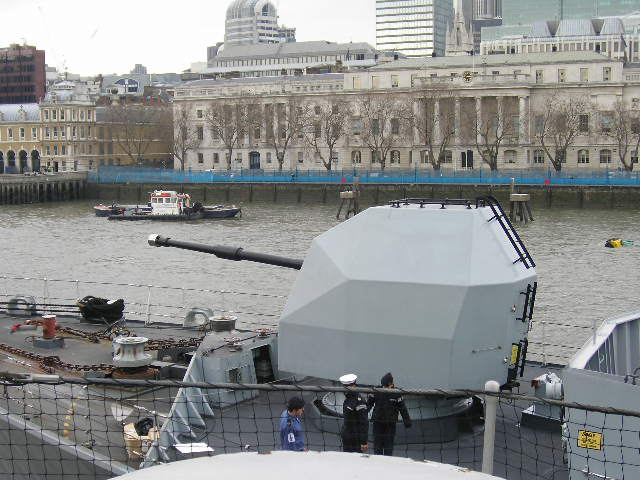
Northumberland's 4.5-inch Mk 8 Mod 1 "Kryten" naval gun designed to reduce radar cross section

In late 2020, with a television crew filming on board, a Russian submarine being tracked in the North Atlantic hit Northumberland's towed sonar, requiring the frigate to abort the 48-hour mission to find the submarine and return to port to replace the sonar. The Ministry of Defence does not normally comment on such incidents, but this one was caught on camera.

In December 2020, during the COVID-19 pandemic, Northumberland returned to Devonport after a number of suspected COVID-19 cases had been discovered on board. The ship was previously tasked with patrolling UK waters over the festive period but returned to Devonport so that the crew could isolate, in accordance with health guidelines. The Royal Navy stated that the ship would still continue to meet its operational tasks over Christmas.

=== 2021-2026 ===
In June 2021, Northumberland, along with Tamar and Tyne, was deployed off the Cornish coast to provide security for the 2021 G7 summit.

In 2022, Northumberland spent 191 days at sea.

During the July 2023 and July 2024 visits of USS Tennessee (SSBN-734) to HMNB Clyde, Northumberland was seen escorting the U.S. Submarine during its surface transits.

In mid-2024, unconfirmed reports suggested that, on starting her upkeep period, Northumberland had been found to be "beyond economical repair" and that she might therefore not return to service.

On 20 November 2024, Defence Secretary John Healey announced that due to structural damage discovered during her refit Northumberland was uneconomical to repair and would be retired from the fleet by March 2025.

In August 2026, the governmeng announced the sale for scrapping of the Northumberland at the Aliağa Ship Breaking Yard, in Turkey, where it was beached on September 29, having sailed from Portsmouth on September 10, being towed by the greek tugboat Protug 87.

== Affiliations ==
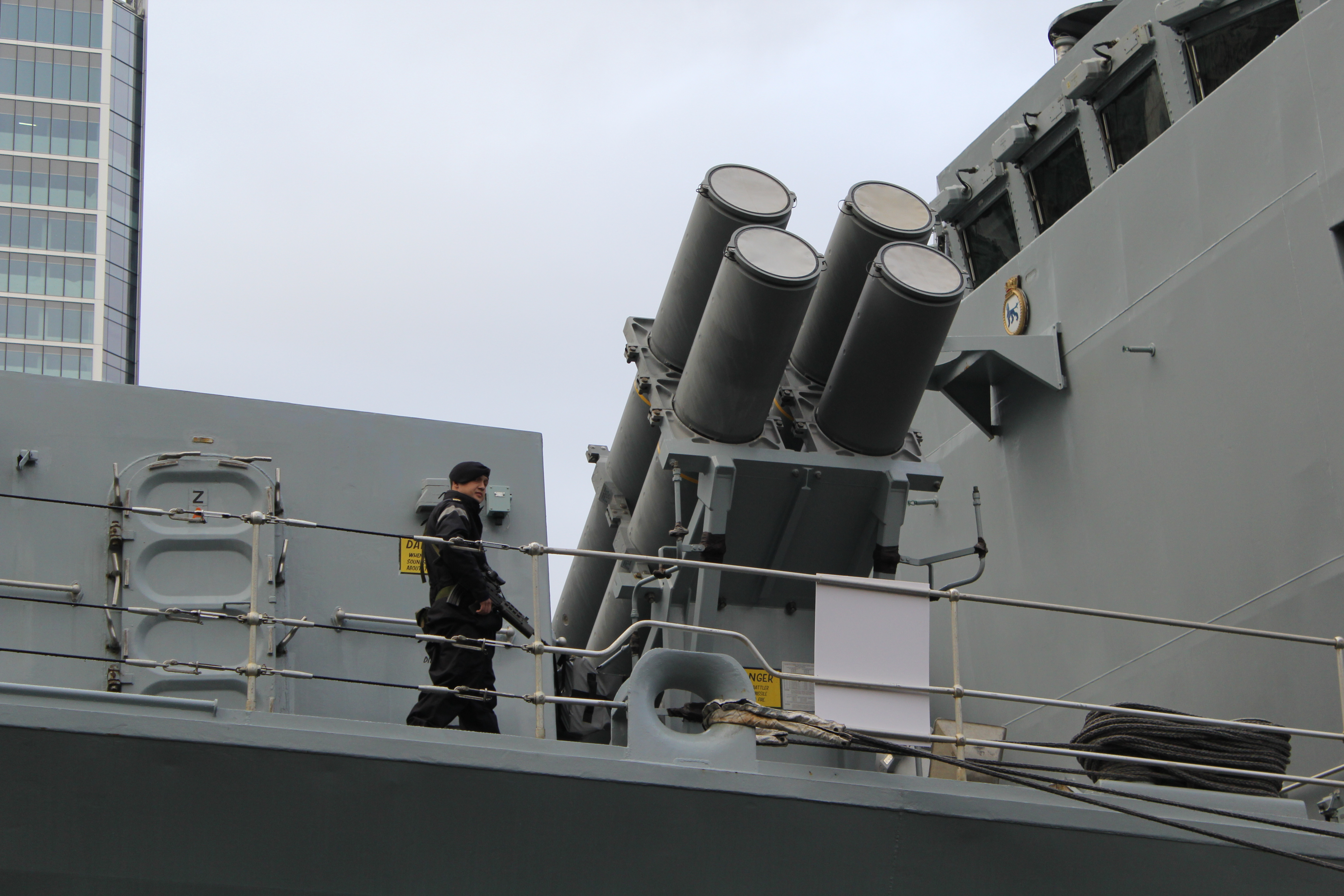
Harpoon anti-ship missile launchers aboard Northumberland

She is affiliated to numerous organisations:

- Northumberland County Council
- HMS Example and the Northumbrian Universities Royal Naval Unit
- The Light Dragoons
- The Royal Regiment of Fusiliers
- The 5th Battalion, the Royal Regiment of Fusiliers
- The Sir James Knott Trust
- The Worshipful Company of Bowyers
- The Worshipful Company of Carmen of the City of London (1517)
- The Bank of England's North Eastern Regional Agency
- The Calvert Trust
- Hexham Abbey
- RAF Boulmer
- The Copthorne Hotel, Newcastle upon Tyne
- Spirit of Northumberland, the RNLI Tynemouth Lifeboat
- TS Tenacity SCC
- The Morpeth Pipe Band (whose pipers regularly pipe the Ship in and out of Devonport when deploying or returning)
- TS Dreadnought (Greenwich, Deptford & Rotherhithe Sea Cadets)
- Dame Alice Harpur School, Bedford High School and Bedford School
- Solihull School CCF

In honouring these affiliations, she regularly visited Tyneside (most recently in January 2024) and occasionally, London, mooring alongside HMS Belfast in April 2007 as part of the 200th anniversary of the Slave Trade Act 1807. On that visit she was open to the public with a display on modern anti-slaving operations in which she and other ships of the Royal Navy take part. She also previously visited Baltimore in June 2006, Marmaris in Turkey in February 2003 and in October 2001 attended an Australian Fleet Review in Sydney.
