= HMS Calliope (shore establishment) =

Royal Naval Reserve unit in Tyne and Wear, England

Coordinates: 54.9686°N 1.6013°W

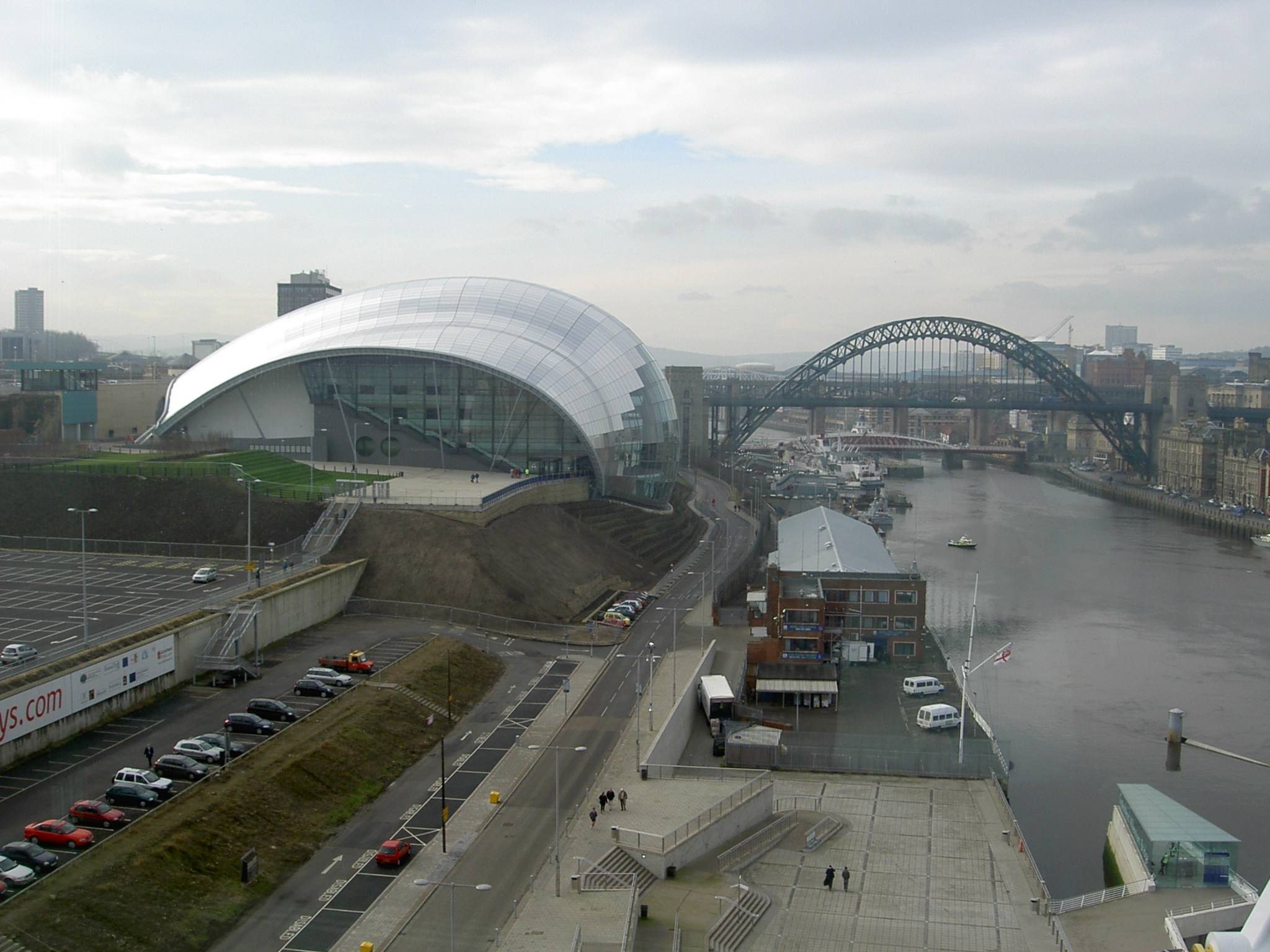
- HMS Calliope, to the right on the river bank

History

United Kingdom
- Name: HMS Calliope
- Commissioned: 1905
- Status: Currently operational
- Badge

General characteristics
- Class & type: Stone frigate

HMS Calliope is a training centre and 'stone frigate' of the Royal Naval Reserve, located in Gateshead, Tyne and Wear.

== History ==
A Tyne-based division of the Royal Naval Reserve was established in 1905, and used the old Calypso-class third-class cruiser HMS Calliope as its drill ship. She served until 1951, when she was sold for scrapping, and was replaced by the Shoreham-class sloop HMS Falmouth. Falmouth was renamed Calliope, and was berthed at Elswick. She served until 1968, when she too was sold for scrapping, after the Tyne Division moved ashore to a new headquarters, which retained the name HMS Calliope. In October 1985 it was awarded a place on the Roll of Honorary Freeman of the City of Newcastle.

== Present day ==
Located next to the Gateshead Millennium Bridge HMS Calliope is the principal training centre for the North and North East of England, and serves as the home base for some 150 reservists. Members take part in local representational activities and Remembrance Day parades in Newcastle and Gateshead. A number of tenders have been assigned to the unit over the years, including the River-class minesweeper HMS Orwell and the Archer-class patrol vessel HMS Example.

== Affiliated units ==
- Royal Marine Reserve (RMR) Scotland – RMR Tyne (Detachment)
- University Royal Naval Unit Northumbrian, serving the universities of Newcastle, Northumbria, Durham and Sunderland
- Newcastle Armed Forces Career Service
- Trojan Squadron of the Defence Technical Undergraduate Scheme
- Durham School CCF
- Royal Grammar School, Newcastle

== See also ==
- British Armed Forces
- List of Royal Navy shore establishments
