= HMS Puncher (P291) =

1988 Archer-class patrol and training vessel

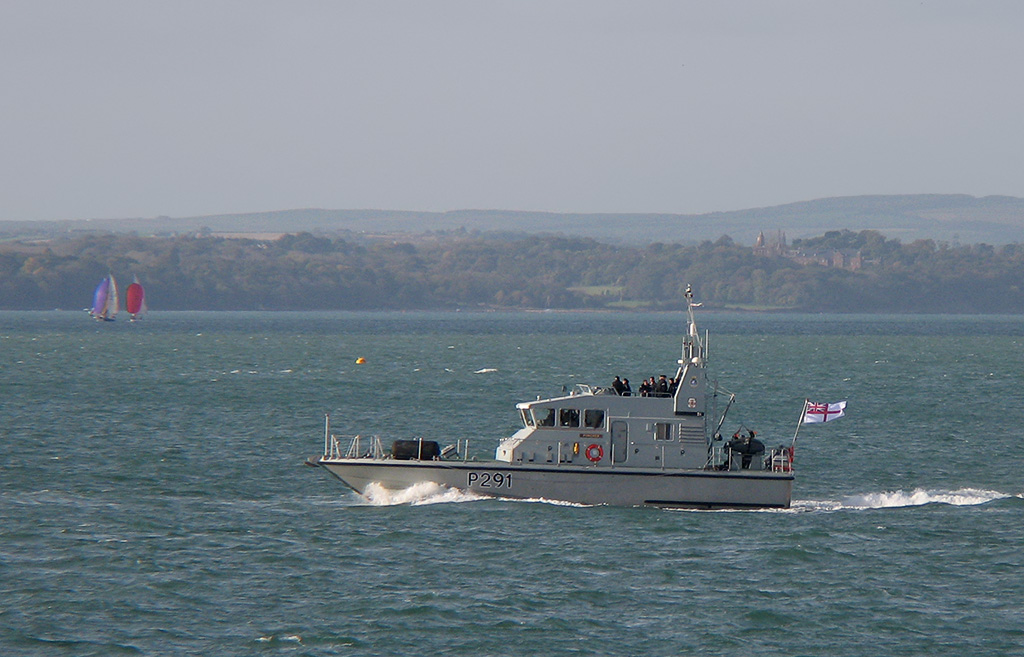
- HMS Puncher at Portsmouth, 2008

History

United Kingdom
- Name: HMS Puncher
- Operator: Royal Navy
- Builder: Vosper Thornycroft
- Completed: 1988
- Home port: HMNB Portsmouth
- Identification: MMSI number: 232002940; Callsign: GAAW
- Motto: "Never give in"
- Nickname(s): "The Mighty Puncher"
- Honours and awards: Battle of the Atlantic
- Status: In active service
- Badge

General characteristics
- Class & type: Archer-class patrol vessel
- Displacement: 54 tonnes
- Length: 20.8 m (68 ft)
- Beam: 5.8 m (19 ft)
- Draught: 1.8 m (5 ft 11 in)
- Propulsion: 2 shafts, Rolls-Royce M800T diesels, 1,590 bhp
- Speed: 14 kn (26 km/h); 45 kn (83 km/h) (Hull design, but limited due to engine fitted)
- Range: 550 nmi (1,020 km)
- Complement: 18 (training) (Note: 5 ship's company, 1 training officer, 12 URNU students.); 12 (operational)
- Sensors & processing systems: Decca 1216 navigation radar
- Armament: 1 × Oerlikon 20 mm cannon on fo'c'sle ("for but not with"); 3 × General purpose machine guns (Note: When operational and not in URNU role.)

HMS Puncher is an Archer-class patrol vessel of the Royal Navy. She is permanently based at HMNB Portsmouth and forms part of the First Patrol Boat Squadron (1PBS). Puncher is primarily tasked with training the officer cadets and midshipmen of the University of London's University Royal Naval Unit (London URNU). She also provides a training platform for young officers undertaking training during the Royal Navy's initial warfare officers' course, and has also been used in the coastal protection role, most notably during Operation Olympic, the security operation surrounding the London 2012 Olympic Games.

== Deployments ==
Puncher operates from HMNB Portsmouth conducting navigation training in and around the Solent. She also regularly deploys out of area, often in the company of other P2000s, with the task of providing practical navigation and seamanship training to the ship's students. Recent deployments have included the Baltic and Northern Europe. Puncher attended Kieler Woche ("Kiel Week") in 2011 with her sister ship Express and ships from several navies.

As of the 2020s, 14 of the Navy's 16 Archer-class vessels are assigned to the inshore division of the Coastal Forces Squadron. In this capacity, they can be assigned deployments further afield. In June 2024, Puncher and her sister ship HMS Pursuer, embarked personnel from the Navy's the Mine and Threat Exploitation Group and deployed for exercises in the Baltic Sea. The vessels operated an IVER 3 autonomous vehicle and a Video Ray Defender remotely operated vehicle to find mines on the seabed.

== Ship's company ==
Puncher has a permanent crew of five regular Royal Navy personnel, one officer and four ratings, who fulfil the minimum necessary seagoing complement of the vessel. The ship's company is also regularly boosted by up to 12 (more typically 10) URNU officer cadets and midshipmen who are normally accompanied by a Royal Naval Reserve training officer. Alternately the berths may be used by any other personnel who are required to live aboard.

== Affiliations ==
Like most Royal Navy ships, Puncher is affiliated with various organisations and a port:

- HMS Westminster
- 702 Naval Air Squadron
- HMS Talent
- Kensington and Chelsea Borough Council
- Worshipful Company of Bakers
- Seafarers UK
- Little Ship Club
- Town of Eastbourne
- Eastbourne Sea Cadet Corps
- Eastbourne Lifeboat
- Royal Navy Old Comrades Club Eastbourne
