= HMS Explorer (P164) =

Archer-class patrol vessel of the Royal Navy

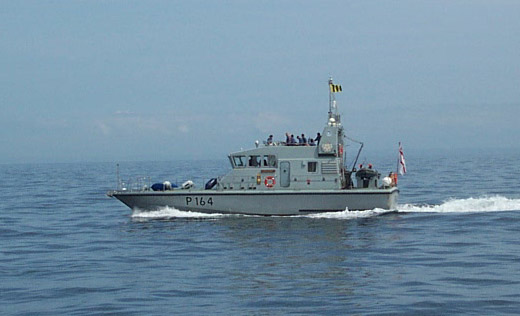
- HMS Explorer, 2004

History

United Kingdom
- Name: HMS Explorer
- Operator: Royal Navy
- Builder: Vosper Thornycroft
- Commissioned: 1986
- Reclassified: 1994
- Home port: Kingston-upon-Hull
- Identification: MMSI number: 235009910; Callsign: GABB; Pennant number: P164
- Status: In active service

General characteristics
- Class & type: Archer-class patrol vessel
- Displacement: 54 tonnes
- Length: 20.8 m (68 ft)
- Beam: 5.8 m (19 ft)
- Draught: 1.8 m (5 ft 11 in)
- Propulsion: 2 shafts, Cat C18 ACERT diesels, 873 bhp per shaft
- Speed: 22 kn (41 km/h); 45 kn (83 km/h) (Hull design, but limited due to engine fitted)
- Range: 550 nmi (1,020 km)
- Complement: 20 (training) (Note: 5 ship's company, 1 training officer, up to 14 URNU students.); 12 (operational)
- Sensors & processing systems: Decca 1216 navigation radar
- Armament: 1 × Oerlikon 20 mm cannon on fo'c'sle ("for but not with"); 3 × General purpose machine guns (Note: When operational and not in URNU role.)

HMS Explorer is an Archer-class P2000-type patrol and training vessel of the British Royal Navy. The ship is primarily assigned to the Yorkshire Universities Royal Naval Unit (URNU), serving the universities of Hull, Sheffield and Leeds. The ship is based in Kingston-Upon-Hull and mainly operates on the East coast of the UK, particularly in and around the Humber estuary.

HMS Explorer is the second ship to bear the name; her predecessor was an unarmed experimental Walter-turbine submarine based on the captured high test peroxide (HTP) powered German Type XVIIB submarine U-1407 launched in 1956 and scrapped in 1965.

== Construction ==
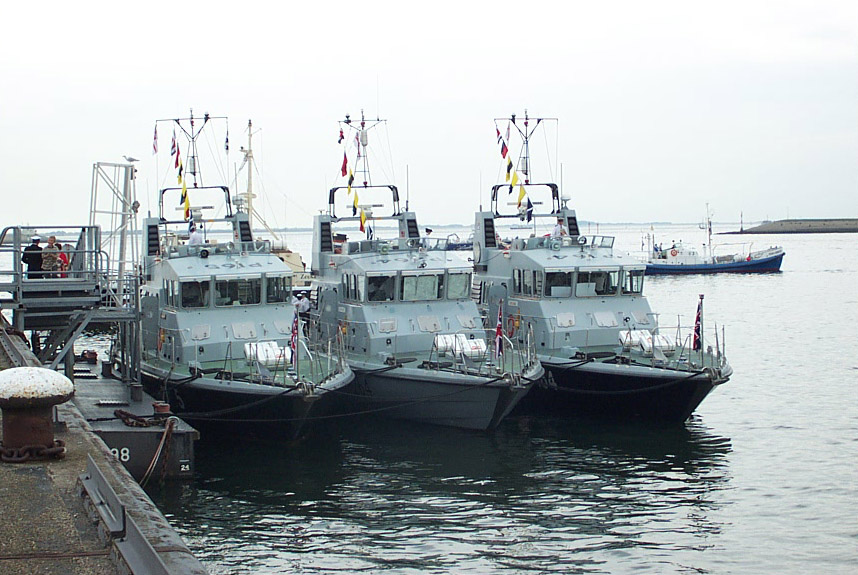
HMS Example and HMS Explorer seen either side of HMS Archer, demonstrating the distinctive black hull of the RNXS Example Class.

Explorer was built in 1986 by the now-defunct Watercraft Marine for the Royal Naval Auxiliary Service (RNXS) as an Example class tender, to the same design as the Royal Navy Archer class, as XSV Explorer. The Example class were distinguishable from their Royal Navy counterparts by their black painted hull until 2005, though they shared the same characteristics as them, being twin screw vessels constructed from moulded glass-reinforced plastic (GRP).

== Operational service ==
Explorer served for eight years as a RNXS tender with the pennant number A154 before being transferred to the Royal Navy upon the disbanding of the service in 1994. Upon joining the Naval service, the ship was assigned to the recently formed Yorkshire Universities Royal Navy Unit as its designated training vessel.

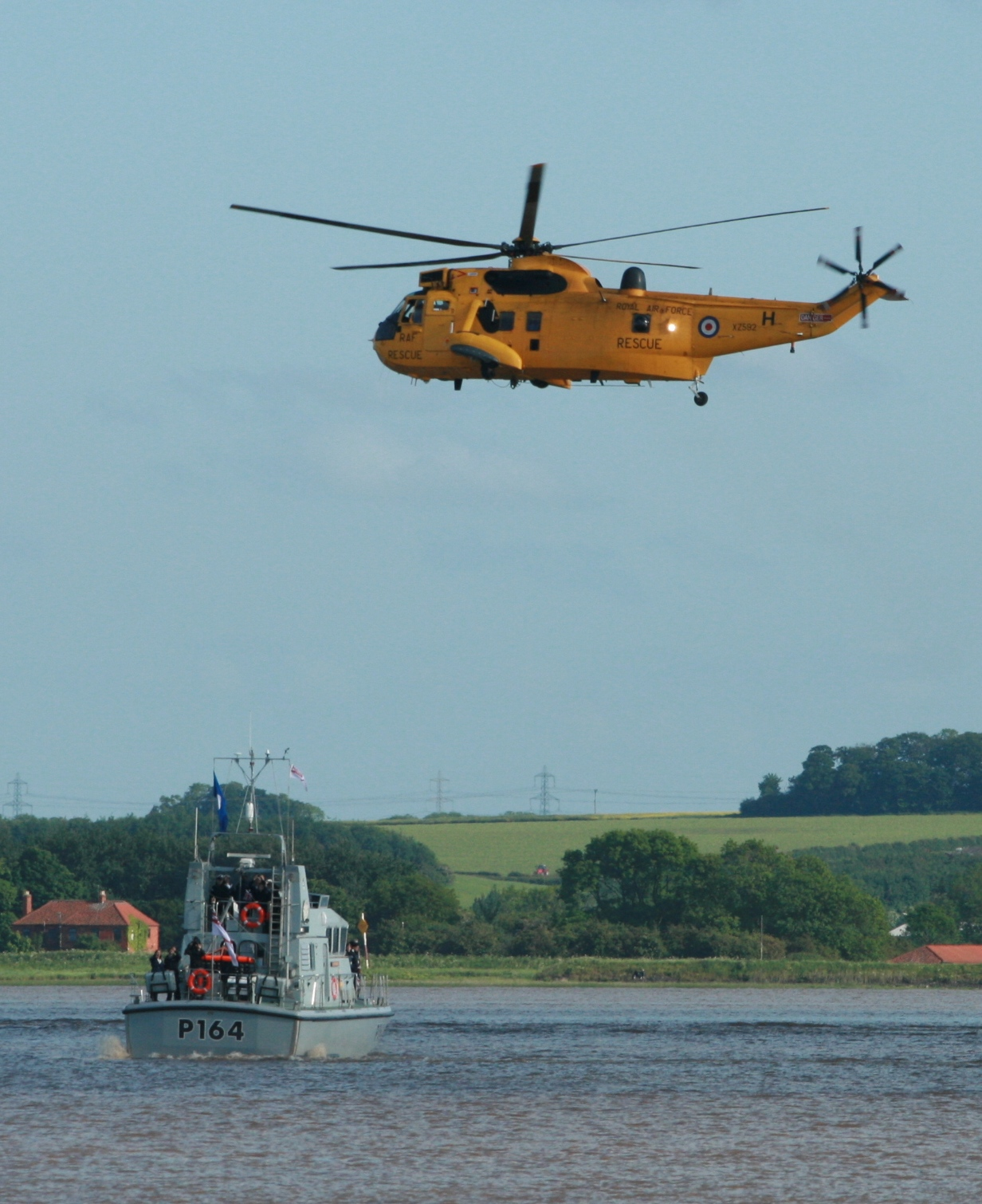
Westland Sea King helicopter and Explorer, at the celebrations of the Diamond Jubilee of Elizabeth II on 4 June 2012 at the Humber Bridge

The ship's primary role is undergraduate sea training in support of the units programme of navigational skills and seamanship training, and this is accomplished through designated 'sea weekends' as well as Easter and Summer deployments, during which the ship deploys for up to five weeks. During these deployments, the five person ship's company remain 'in theatre' while students are transported out to the ship's location. After receiving a significant engine upgrade in 2014, the ship's range was greatly enhanced and consequently in summer 2015 and 2016 Explorer has deployed to the Baltic Sea where the ship conducted a range of training and local engagements.

In addition to the ship's role as a training vessel, Explorer is also utilised by the Royal Navy for a range of ceremonial and other fleet tasking. The ship's comparatively small size is an asset in this regard, allowing the Royal Navy to "show the White Ensign in places that larger vessels cannot reach". Recent examples of this include regular cooperation with Humberside Police and Humberside Search and Rescue in the Humber, as well as ceremonial operations including providing transport for dignitaries including members of the royal family at the Battle of Jutland Centenary commemorations in June 2016, and acting as guard ship for the 2016 Sunderland Air Show. The ship also takes part in public engagement events in order to raise the profile of the Royal Navy and provide a Naval presence where tasking or size limitations make other ships unsuitable.

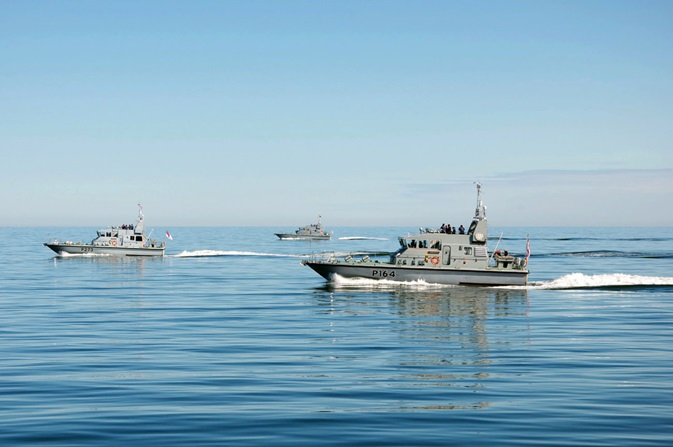
HMS Explorer in formation with HMS Biter, Pursuer, and Trumpeter on a summer deployment in the Baltic Sea, 2015 (Photo taken from HMS Trumpeter).

Explorer, along with the other 13 URNU-assigned Archer-class vessels, and, since 2020, the Scimitar class as well, is assigned to the Coastal Forces Squadron (CFS) Inshore Division (until May 2020 the Inshore Division was named the 1st Patrol Boat Squadron (1PBS)), under the command of Commander CFS. As such, they are assigned to the Portsmouth flotilla, although in practise most vessels are based elsewhere. Explorer is one of three P2000s whose home port is not a Royal Navy or Royal Navy Reserve establishment, along with HMS Express (Wales URNU) and HMS Trumpeter (Cambridge URNU) which are based in Penarth Marina, Cardiff, and Ipswich marina, respectively.
