= HMS Eaglet (shore establishment) =

Royal Naval Reserve unit in Liverpool, England

Coordinates: 53.3875°N 2.9812°W

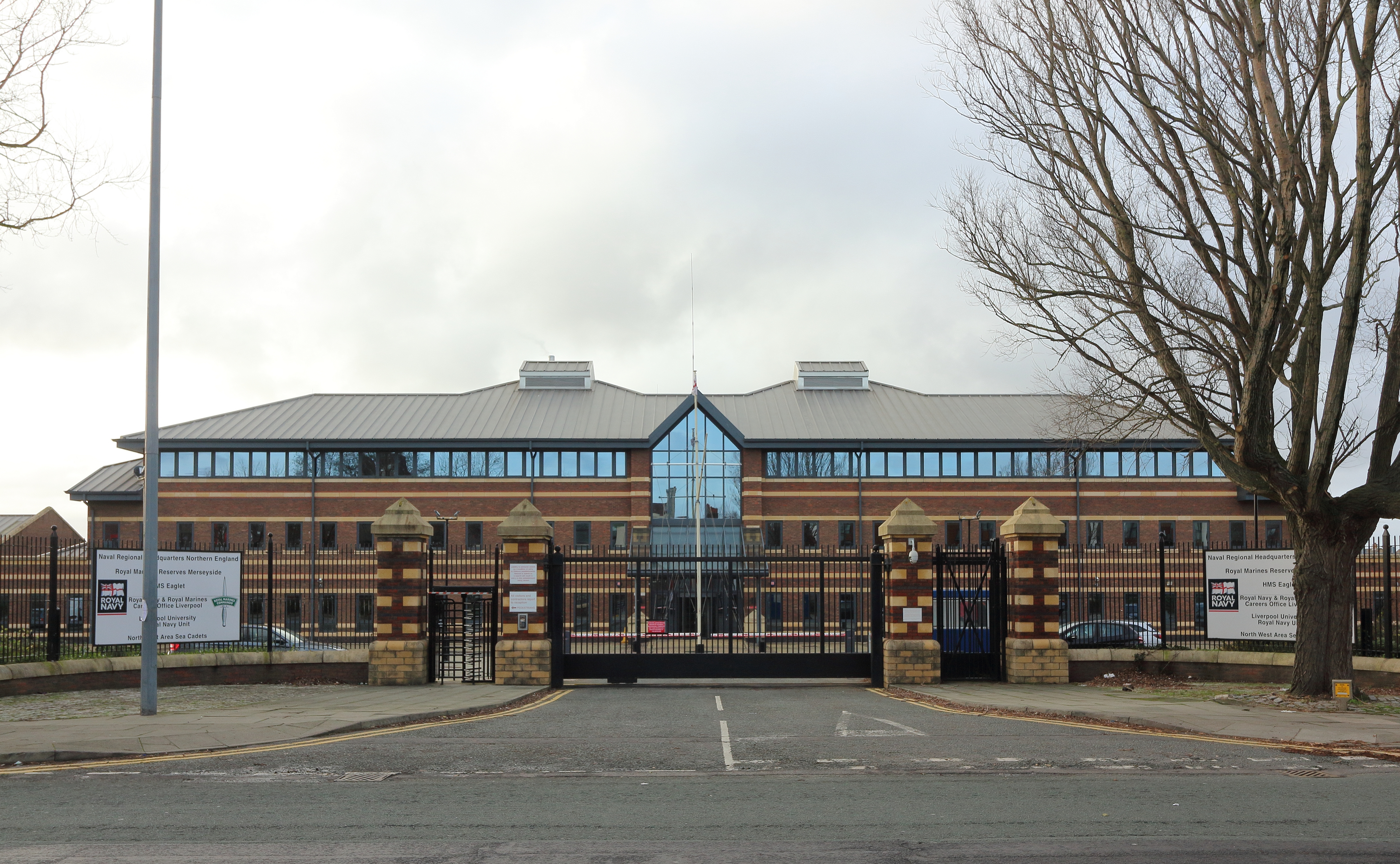

History

United Kingdom
- Name: HMS Eaglet
- Yard number: none
- Commissioned: 1904
- Status: Active
- Badge

General characteristics
- Class & type: Stone frigate

HMS Eaglet is a Royal Navy Reserve unit based in Liverpool. She is the main occupant of the Royal Navy Regional Headquarters in Liverpool, Merseyside. The base (often also colloquially referred to as HMS Eaglet) is also the home to a number of units, including: Royal Marines Reserve Merseyside, Naval Regional Command Northern England, Liverpool URNU, HMS Biter, HMS Charger, Sea Cadet Corps, and the Liverpool Royal Navy and Royal Marines Careers Office.

== History ==
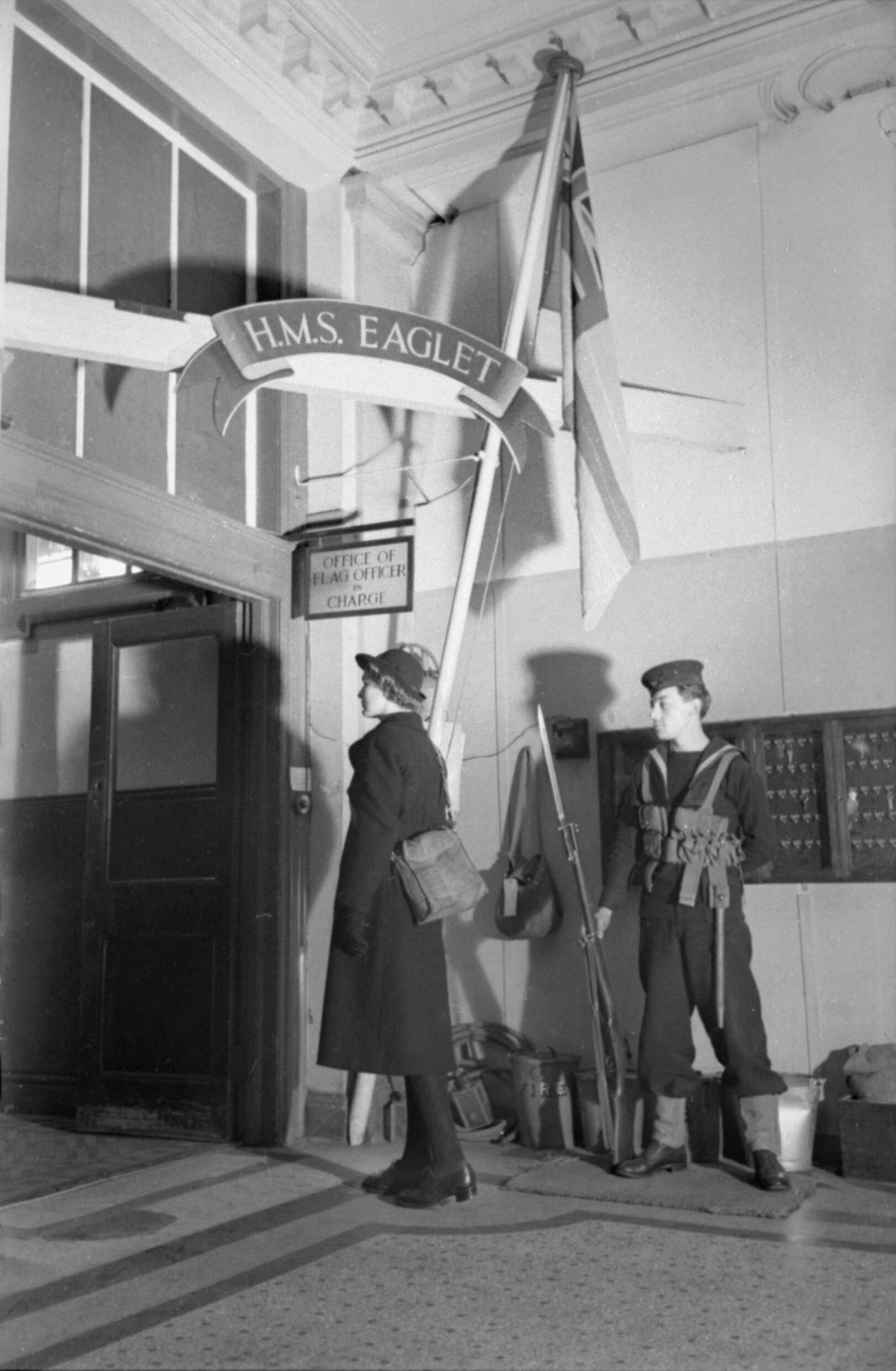
A Wren arrives at the entrance to Eaglet, 1942.

The Mersey Division of the RNVR was established in Customs House, Liverpool under the command of Edward Bootle-Wilbraham, 2nd Earl of Lathom in 1904, before moving to HMS Eagle (1804), a 50-gun frigate at Brunswick Dock, in 1911. Mersey Division was mobilised in 1914 to form part of the Royal Naval Division, serving at Gallipoli, the battles of Battle of Vimy Ridge, Passchendaele and Cambrai.

To avoid confusion with a newer HMS Eagle (1918), the frigate was renamed HMS Eaglet in 1918. The ship was destroyed in a fire in 1926, and replaced by the First World War 24-class sloop HMS Sir Bevis, which was renamed Eaglet. The new Eaglet was berthed at Salthouse Dock. During the Second World War, Eaglet became the flagship of Commander-in-Chief Western Approaches. In 1971, the sloop was scrapped and HMS Eaglet moved ashore to a new HQ at Prince's Dock. In 1993, Eaglet received the freedom of the city of Liverpool.

The current stone frigate is based on Brunswick Dock in Liverpool, opened by the Duke of Edinburgh in 1998.

== Current units ==
The following are based at the location:

- Headquarters, Naval Regional Command Northern England
  - Naval Regional Commander, Northern England and Isle of Man
- Headquarters, Royal Marine Reserve Merseyside
- Liverpool University Royal Naval Unit
- Archer-class patrol vessels:
  - HMS Biter (P270) – serving Manchester and Salford University Royal Naval Unit
  - HMS Charger (P292) – serving Liverpool University Royal Naval Unit

== Famous attendees ==
- Ian Edward Fraser, VC RNR
