= HMS Example =

Archer-class patrol vessel of the Royal Navy

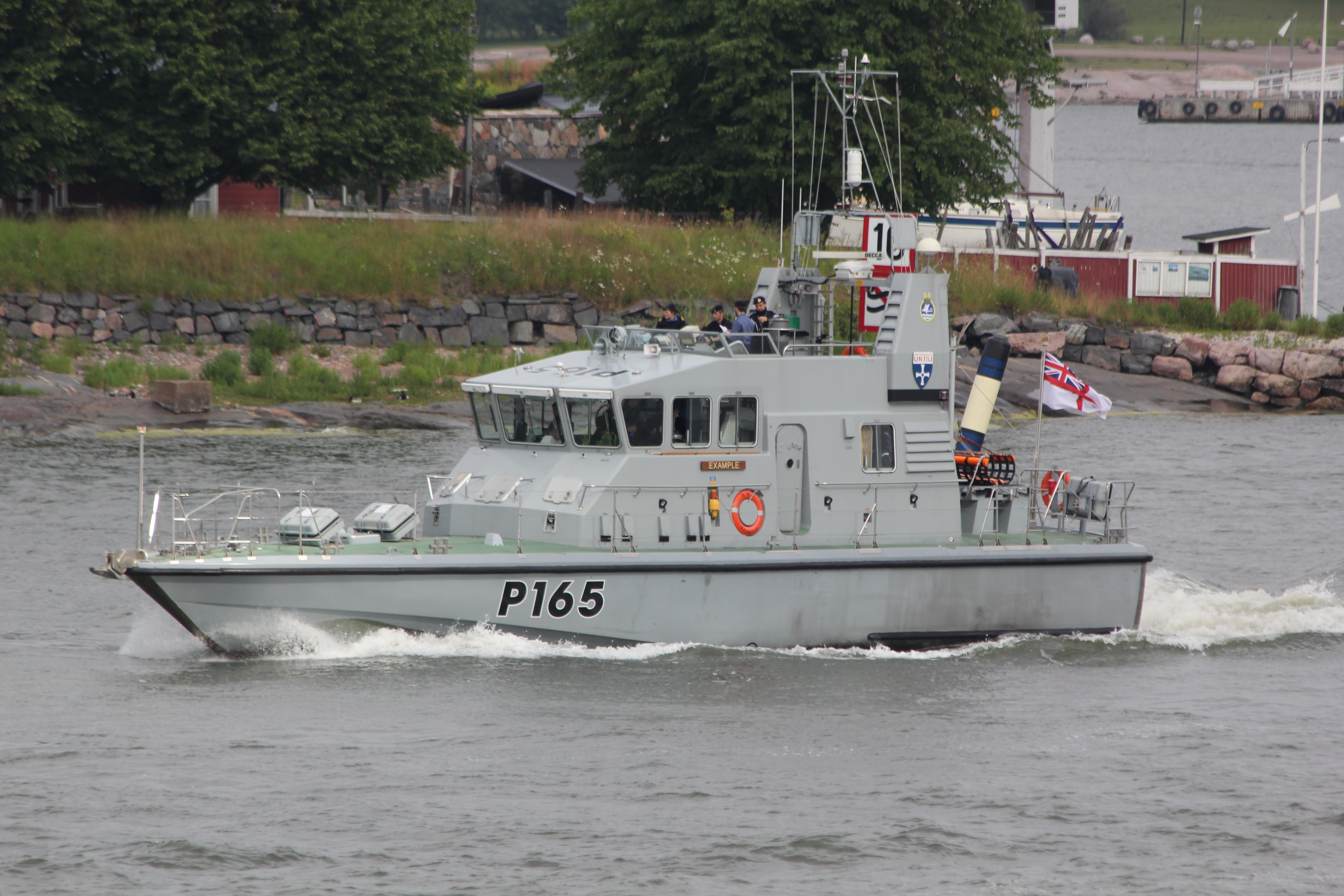
- HMS Example leaving Helsinki via the Särkänsalmi strait, 2012

History

United Kingdom
- Name: HMS Example
- Builder: Watercraft, Shoreham By Sea
- Launched: 1985
- Christened: XSV Example
- Acquired: 1994
- Commissioned: 1994
- Home port: 'Port of Tyne'
- Identification: MMSI number: 235009890; Callsign: GABA; Pennant number: P165
- Motto: Lead by Example
- Status: In active service

General characteristics
- Class & type: Archer-class patrol vessel
- Displacement: 54 tonnes
- Length: 20.8 m (68 ft 3 in)
- Beam: 5.8 m (19 ft 0 in)
- Height: 10.5 m (34 ft 5 in)
- Draught: 1.8 m (5 ft 11 in)
- Propulsion: 2 shafts, Rolls-Royce M800T diesels, 1,590 bhp (1,186 kW)
- Speed: 22 knots (41 km/h); 45 kn (83 km/h) (Hull design, but limited due to engine fitted)
- Range: 550 nmi (1,020 km)
- Complement: 18 (training) (Note: 5 ship's company, 1 training officer, 12 URNU students.); 12 (operational)
- Sensors & processing systems: Decca 1216 navigation radar
- Armament: 1 × Oerlikon 20 mm cannon on fo'c'sle ("for but not with"); 3 × General purpose machine guns (Note: When operational and not in URNU role.)

HMS Example is an Archer-class patrol and training vessel of the Royal Navy, based at HMS Calliope in Gateshead, England. Example was originally built for the Royal Naval Auxiliary Service, and was transferred to the Royal Navy when the RNXS disbanded in 1994. On transfer, she retained her name, and became the first ship in the Royal Navy to bear that name.

HMS Example is currently part of the Coastal Forces Squadron, formerly 1st Patrol Boat Squadron. The mission statement of the CFS is to "provide support to allow the conduct of safe and effective P2000 operations in support of the URNU sea-training syllabus"; URNU is acronym for University Royal Naval Unit. Example is attached to the Northumbrian URNU, is based at the shore establishment HMS Calliope in Gateshead, and has a crew of 5 (plus up to 12 students).

Example acts as a training ship for students at Durham, Newcastle, Northumbria, Teesside and Sunderland universities. The ship takes part in deployments over the university summer and Easter holidays, giving the students an opportunity to spend a longer amount of time living on board the ship and to experience larger scale naval operations with other URNUs.

== Operational history ==
Example was built by Watercraft Ltd of Shoreham by Sea and launched in 1985. She was initially delivered to the Royal Navy Auxiliary Service (RNXS) as an auxiliary service vessel with the pennant number A153. She was the lead vessel of a batch of four vessels known as the Example class, but was identical in design to the Archer class of patrol boats being simultaneously built for the Royal Navy.

Example and her sisters were transferred to the Royal Navy when the RNXS disbanded in 1994. She retained her existing name, but was reclassified as a patrol boat of the Archer class, and was given the new pennant number of P165.

The ship played a prominent role in the 2004 Entente Cordiale celebrations, and escorted HMS Endurance in the 2005 International Fleet Review. In summer 2006 the ship celebrated its 21st birthday with divisions at HMS Calliope with the salute taken by N Sherlock, Lord Lieutenant of Tyne and Wear. In 2008, Example took a prominent role in the Tyneside celebrations to mark the centenary of the Territorial Army centred on the Gateshead Millennium Bridge.

In 2012, in the company of sister ships Explorer, Ranger and Trumpeter, Example undertook a 12-week deployment visiting Belgium, the Netherlands and Germany before transiting the Kiel Canal and attending Kiel Week. The deployment continued to Stockholm, St Petersburg and Tallinn before returning to the UK.

In November 2016, Example rejoined the fleet after a prolonged refit during which she received new engines allowing the ship to reach speeds of up to 22 knots (41 km/h).

== See also ==
- University Royal Naval Unit
