= HMS Raider (P275) =

Archer-class patrol and training vessel

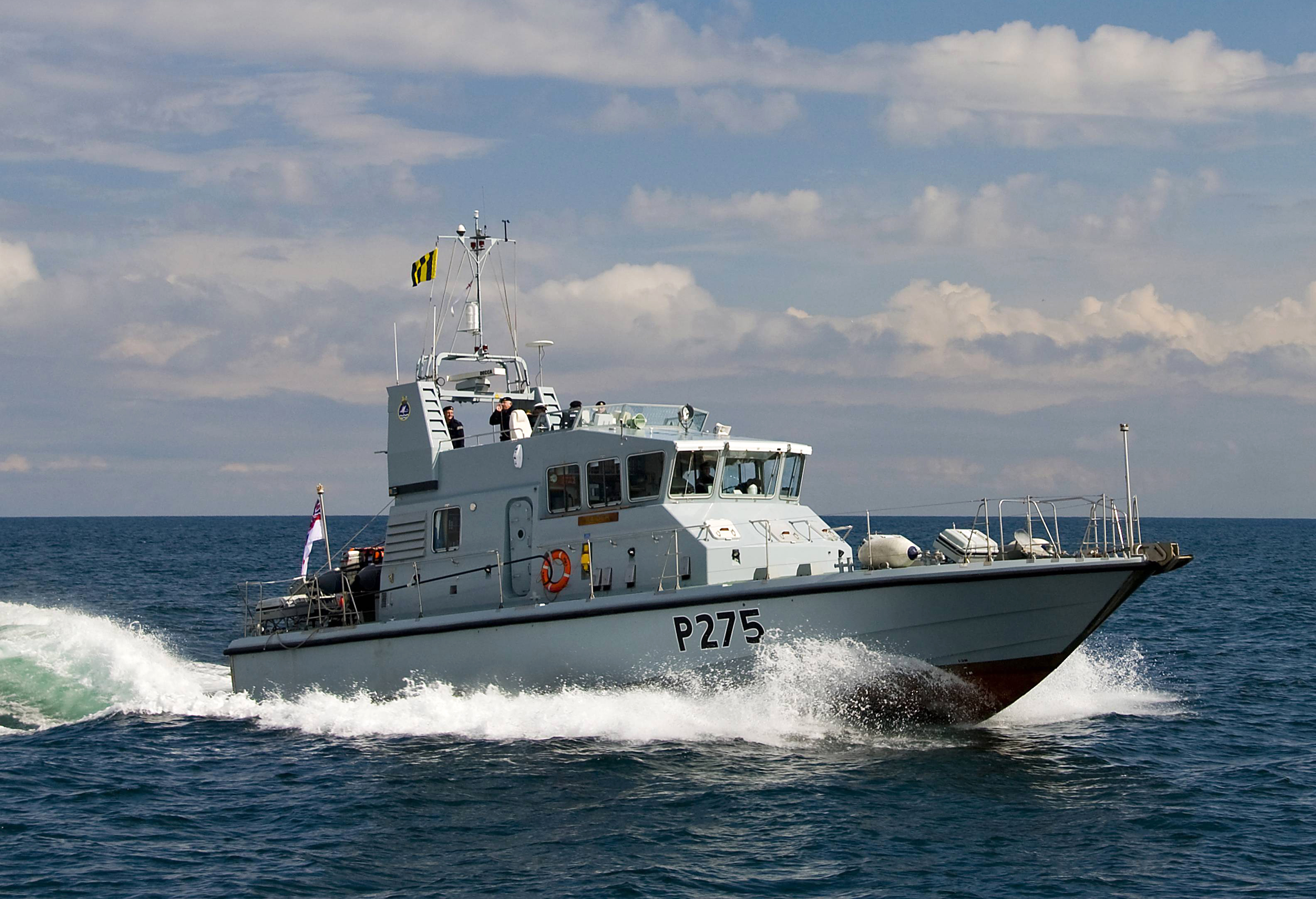
- HMS Raider in 2009

History

United Kingdom
- Name: HMS Raider
- Operator: Royal Navy
- Builder: Ailsa Shipbuilding Company
- Commissioned: January 1998
- Home port: HMNB Clyde
- Identification: MMSI number: 235009940; Callsign: GCUV; Pennant number: P275
- Status: In active service

General characteristics
- Class & type: Archer-class patrol vessel
- Displacement: 54 tonnes
- Length: 20.8 m (68 ft)
- Beam: 5.8 m (19 ft)
- Draught: 1.8 m (5 ft 11 in)
- Propulsion: 2 shafts, Rolls-Royce MTU V12 diesel engines
- Speed: 25 kn (46 km/h); 45 kn (83 km/h) (Hull design, but limited due to engine fitted)
- Range: 550 nmi (1,020 km)
- Complement: 12
- Sensors & processing systems: Decca 1216 navigation radar
- Armament: 1 × Oerlikon 20 mm cannon on fo'c'sle ("for but not with"); 3 × General purpose machine guns
- Armour: Ballistic protection fitted

HMS Raider is an Archer-class patrol and training vessel of the British Royal Navy. Along with HMS Tracker, Raider is part of the Faslane Patrol Boat Squadron based at HMNB Clyde.

== Characteristics ==
Raider is one of sixteen 20.8-metre (68 ft 3 in), 54-tonne P2000 patrol craft operated by the Royal Navy. She is constructed from glass-reinforced plastic. The hull was built by Kingfisher Boats of Falmouth, Cornwall. As a "batch 2" vessel, Raider has a sustainable top speed of 24 knots (44 km/h; 28 mph), 4 knots (7.4 km/h; 4.6 mph) faster than the earlier batch 1 vessels. Both Raider and Tracker operate in the force protection role, providing maritime security for high value shipping in the Firth of Clyde, and are armed with three general purpose machine guns.

== Service ==
Raider, formerly of Cambridge URNU, became Bristol URNU's training ship in Summer 2010, superseding HMS Trumpeter. In October 2012 she joined the Faslane Patrol Boat Squadron to replace HMS Dasher, which returned to Bristol URNU.
