= HMS Ranger (P293) =

Archer-class patrol and training vessel

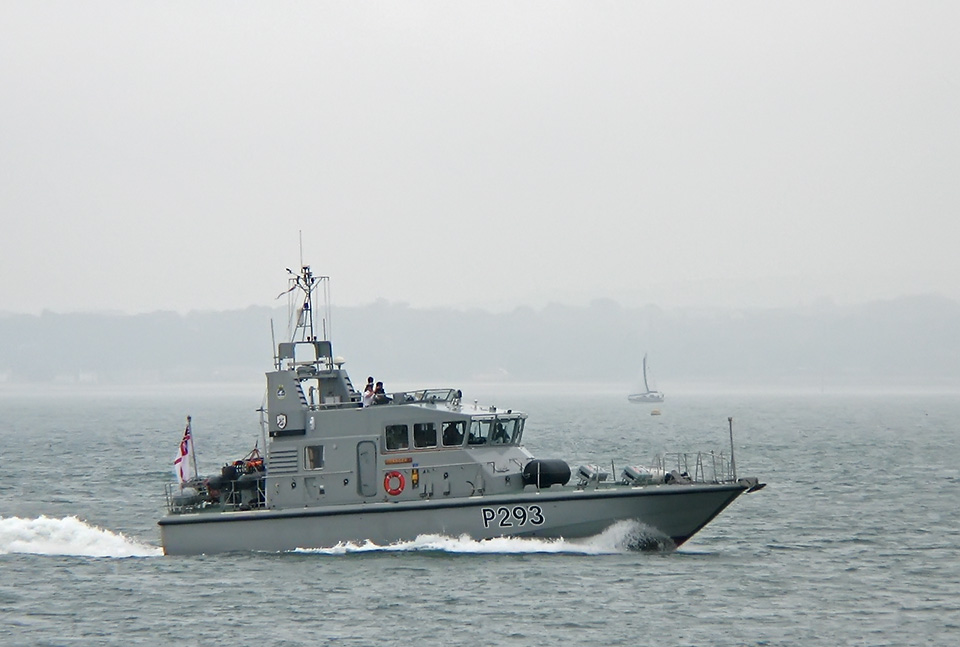
- HMS Ranger, 2007

History

United Kingdom
- Name: HMS Ranger
- Operator: Royal Navy
- Builder: Vosper Thornycroft
- Commissioned: 1988
- Home port: HMNB Portsmouth
- Identification: IMO number: 8937845; MMSI number: 232696000; Callsign: GAAY
- Motto: Range far to seek the foe
- Status: In active service

General characteristics
- Class & type: Archer-class patrol vessel
- Displacement: 54 tonnes
- Length: 20.8 m (68 ft 3 in)
- Beam: 5.8 m (19 ft 0 in)
- Draught: 1.8 m (5 ft 11 in)
- Propulsion: 2 shafts, Cat C18 ACERT diesels
- Speed: 23 kn (43 km/h); 45 kn (83 km/h) (Hull design, but limited due to engine fitted)
- Range: 550 nmi (1,020 km)
- Complement: 18 (training) (Note: 5 ship's company, 1 training officer, 12 URNU students.); 12 (operational)
- Armament: 1 × Oerlikon 20 mm cannon on fo'c'sle ("for but not with"); 3 × General purpose machine guns (Note: When operational and not in URNU role.)

HMS Ranger is an Archer-class patrol and training vessel of the British Royal Navy, based in HMNB Portsmouth. She is affiliated to Sussex and Brighton Universities' University Royal Naval Unit (or SUSURNU), which has its offices at the University of Sussex, Brighton. Her badge is a ship's wheel superimposed on seven blue roundels, representing the seven seas.

== Construction ==
HMS Ranger was built at Shoreham-by-Sea by Watercraft Ltd. in 1987.

== Operational history ==
Ranger was originally allocated to Ulster Division of the Royal Naval Reserve based in Belfast on HMS Caroline and used for Junior Officer training. In 1991 she went to Gibraltar with HMS Trumpeter to form the Gibraltar Squadron, and returned to the UK to become Sussex URNU's allocated P2000 in early 2004. Being a cadet training ship, Ranger is not equipped with live weaponry unless required for a supervised training exercise. It is fitted for – but not with – a 20 mm 85 GAM Cannon, as well as storage for four standard service rifles and two GPMGs.

Alongside HMS Trumpeter she was deployed on the Thames for the Thames Diamond Jubilee Pageant as part of the Royal Squadron escorting the Royal Barge. Subsequent to this, she departed upon a twelve-week deployment in company with Trumpeter, Example and Explorer around the Baltic, representing the UK at Kiel Week.

In June 2017, Ranger, in company with HM Ships Smiter, Archer and Exploit, deployed to the Baltic to take part in the NATO BALTOPS exercise, the first time that Royal Navy P2000s have been involved in such an exercise.

== Role ==
Ranger provides sea training to members of the Sussex University Royal Naval Unit. She can also be tasked with maritime security, search and rescue and inshore patrol.

== Affiliations ==
- Sussex and Brighton University Royal Naval Unit
- Seaford College CCF
- Lewes District Council
- TS Defiance (Newhaven & Seaford Sea Cadets)
- Bond of Friendship - Ocracoke, North Carolina
