= HMS Tracker (P274) =

1998 Archer-class patrol and training vessel

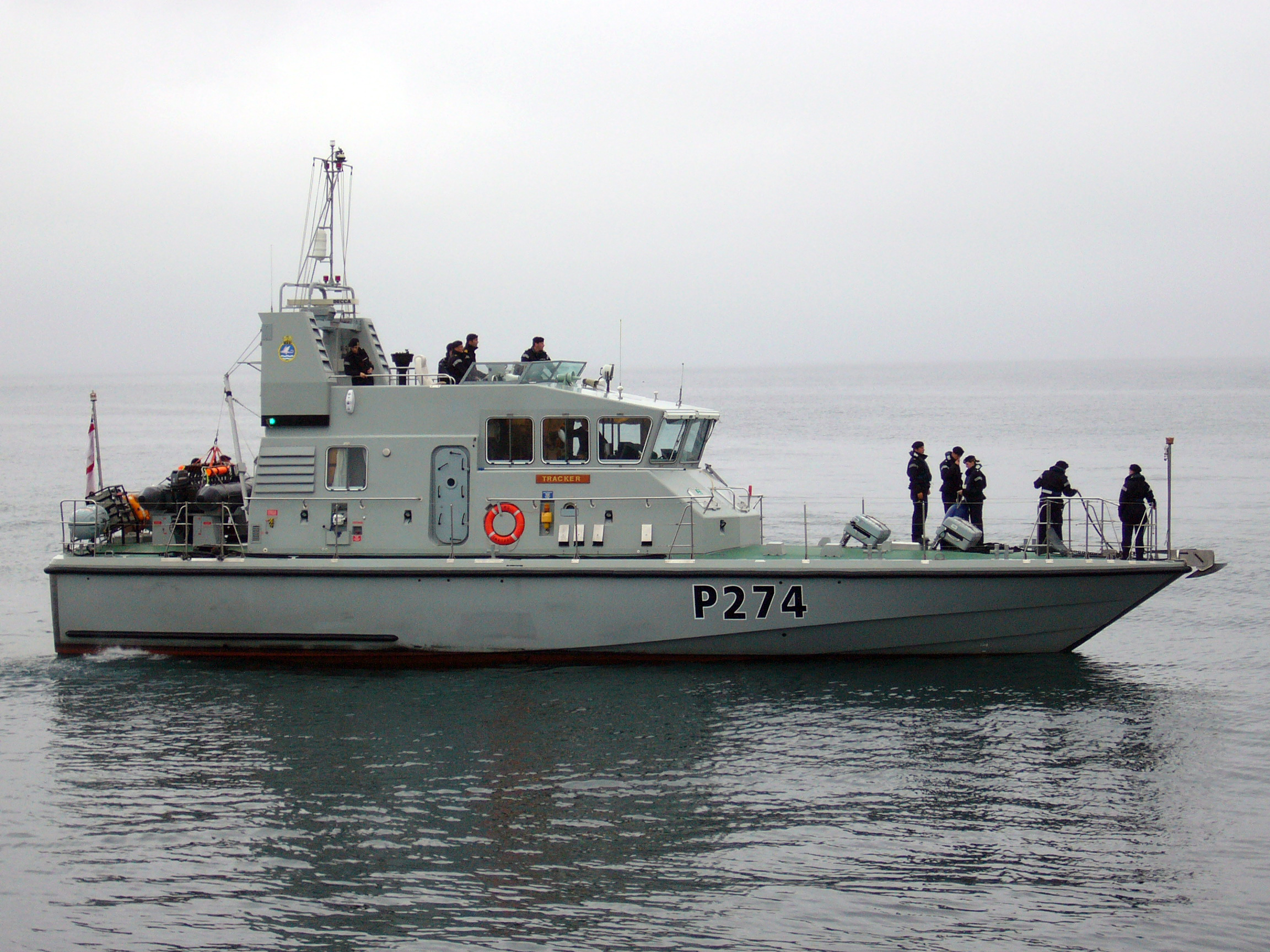
- HMS Tracker in 2006

History

United Kingdom
- Name: HMS Tracker
- Operator: Royal Navy
- Builder: Ailsa Shipbuilding Company
- Commissioned: January 1998
- Home port: HMNB Clyde
- Identification: Pennant number: P274; MMSI number: 235009960; Callsign: GCUU; IMO number: 9179517
- Status: In active service

General characteristics
- Class & type: Archer-class patrol vessel
- Displacement: 54 tonnes
- Length: 20.8 m (68 ft)
- Beam: 5.8 m (19 ft)
- Draught: 1.8 m (5 ft 11 in)
- Propulsion: 2 shafts, Rolls-Royce MTU V12 diesel engines
- Speed: 20 kn (37 km/h); 45 kn (83 km/h) (Hull design, but limited by gearbox and shaft tourque)
- Range: 400 nmi (740 km)
- Complement: 12
- Sensors & processing systems: Sperry Marine Navigation Radar
- Armament: 1 × Oerlikon 20 mm cannon on fo'c'sle ("for but not with"); 3 × Mounted General purpose machine guns; 5 × SA80A2 (Personal Rifles)
- Armour: Ballistic protection fitted

HMS Tracker is an Archer-class (P2000) patrol and training vessel of the British Royal Navy. Along with the batch 2 Archer class, HMS Raider, Tracker is part of the Faslane Patrol Boat Squadron based at HMNB Clyde.

== Characteristics ==
Tracker is one of sixteen 20-metre, 54-tonne P2000 patrol craft operated by the Royal Navy. She is constructed from glass-reinforced plastic. The hull was built by Kingfisher Boats of Falmouth, Cornwall. As a "batch 2" vessel, Tracker has a sustainable top speed of 24 knots, faster than her batch 1 sister ships due to her more powerful turbocharged MTU diesels; she can exceed 24 knots in suitable sea conditions. Both Raider and Tracker operate in the force protection role, providing maritime security for high value shipping in the Firth of Clyde, and are armed with three general purpose machine guns.

== Details ==
Tracker commissioned alongside her sister Raider in January 1998, with Tracker replacing Oxford University Royal Naval Unit's previous training craft, Loyal Chancellor. She served with Oxford University Royal Naval Unit for sea-based training of both students and regular personnel in UK and European waters. In October 2012 both Tracker and Raider joined the Faslane Patrol Boat Squadron.
