= HMS Charger (P292) =

Archer-class patrol vessel of the Royal Navy

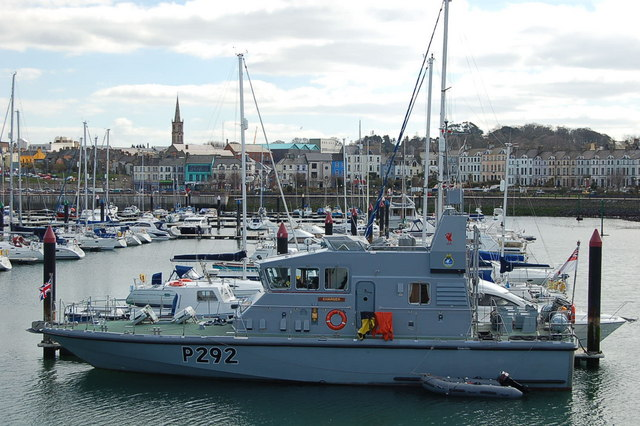
- HMS Charger at Bangor, 2006

History

United Kingdom
- Name: HMS Charger
- Operator: Royal Navy
- Builder: Watercraft Limited, Shoreham-by-Sea; Vosper Thornycroft
- Launched: 1986
- Commissioned: 1988
- Home port: HMS Eaglet, Liverpool
- Identification: MMSI number: 235009880; Callsign: GAAX; Pennant number: P292
- Status: In active service

General characteristics
- Class & type: Archer-class patrol vessel
- Displacement: 54 tonnes
- Length: 20.8 m (68 ft)
- Beam: 5.8 m (19 ft)
- Draught: 1.8 m (5 ft 11 in)
- Propulsion: 2 shafts, Rolls-Royce M800T diesels, 1,590 bhp
- Speed: 14 kn (26 km/h); 45 kn (83 km/h) (Hull design, but limited due to engine fitted)
- Range: 550 nmi (1,020 km)
- Complement: 18 (training) (Note: 5 ship's company, 1 training officer, 12 URNU students.); 12 (operational)
- Sensors & processing systems: Decca 1216 navigation radar
- Armament: 1 × Oerlikon 20 mm cannon on fo'c'sle ("for but not with"); 3 × General purpose machine guns (Note: When operational and not in URNU role.)

HMS Charger is an Archer-class patrol vessel built by Watercraft Limited, Shoreham-by-Sea and fitted out at Vosper Thornycroft. She is just over 20 metres long and 5.8 metres wide and powered by two Rolls-Royce turbo engines. The ship is based at HMS Eaglet, the Royal Naval Headquarters in Liverpool and was commissioned in 1988. She has five full-time RN crew, and sails with an RNR training officer and a maximum complement of 12 students. She is attached to the Liverpool University Royal Naval Unit.

== Role ==
Charger provides sea training for members of Liverpool University Royal Naval Unit. In 2011 she deployed to the Baltic, visiting ports in Belgium, the Netherlands, Germany and Denmark and transiting both the Caledonian and Kiel Canals. The ship is affiliated to the Cumbrian town of Maryport and regularly visits the town during deployments and for Remembrance Day ceremonies. In 2012, the ship's frequent visits to Preston resulted in the ship being formally adopted by the people of Preston. In 2013, Charger, became the first Royal Navy vessel in the 21st century to make the journey up the River Weaver to Northwich.

== Refit ==
During a refit in 2016 she was fitted with upgraded engines.

== Affiliations ==
- City of Preston, Lancashire
- Town of Maryport
- HMS Liverpool
- HMS Astute
- Eaglet
- Liverpool University
- Liverpool John Moores University
- Lancaster University
- Sandbach School
- Merchant Taylors' School, Crosby
- TS Tuscan (Connah's Quay Sea Cadets)
- TS Caesar (Maryport Solway Sea Cadets)
- Market Drayton RNA
