= HMS Smiter (P272) =

Archer-class patrol vessel of the Royal Navy

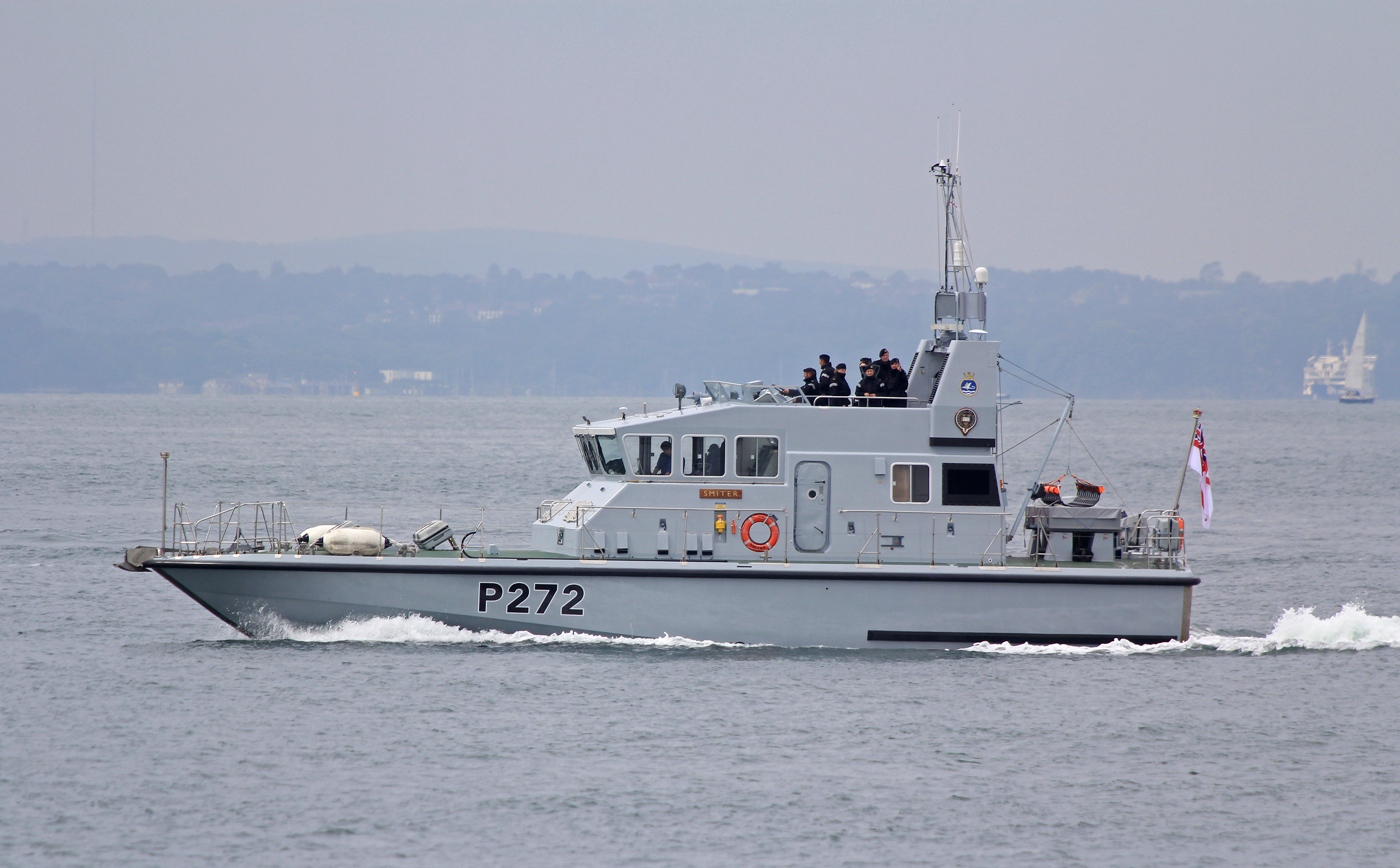
- HMS Smiter on the Solent outward bound from Portsmouth Naval Base 17 June 2016.

History

United Kingdom
- Name: HMS Smiter
- Operator: Royal Navy
- Builder: Watercraft Marine
- Laid down: 1985
- Launched: 1985
- Completed: 22 January 1986
- Commissioned: 4 September 1986
- Home port: HMNB Portsmouth
- Identification: MMSI number: 235009950; Callsign: GAAS
- Motto: "Strike hard and often"
- Status: In active service
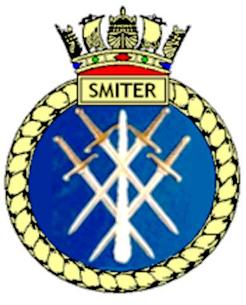
- Badge

General characteristics
- Class & type: Archer-class patrol vessel
- Displacement: 54 tonnes
- Length: 20.8 m (68 ft)
- Beam: 5.8 m (19 ft)
- Draught: 1.8 m (5 ft 11 in)
- Propulsion: 2 shafts, Rolls-Royce M800T diesels, 1,590 bhp
- Speed: 14 kn (26 km/h); 45 kn (83 km/h) (Hull design, but limited due to engine fitted)
- Range: 550 nmi (1,020 km)
- Complement: 18 (training) (Note: 5 ship's company, 1 training officer, 12 URNU students.); 12 (operational)
- Sensors & processing systems: Decca 1216 navigation radar
- Armament: 1 × Oerlikon 20 mm cannon on fo'c'sle ("for but not with"); 3 × General purpose machine guns (Note: When operational and not in URNU role.)

HMS Smiter is an Archer-class patrol and training vessel of the Royal Navy.

== Operational history ==
Upon being accepted into service, she initially served with the Clyde Division of the Royal Naval Reserve until 11 October 1990. She then transferred to the University Royal Naval Unit (URNU) of Glasgow. In September 2012, she became the training vessel of the Oxford University Royal Naval Unit. She replaced HMS Tracker in this role, which transferred to the Faslane Force Protection Squadron.

In June 2017, Smiter, in company with HM Ships Archer, Ranger and Exploit, deployed to the Baltic to take part in the NATO BALTOPS exercise, marking the first time that the Royal Navy P2000's were involved in such an exercise.

== Role ==
Smiter provides sea training for members of the Oxford University Royal Naval Unit.
