= Defence Technical Undergraduate Scheme =

The Defence Technical Undergraduate Scheme (DTUS) is a university sponsorship programme for students who want to join the Royal Navy, British Army, Royal Air Force or Engineering and Science branch of the Ministry of Defence (MOD) Civil Service as technical officers after they graduate; Army sponsored students are destined for either the Royal Corps of Signals, Royal Electrical and Mechanical Engineers, Royal Engineers or the Royal Logistic Corps. Students on the scheme are sponsored by the MOD to study accredited technical degree programmes. The aim of DTUS is ‘to educate and develop selected individuals to prepare them for further training and careers as engineer or technical officers in the Armed Forces or as graduate entrants to the MOD Civil Service’.

== Background ==
The DTUS was created following the 2001 Defence Training Review (DTR). The DTR identified that the Royal Navy, British Army, Royal Air Force and MOD Civil Service had difficulties in recruiting engineering officers. As a result, DTUS was created whereby sponsored students study at eleven partner universities (Aston, Birmingham, Cambridge, Imperial College, Loughborough, Newcastle, Northumbria, Oxford, Portsmouth, Southampton and Strathclyde).

== Support units ==
DTUS students are able to choose the partner university they wish to study at and select a degree course that has been approved by their sponsoring service. Whilst at their partner university, all students belong to a support unit who are responsible for their leadership development, mentorship and administration. They also closely monitor academic progress, to that end the commanding officer of each support unit has visiting lecturer status at their university to support this. There are four support units throughout the UK:

- Taurus Squadron based in Birmingham supports students at Aston University and the University of Birmingham. It also administers students at the University of Oxford.
- Thunderer Squadron based in Southampton supports students at the University of Southampton as well as the University of Portsmouth. It also administers students at Imperial College London.
- Trojan Squadron based in Newcastle upon Tyne supports students at Newcastle and Northumbria universities. It administers students at the University of Strathclyde
- Typhoon Squadron based in Loughborough supports students at Loughborough University. It also administers students at the University of Cambridge.

=== Staffing ===
Each support unit is commanded by the same equivalent rank from each service; Taurus and Trojan Squadrons – lieutenant colonel, Thunderer Squadron – commander and Typhoon Squadron – wing commander. There are a Royal Navy lieutenant, an Army captain and a Royal Air Force flight lieutenant working as training officers in each squadron. Additionally at each squadron there is an SNCO and a civilian administrator. Assisting at each squadron are in-service degree officers who are commissioned officers reading for a degree at the partner university.

== Students ==
Each military sponsored student is a member of their respective service reserve forces (and holds a Service number) and holds the rank of officer cadet (midshipman for Royal Navy-sponsored students). All students receive an annual bursary and also receive training pay for the activities that they participate in. In return, students are expected to remain physically fit (pass an annual fitness assessment known as a PFA), advance each academic year and serve for a minimum of three years in the Armed Forces or MOD Civil Service after graduating from Initial Officer Training (IOT).

The majority of entrants on the DTUS were graduates of the Defence Sixth Form College (Welbeck) near Woodhouse, Leicestershire until its closure in 2021. However, students studying or scheduled to study an approved degree at any of the partner universities may also apply to join the scheme as a Direct Entrant (DE)

== Closure ==
The scheme is to shut down over a five-year transition period following the announced closure of Welbeck Defence Sixth Form College (DSFC), closed in 2021. The wider Defence Technical Officer Engineering Entry Scheme (DTOEES) was originally going to be replaced by the STEM Graduate Inflow Scheme (SGIS), which was later renamed as the Defence STEM Undergraduate Scheme (DSUS), with a planned start of 2022.

== See also ==
- University Royal Naval Unit
- Officers' Training Corps
- University Air Squadron
