= University Royal Naval Unit =

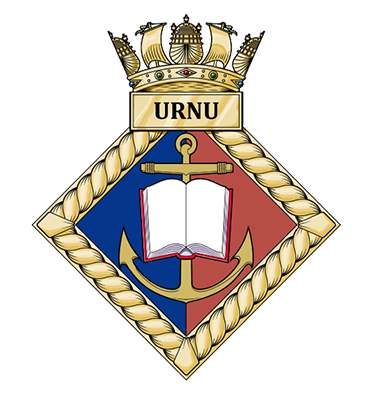
- Crest of the URNU
- Active: 1967 – present
- Country: United Kingdom
- Branch: Royal Navy
- Type: Training establishment University Service Units
- Role: Officer Training
- Size: 17 Units
- Part of: Britannia Royal Naval College; Royal Naval Reserve
- Nickname: URNU
- Equipment: Archer-class patrol vessels (P2000s)
- Website: royalnavy.mod.uk/urnu

Commanders
- Current commander: Cdr Andrew Loring RN (2022- )

The University Royal Naval Units (URNU) (/ˈər.nuː/ UHR-noo, less commonly /ˈɜːr.nuː/ ERR-noo) (formerly Universities' Royal Naval Units) are Royal Navy training establishments under the command of Britannia Royal Naval College, who recruit Officer Cadets from a university or a number of universities, usually concentrated in one geographical area. There are 17 URNUs in the UK, with each URNU having land-based facilities near the universities they recruit from, with the exception of URNU Virtual, whose drill nights are conducted virtually.

Students who join the URNU become members of Royal Naval Reserve and upon joining hold the rank of Officer Cadet, Students of the URNU are classed as List 7 of the Royal Naval Reserve and as such have no call-out liability whilst in their University Unit.

Some members of the URNU go on to pass Admiralty Interview Board and undertake Officer Training to Commission as a Royal Naval Officer or Royal Marines Officer, however there is no requirement to do so and URNU members have no obligation of further service after leaving University.

Each unit has an affiliated P2000 ship, which is used for training Officer Cadets when not on duty with the Coastal Forces Squadron.

== Units ==
Unit shore locations, University Royal Navy Units

Unit	Date established	Unit location
East Scotland	1967	Hepburn House, Edinburgh; RMR Strathmore Avenue, Dundee
Glasgow	1972	Glasgow University, Glasgow
Liverpool	1972	HMS Eaglet, Liverpool
Birmingham	1984	HMS Forward, Birmingham
London	1985	HMS President, London
Bristol	1986	HMS Flying Fox, Bristol
Manchester	1986	University Barracks, Manchester
Cambridge	1994	Coldhams Lane, Cambridge
Northumbria	1994	HMS Calliope, Gateshead
Oxford	1994	Falklands House, Oxford
Wales	1994	HMS Cambria, Cardiff
Yorkshire	1994	HMS Ceres, Leeds
Devon	2017	HMS Vivid, Plymouth
Solent	2021	HMS King Alfred, Portsmouth
Belfast	2021	HMS Hibernia, Belfast
East Midlands	2021	HMS Sherwood, Chilwell
Virtual	2021	UK

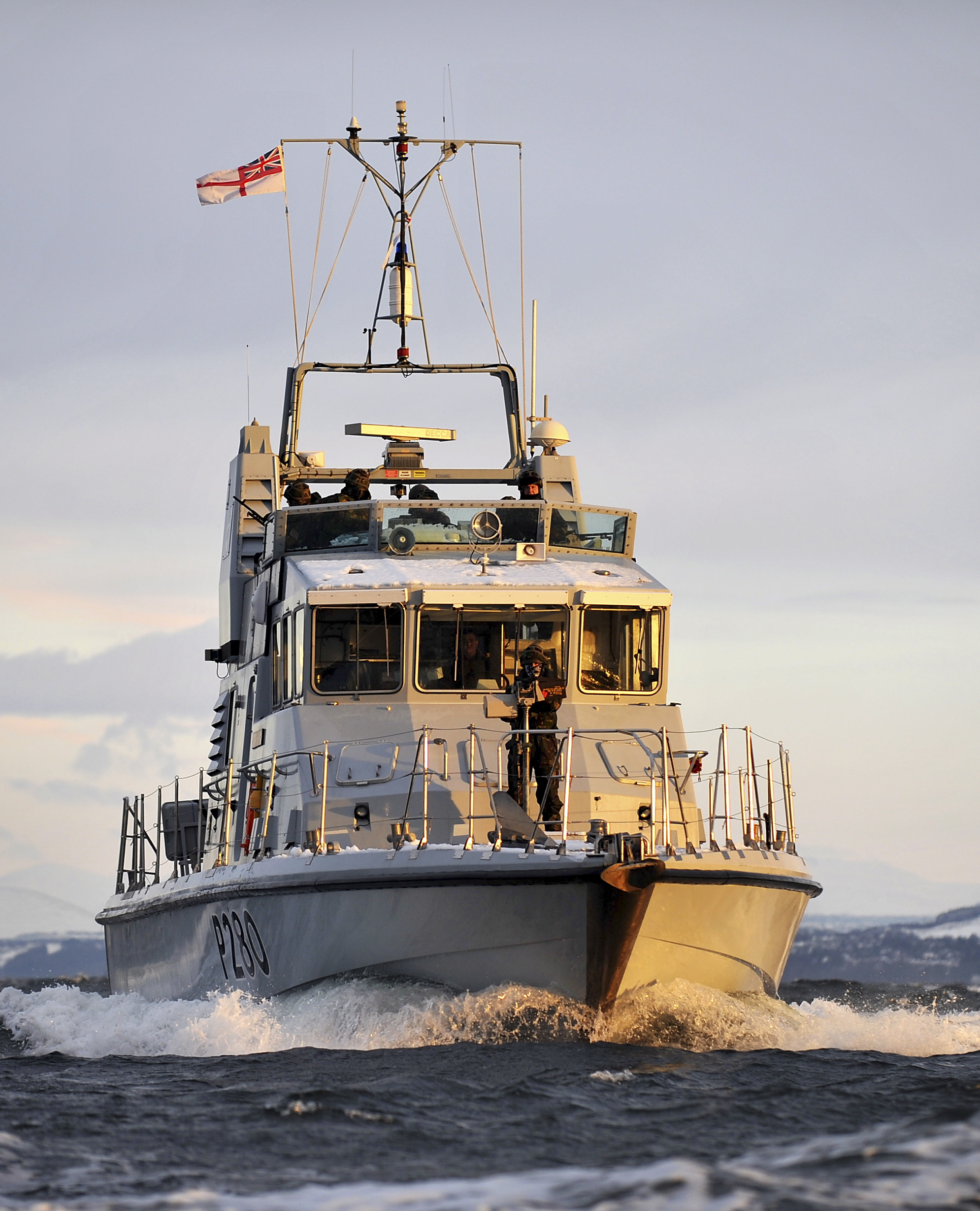
HMS Dasher, attached to URNU Bristol, at Faslane in 2010

URNU ships are part of the Coastal Forces Squadron, or "CFS". CFS is commanded by Commander CFS, who previously was also Commander URNU, Commander Universities now being a separate post. The mission statement of CFS is to provide high-quality sea training experiences in support of the URNU mission and to deliver P2000 operational capability in support of other fleet tasking.

== History ==
=== 1967 – 1999 ===
The URNU programme was founded in 1967, with the formation of the Aberdeen Universities' Royal Naval Unit (now URNU East Scotland) in Aberdeen, Scotland, to encourage STEM undergraduates to join the Royal Navy from the University of Aberdeen and Robert Gordon University.

This was followed 5 years later in 1972, with the introduction of Glasgow & Strathclyde URNU (Now URNU Glasgow) and Liverpool URNU, which also served universities with a high number of STEM undergraduates.

After being male-only units for their first 20 years, the URNUs finally allowed women to join their ranks in 1987, with the Aberdeen URNU being the first to do so.

In 1999, (then) Lt Mel Robinson and (then) Lt Suzanne Moore became the first women to hold command of a Royal Navy vessel, with their commands of Cardiff URNU (now URNU Wales) and Bristol URNU, as well as their attached P2000s, HMS Express and HMS Dasher respectively.

=== 2000 – present ===
In June 2017, OCs onboard HM Ships Archer, Smiter, Ranger and Exploit, deployed to the Baltic to take part in NATO's BALTOPS exercise, the first time that Royal Navy P2000s have been involved in such an exercise. URNU Officer Cadets have been attending the exercise every year since, with the exception of 2022, due to increased tensions in the region following the re-escalation of the Russo-Ukrainian War.

Devon URNU was established in the autumn of 2017, catering to universities across the region. Devon was the first new unit formed since 1994.

In 2021 there was a further expansion of the URNU, with new units in East Midlands, Belfast, Solent and Virtual. Solent URNU was a merging of Southampton URNU and Sussex URNU, with the unit moving to a new location within Portsmouth HMNB Portsmouth. East Midlands URNU and Belfast URNU were both new units to cover holes in the coverage of URNU units where there are also large numbers of potential students. Virtual URNU was also setup after a year and half of online URNU to cater to those unable to get to a unit due to distance or any other issue.

In late 2021, there was a nation-wide naming change of the URNUs. They were formerly styled '[Location] URNU' (e.g. Edinburgh URNU), being changed by the end of the year to 'URNU [Location]' (e.g. URNU Edinburgh).

In January 2022, after striking an agreement with HMS Scotia, Tay Division, (the then) URNU Edinburgh opened a satellite division known now as URNU East Scotland, Tayside Division (often abbreviated to Tay Div), named for the Firth of Tay which runs just south of Dundee, the city in which the division is based. It is based out of a Royal Marines Reserve base in the north of the city centre. Its foundation was a first for the URNU programme and has become the testbed for a potential scheme to extend the URNU footprint.

== Membership ==
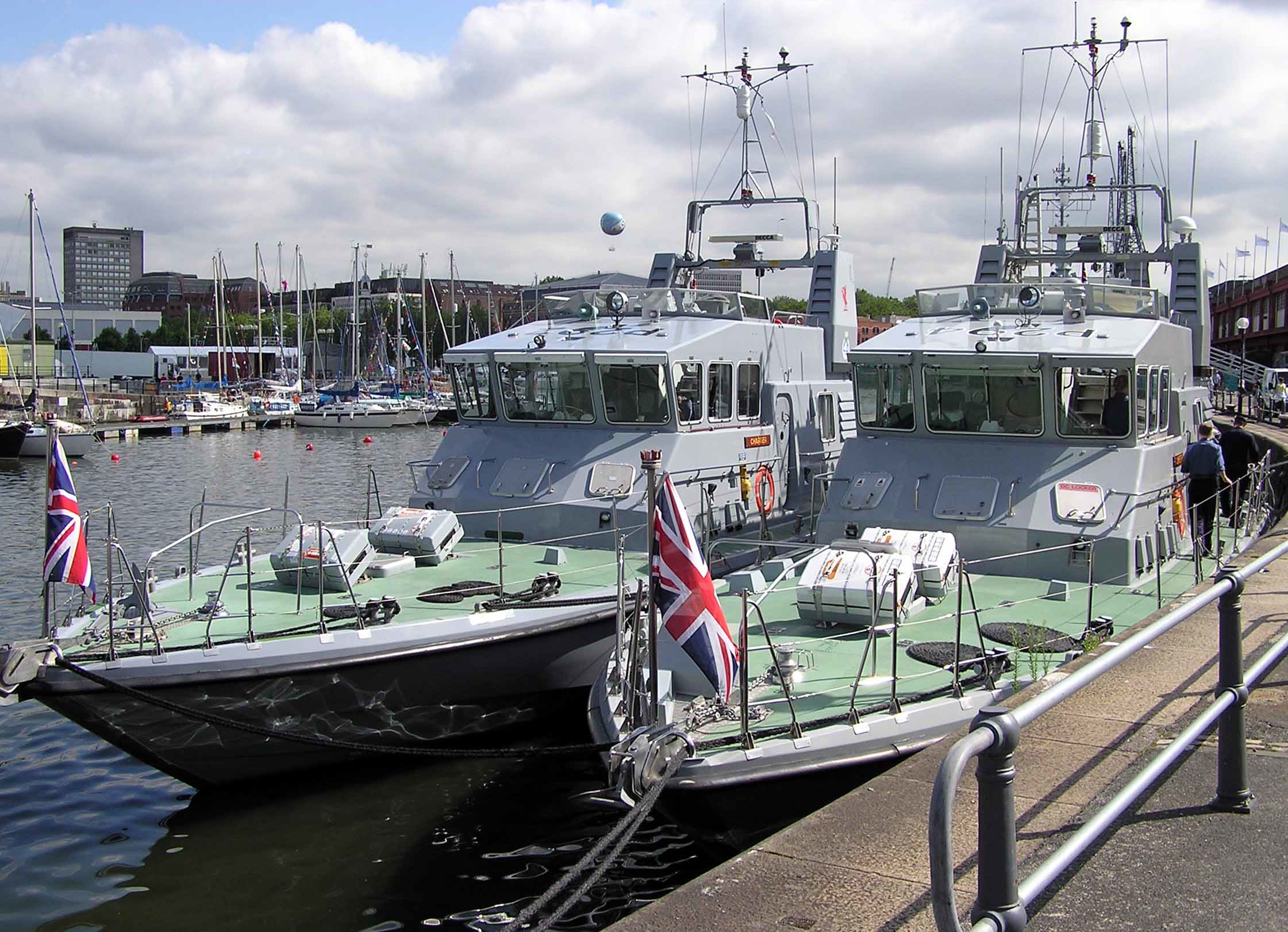
University Royal Naval Unit training vessels Charger (left) and Trumpeter in Bristol in 2004

=== Command structure and staff ===
The URNUs are part of the University Service Units, under the command of Commander Universities. They fall under the overall jurisdiction of the Commanding Officer of Britannia Royal Naval College, Dartmouth, Captain BRNC.

The University Royal Naval Units are divided into two sectors. URNU North and URNU South, which are usually commanded by a full-time Royal Navy Lieutenant Commander or Royal Marines Major.

Individual units are commanded in geographical pairs by an Officer-in-Charge (OiC), usually a full-time Royal Navy Lieutenant, or Royal Marines Captain. Individual units each maintain a unit Coxswain (Cox'n or Coxn), usually a full-time Chief Petty Officer, Royal Marines Colour Sergeant or, exceptionally, a Royal Navy or Royal Marines Warrant Officer, as well as a Unit/Regional Administration Officer (UAO/RAO), who is a civilian and does not wear uniform.

Each unit also has the capacity for up to eight training officers, who may be ex-Royal Navy, former URNU students, or civilians with relevant experience, who are appointed as temporary Royal Naval Reserve officers, though they do not hold a commission and are not required to pass an Admiralty Interview Board (AIB). Training Officers are however required to meet the same medical standards as Regular and Reservist personnel within the service, and are encouraged to meet the same annual fitness standards. Training Officers are distinguished from other Regular and Reserve service Officers by a gold embroidered ‘R’ placed centrally within the curl of their respective rank epaulette.

The training staff of an individual unit consists of a Royal Naval Reserve Lieutenant as the unit's Senior Training Officer (STO) and a number of Training Officers (TOs), who vary between Royal Naval Reserve Acting Sub-Lieutenants, Sub-Lieutenants and Lieutenants. This format, with the exception of rank, roughly mirrors the training staff and format of BRNC.

Should the Training Officers wish they are also able to attend AIBs and pass out of the Royal Naval Reserve's Accelerated Officer Programme, and retain a position within both their local Reserve and University Royal Naval Unit.

=== URNU Cadets ===
Undergraduates usually join for three years, with options to extend this membership to four or five years, providing they can sufficiently convince their Officer-in-Charge that their continued membership would be of value to the unit. Members are list 7B reservists and therefore there is no call-up liability and members may leave at any time. During membership cadet's must pass Royal Naval medical standards in order to join their respective unit, and are equally encouraged to meet Royal Naval fitness standards, to make the most of opportunities available to them.

Each URNU comprises up to 51 students, who usually join for the duration of their degree, with the option of taking a year out or leaving at any time. The URNU's also have attached cadets that are on Navy sponsorship/cadetship programs.

==== Ranks ====
URNU cadets work through training logs and receive training task books on joining their unit. With certain levels of completeness of this task book corresponding to respective URNU ranks and pay.

Upon joining the unit, URNU students wear URNU tabs on their uniform and are referred to as ‘Cadet’. On completion of the first section of their task book, cadets will receive a white officer cadet tab in addition to the URNU slide, however are still referred to as ‘Cadet’. Only on completion of their task book will students will receive the rank of Acting Midshipman (A/Mid) and be able to wear midshipman slides in addition to URNU tabs, and then be referred to as Acting Midshipmen (A/Mid).

To achieve the substantive rank of Midshipman the URNU cadets must pass out of BRNC via the reserve or regular courses - such as the Accelerated Officers Programme.

==== Committee ====
Each URNU has a senior midshipman (SMid) and deputy senior midshipman (DSMid) (Sometimes referred to as the Vice-president 'VP’ due to their role as the Mess vice-president) supported by a committee, made up of various roles, which differ according to unit but will generally include a treasurer and sports and adventurous training officers alongside other roles.

This committee will take a leading role in programme planning and assist in the running of the unit each academic year.

== Training and unit life ==
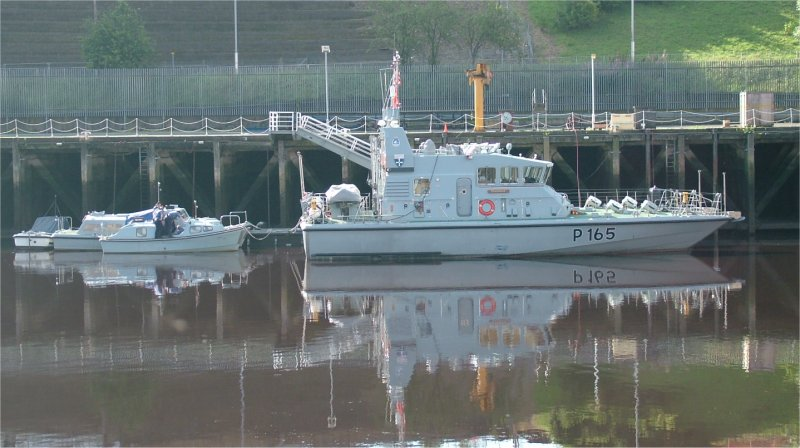
HMS Example on the River Tyne at HMS Calliope, Gateshead

Training focuses on leadership, navigation and seamanship, and this is put into practice during sea weekends, and longer deployments during the summer and Easter vacations. Drill nights also often include lessons on wider navy knowledge, drill practice, and visits from serving personnel and affiliated units as well as practical leadership tasks and team building. Units also frequently undertake visits to affiliated units and local training establishments to experience military life first hand.

There is also a significant and important social element to URNU life from formal mess dinners including the main naval formal event of the year, Trafalgar Night, to informal socialising in the unit's mess which contribute to unit integration and may be coordinated by a dedicated social secretary. Additionally, Scottish and Northern Irish URNUs hold an annual Burns night dinner.

There are sporting activities held within the URNU units, informal contests between the units and an annual sports weekend in Portsmouth between all units.

== See also ==
- University Officer Training Corps, the British Army equivalent
- University Air Squadron, the Royal Air Force equivalent
- Naval Reserve Officers Training Corps, the United States equivalent
- Defence Technical Undergraduate Scheme
