= HMS Exploit (P167) =

Archer-class patrol vessel of the Royal Navy

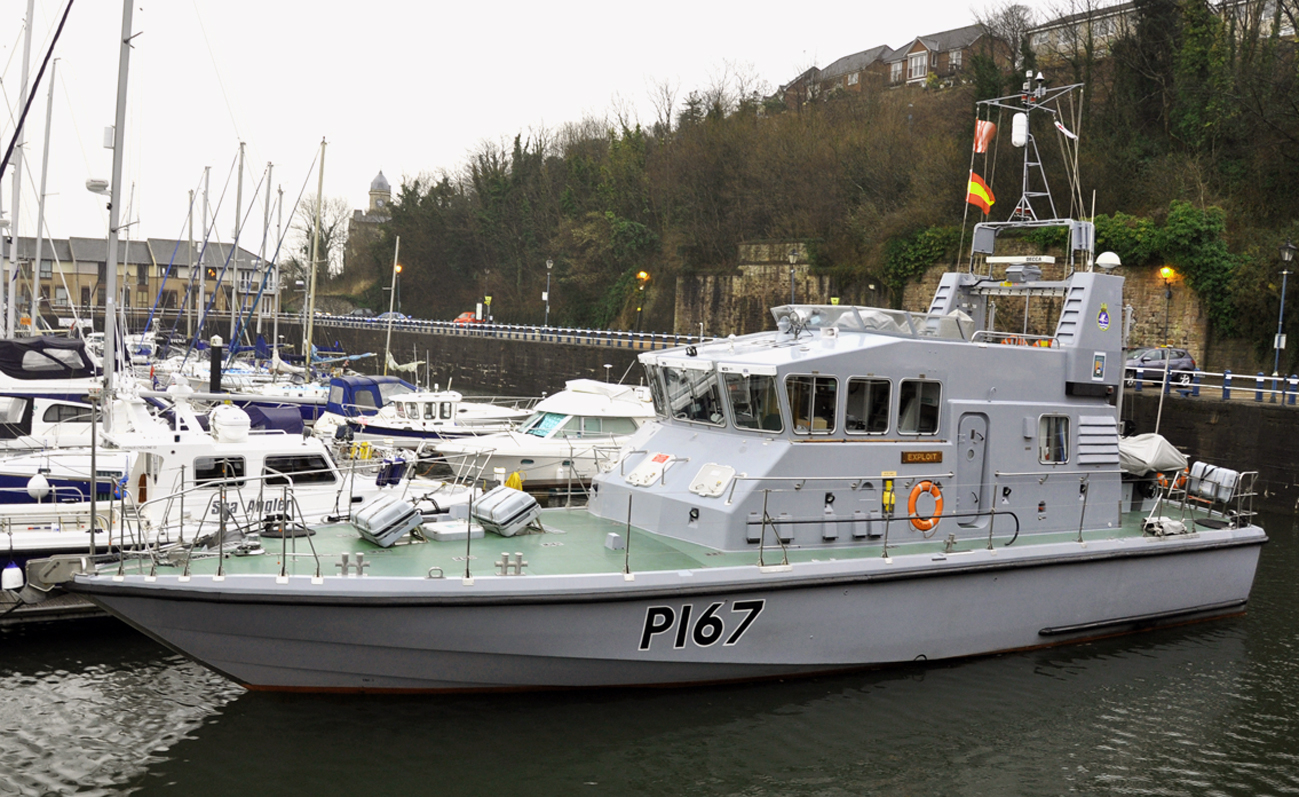
- HMS Exploit

History

United Kingdom
- Name: HMS Exploit
- Operator: Royal Navy
- Builder: Vosper Thornycroft
- Commissioned: 1988
- Identification: MMSI number: 235009900; Callsign: GABD
- Motto: Actis Inclitis - With Illustrious Deeds
- Status: In active service

General characteristics
- Class & type: Archer-class patrol vessel
- Displacement: 54 tonnes
- Length: 20.8 m (68 ft 3 in)
- Beam: 5.8 m (19 ft 0 in)
- Draught: 1.8 m (5 ft 11 in)
- Installed power: 1,590 bhp
- Propulsion: 2 shafts, Rolls-Royce M800T diesels
- Speed: 20 kn (37 km/h)
- Range: 550 nmi (1,020 km)
- Complement: 5 ship's company plus up to 1 training officer and 12 URNU students
- Sensors & processing systems: Decca 1216 navigation radar

HMS Exploit is an Archer-class (or P2000) patrol vessel of the British Royal Navy, built in Woolston by Vosper Thornycroft and commissioned in 1988. She is assigned to the Royal Navy Coastal Forces Squadron, carrying out a range of activities both in the U.K. and overseas.

The ship's company consists of a permanent staff of the commanding officer, two senior rates and two junior rates, but can take up to twelve students with training officers usually embarked when conducting navigational training. Whilst at sea, students are able to put into practice navigation and seamanship skills they have learnt in the classroom during weekly training nights. These include chart planning, acting as Officer of the Watch, using the ship's radar and carrying out seamanship evolutions from anchoring to securing alongside. Instruction is given in engineering, firefighting, damage control and ship handling. The ship is based in HMNB Portsmouth.

== Operational history ==
=== Royal Naval Auxiliary Service ===
XSV Exploit was originally ordered for the now defunct Royal Naval Auxiliary Service (RNXS) and had a distinctive black hull like other RNXS vessels.

On 19 March 1994, a serious machinery space fire occurred on Exploit approximately 30 miles off Lundy island as she was being transferred to Portsmouth from Greenock as part of the managed run down of the service by RNXS crew. The Padstow lifeboat and the RAF SAR Helicopter from Chivenor, were scrambled, and a tanker on route to Milford Haven was diverted to help, but were not needed. The fire was later attributed to a major mechanical failure of the starboard main engine, resulting in a large hole in the sump casing. The fire spread quickly to the air ducts, igniting various rubber coolant pipes causing thick acrid smoke.

=== Royal Navy ===
In June 2017, Exploit, in company with HM Ships Smiter, Ranger and Archer, deployed to the Baltic to take part in the NATO BALTOPS exercise, the first time that Royal Navy P2000s have been involved in such an exercise.

In the early 2020s, Exploit, along with other Archer-class vessels, was given a more operational role as part of the reconstituted Coastal Forces Squadron. In early 2024, Exploit and three of her sister ships deployed to northern Norway as part of the NATO exercise "Steadfast Defender".

== Affiliations ==
- HMS Daring
- HMS Ambush
- TS Blackcap - Birkenhead Sea Cadets
- TS Minerva - Rhondda Sea Cadets
- TS Sutton Coldfield - Sutton Coldfield Sea Cadets
- Hereford Cathedral School CCF
- The University of Birmingham
- 845 Naval Air Squadron
- The town of Berkeley
- Brownhills Girl Guides, Walsall
