= Archer-class patrol vessel =

Class of patrol and training vessel of the Royal Navy

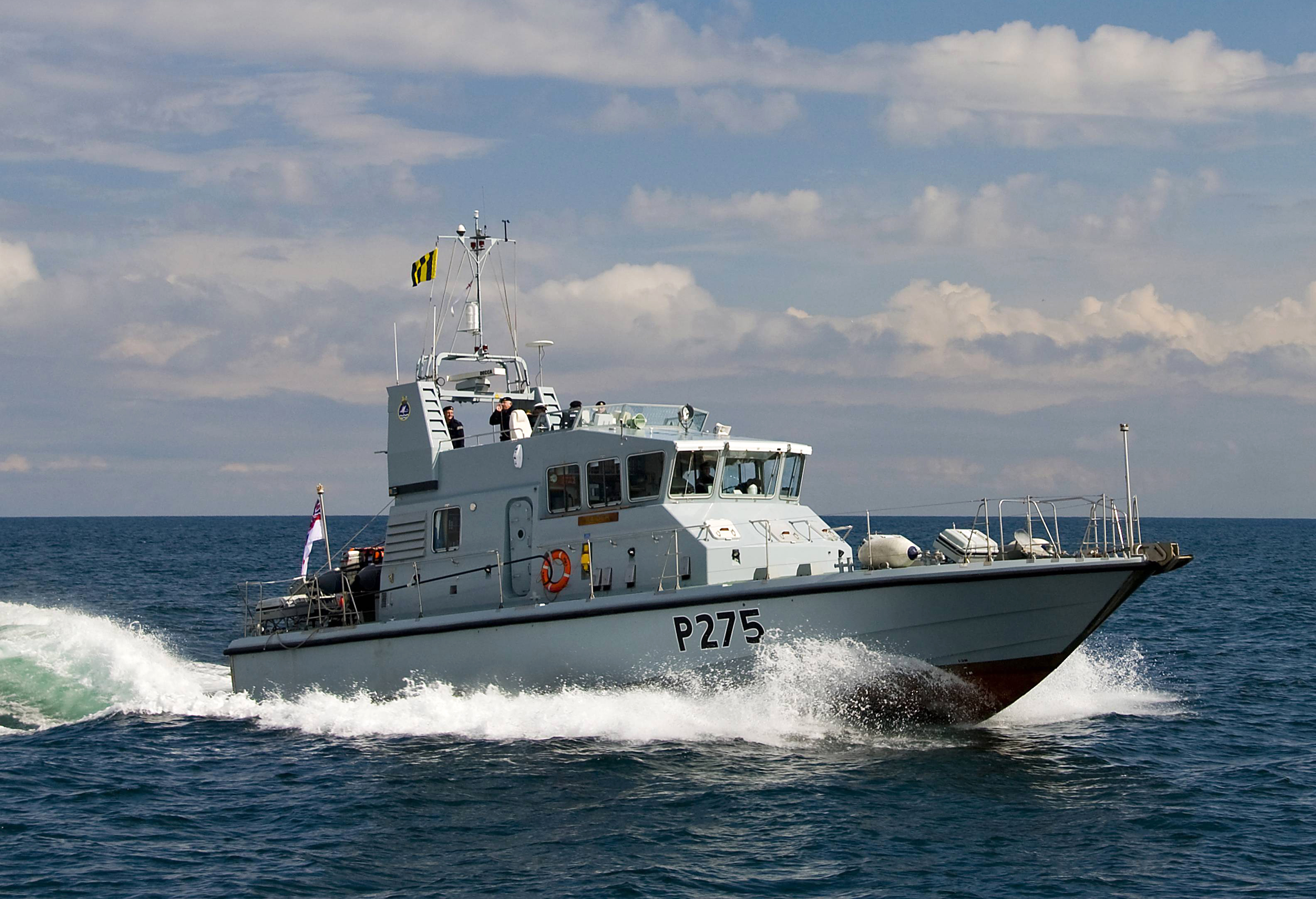
- HMS Raider, 2009

Class overview
- Name: Archer class
- Builders: Watercraft Marine; Vosper Thornycroft; Ailsa Shipbuilding Company
- Operators: (United Kingdom) Royal Navy; Royal Oman Police
- Succeeded by: Scimitar class; Cutlass class
- In commission: 1985–present
- Active: 17 (16 Royal Navy, 1 Royal Oman Police)

General characteristics
- Type: Patrol boat & training vessel
- Displacement: 54 t (53 long tons)
- Length: 19.9 m (65 ft 3 in)
- Beam: 5.8 m (19 ft 0 in)
- Draught: 1.9 m (6 ft 3 in)
- Propulsion: 2 shafts, Cat C18 ACERT diesels
- Speed: 20 knots (37 km/h; 23 mph); 42 knots (78 km/h; 48 mph) (Hull design, but limited due to engine fitted)
- Range: 550 nmi (1,020 km; 630 mi)
- Complement: 20 (training) (Note: 5-7 ship's company, 1 training officer, 6 URNU students.); 12 (operational)
- Sensors & processing systems: Decca 1216 navigation radar
- Armament: 1 × Oerlikon 20 mm cannon on fo'c'sle ("for but not with"); 3 × General purpose machine guns (Tracker, Raider, Dasher & Pursuer)

The Archer class (or P2000) is a class of patrol and training vessel in service with the United Kingdom's Royal Navy, commonly referred to as a "fast training boat". Most are assigned to Coastal Forces Squadron. HMS Tracker and HMS Raider are armed and provide maritime force protection to high value shipping in the Firth of Clyde and are most commonly employed as escorts for submarines transiting to Faslane. Pursuer and Dasher were also armed during their deployment on maritime force protection duties with the Gibraltar Squadron from 2020 to 2022.

== Development ==
Ten vessels were ordered as the P2000 class, based on a design of an Omani coastguard cutter, from Watercraft Marine. They are twin-shaft vessels with moulded glass-reinforced plastic hulls of 54 tonnes (53 long tons) displacement. After that company went into liquidation, the balance of the order was completed by Vosper Thornycroft.

The Archers were initially used as Royal Navy patrol craft and as training tenders for the Royal Naval Reserve (RNR) and University Royal Naval Units (URNU). Four identical vessels were ordered for the Royal Naval Auxiliary Service (RNXS) as Example-class tenders. When that service was disbanded in 1994, the Examples were transferred to the Royal Navy for similar duties as their Archer-class brethren (under the same names under which they served as "XSVs", all of which begin with the first syllable "Ex"). Until 2005, the four Examples were painted with a black hull.

In 1998 two additional vessels (Raider and Tracker) of this design were commissioned into the Royal Navy from Ailsa Shipbuilding Company, to replace HMS Loyal Watcher and HMS Loyal Chancellor as URNU training vessels for the two newest URNUs, serving Cambridge and Oxford Universities respectively (Raider was later transferred to Bristol URNU whilst Trumpeter became the ship of Cambridge URNU). This brought the total of Archer-class vessels in the Royal Navy to sixteen, of which fourteen form the Coastal Forces Squadron Squadron (formerly the 1st Patrol Boat Squadron), each one formerly attached to an URNU (one per unit) under the command of a lieutenant. The remaining two vessels (Pursuer and Dasher), having formed the Cyprus Squadron from 2003 to 2010, and URNU vessels before that, (Note: Pursuer was allocated to Sussex URNU, Dasher to Bristol URNU. They were replaced by Ranger and Trumpeter respectively in 2004.) returned to the UK in April 2010 to form the Faslane Patrol Boat Squadron, performing security duties within HMNB Clyde.

In 2012 Dasher and Pursuer were replaced by Raider and Tracker - these can be identified by a number of pintle-mounted L7 7.62 mm GPMG machine guns and armour plating. Ranger and Trumpeter were also formerly allocated to the Gibraltar Squadron for guard ship and search and rescue duties, but were replaced by the dedicated Scimitar class. These two ships were also used during the Thames River Pageant, escorting the Royal Barge during Queen Elizabeth II's Diamond Jubilee. Unlike the remainder of the class, both these ships remain capable of mounting a 20 mm cannon on the fo'c'sle.

The NATO designation of a P2000 is "PBR", denoting a "patrol boat - riverine and harbours".

== Vessels in the class ==
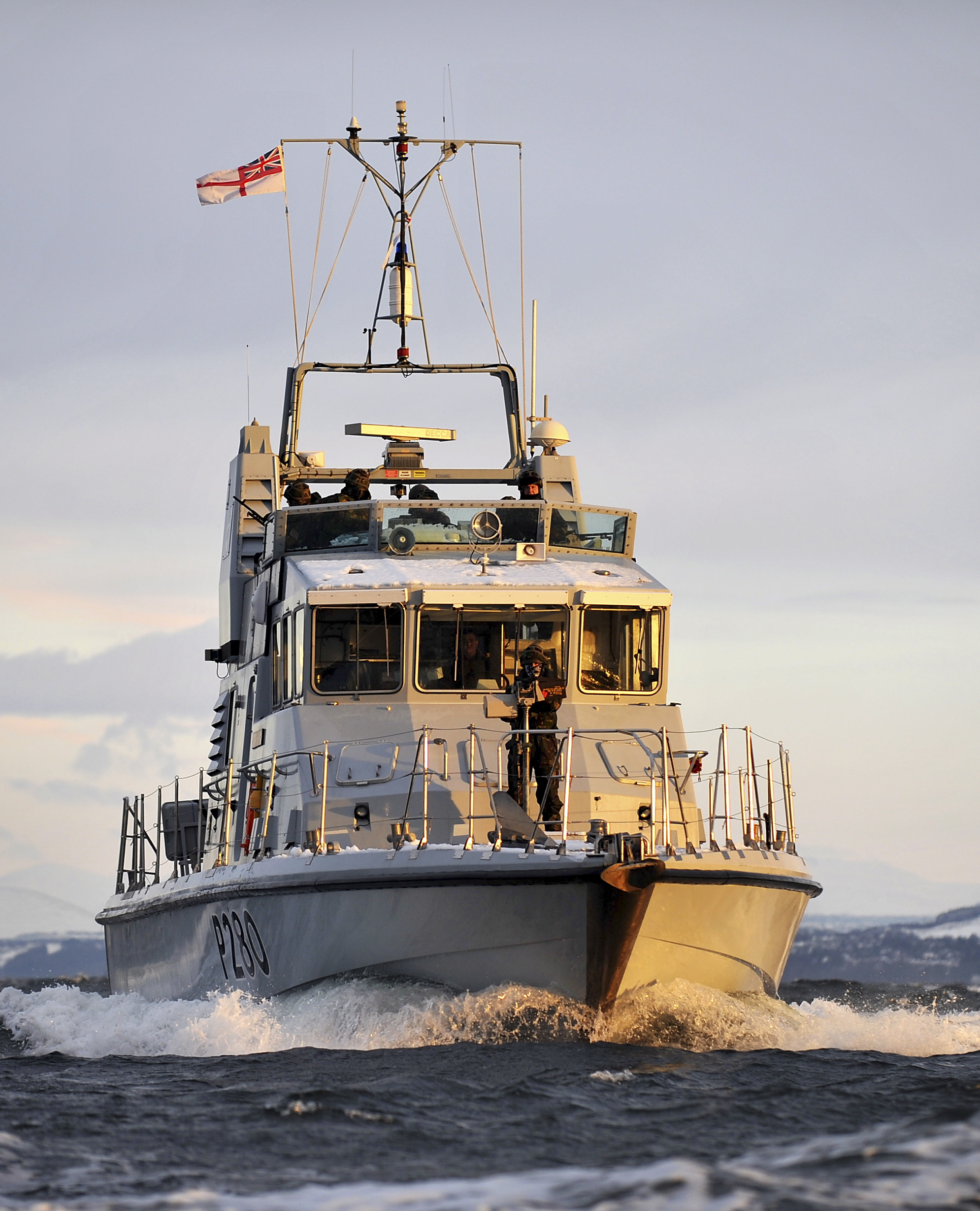
HMS Dasher pictured whilst escorting the nuclear submarine HMS Vanguard to her berth at HMNB Clyde

Royal Oman Police
Name	Pennant number	Builder	Commissioned	Attached to	Status
Dheeb Al Bahari		Watercraft Marine, Shoreham-by-Sea	1985	Police Coastguard Command	In active service
Royal Navy
Name	Pennant number	Builder	Commissioned	Attached to	Status
Archer	P264	Watercraft Marine	1985	Coastal Forces Squadron	In active service
Biter	P270	Watercraft Marine	1986	Coastal Forces Squadron	In active service
Smiter	P272	Watercraft Marine	1988	Coastal Forces Squadron	In active service
Pursuer	P273	Vosper Thornycroft, Woolston	1988	Coastal Forces Squadron	In active service
Blazer	P279	Vosper Thornycroft	1988	Coastal Forces Squadron	In active service
Dasher	P280	Vosper Thornycroft	1988	Coastal Forces Squadron	In active service
Puncher	P291	Vosper Thornycroft	1988	Coastal Forces Squadron	In active service
Charger	P292	Vosper Thornycroft	1988	Coastal Forces Squadron	In active service
Ranger	P293	Vosper Thornycroft	1988	Coastal Forces Squadron	In active service
Trumpeter	P294	Vosper Thornycroft	1988	Coastal Forces Squadron	In active service
Example (ex-XSV Example)	P165 (ex-A153)	Watercraft Marine	1985	Coastal Forces Squadron	In active service
Explorer (ex-XSV Explorer)	P164 (ex-A154)	Watercraft Marine	1986	Coastal Forces Squadron	In active service
Express (ex-XSV Express)	P163 (ex-A163)	Vosper Thornycroft	1988	Coastal Forces Squadron	In active service
Exploit (ex-XSV Exploit)	P167 (ex-A167)	Vosper Thornycroft	1988	Coastal Forces Squadron	In active service
Tracker	P274	Ailsa Shipbuilding Company, Troon	1998	Faslane Patrol Boat Squadron	In active service
Raider	P275	Ailsa Shipbuilding Company	1998	Faslane Patrol Boat Squadron	In active service

== See also ==
- Harbour defence motor launch - World War II equivalent
- CB90-class fast assault craft
- Patrol Craft Fast - the "Swift Boats"
- AMPL-class interceptor boat - Indian patrol boats based off the P-2000 design

== Bibliography ==
- Beaver, Paul (1996). Britain's Modern Royal Navy. Patrick Stephens Ltd. ISBN 1-85260-442-5.
- Flack, Jeremy (1996). Today's Royal Navy in Colour. Greenwich Editions. ISBN 0-86288-089-0.
