= HMS Express (P163) =

Archer-class patrol vessel of the Royal Navy

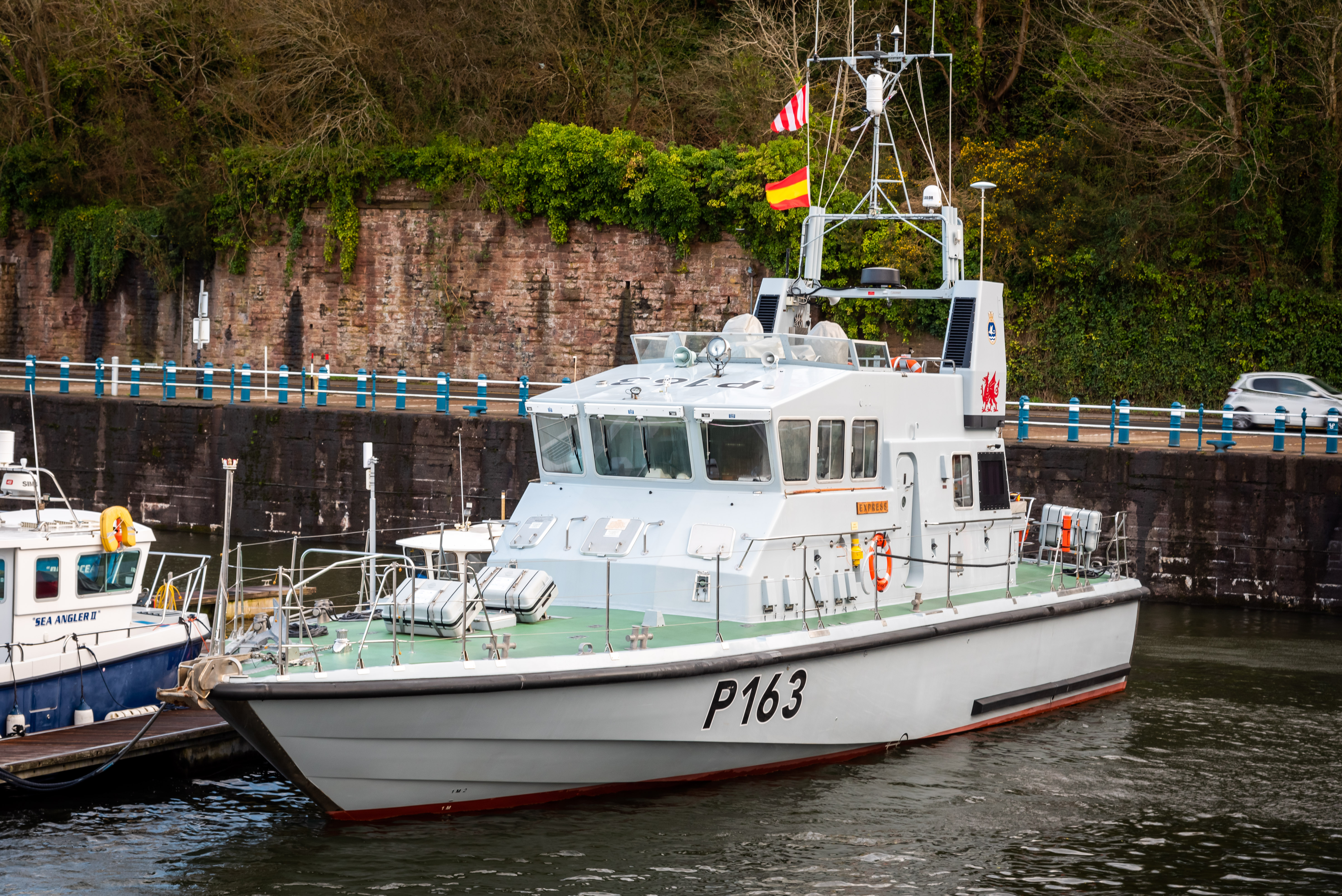
- HMS Express berthed at Penarth Marina, February 2020

History

United Kingdom
- Name: HMS Express
- Operator: Royal Navy
- Builder: Vosper Thornycroft
- Commissioned: 1988
- Identification: MMSI number: 235009920; Callsign: GABC; Pennant number: P163
- Status: In active service

General characteristics
- Class & type: Archer-class patrol vessel
- Displacement: 54 tonnes
- Length: 20.8 m (68 ft 3 in)
- Beam: 5.8 m (19 ft 0 in)
- Draught: 1.8 m (5 ft 11 in)
- Propulsion: 2 shafts, Rolls-Royce M800T diesels, 1,590 bhp (1,190 kW)
- Speed: 21 kn (39 km/h); 45 kn (83 km/h) (Hull design, but limited due to engine fitted)
- Range: 550 nmi (1,020 km)
- Complement: 16 (training) (Note: 5 ship's company, 1 training officer, 10 URNU students.); 12 (operational)
- Sensors & processing systems: Decca 1216 navigation radar
- Armament: 1 × Oerlikon 20 mm cannon on fo'c'sle ("for but not with"); 3 × General purpose machine guns (Note: When operational and not in URNU role.)

HMS Express is an Archer-class P2000-type patrol and training vessel of the Royal Navy.

Initially assigned to the Royal Naval Auxiliary Service, her hull was black rather than the grey colour normally used for Royal Navy warships. On transfer to the Royal Navy she retained the black colour until 2005. She is assigned to the Wales University Royal Naval Unit (URNU) from Cardiff, Swansea and South Wales Universities. The students are given the rank of officer cadet in the Royal Navy Reserve.

Up to ten students from Wales URNU can be accommodated on board, as well as five permanent ships company drawn from the Royal Navy.
