= HMS Trumpeter (P294) =

1988 Archer-class patrol and training vessel

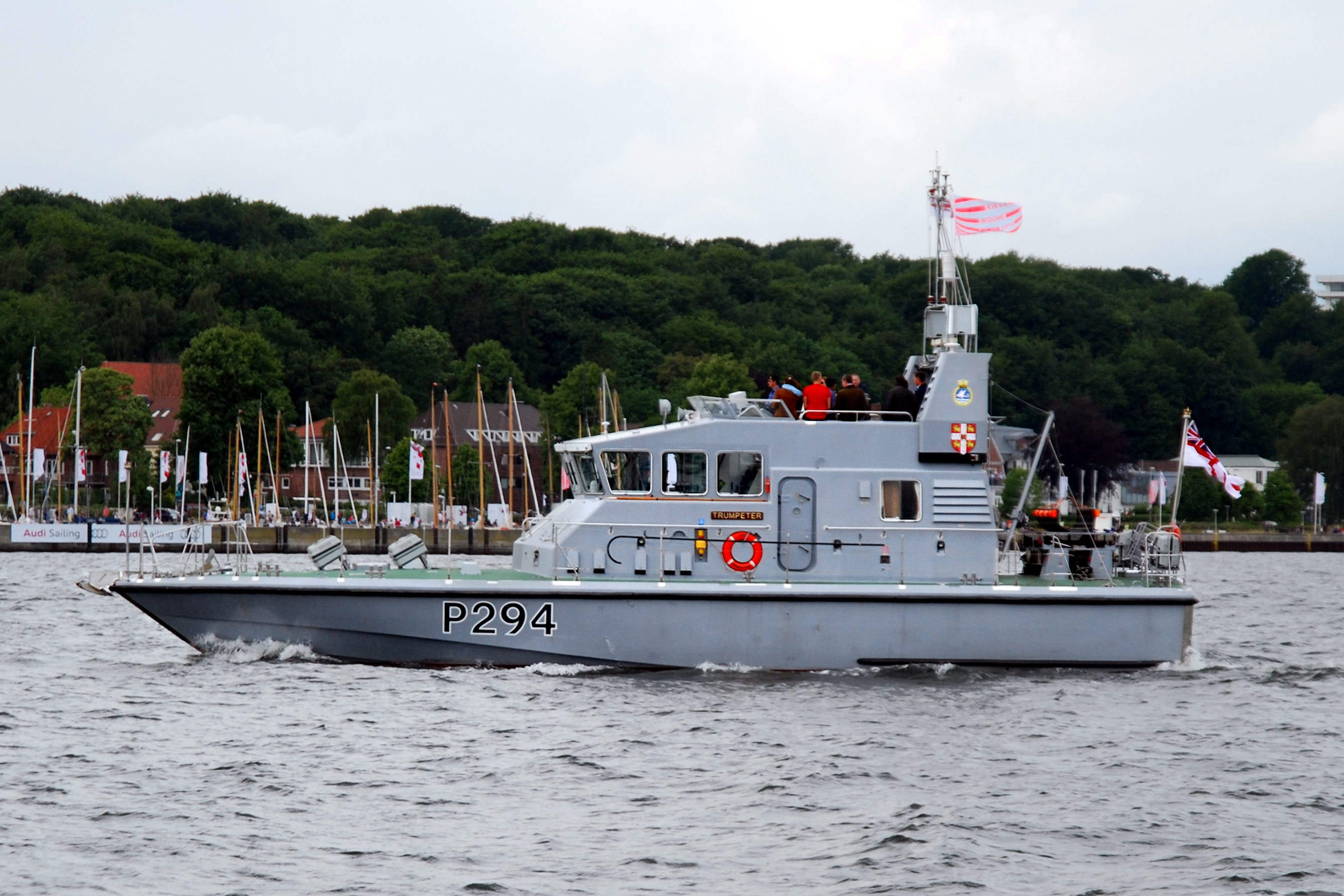
- HMS Trumpeter, 2012

History

United Kingdom
- Name: HMS Trumpeter
- Operator: Royal Navy
- Builder: Vosper Thornycroft
- Commissioned: 1988
- Identification: MMSI number: 232002978; Callsign: GAAZ; Pennant number: P294
- Motto: Vox Victoriae - The Sound of Victory
- Status: In active service
- Badge

General characteristics
- Class & type: Archer-class patrol vessel
- Displacement: 54 tonnes
- Length: 20.8 m (68 ft)
- Beam: 5.8 m (19 ft)
- Draught: 1.8 m (5 ft 11 in)
- Propulsion: 2 shafts, Cat C18 ACERT diesels
- Speed: 25 kn (46 km/h); 45 kn (83 km/h) (Hull design, but limited due to engine fitted)
- Range: 550 nmi (1,020 km)
- Complement: 18 (training) (Note: 5 ship's company, 1 training officer, 12 URNU students.); 12 (operational)
- Sensors & processing systems: Decca 1216 navigation radar
- Armament: 1 × Oerlikon 20 mm cannon on fo'c'sle ("for but not with"); 3 × General purpose machine guns (Note: When operational and not in URNU role.)

HMS Trumpeter is an Archer-class patrol vessel P2000-type patrol and training vessel of the British Royal Navy. Trumpeter is assigned to Cambridge University Royal Naval Unit, having previously been the training ship of the Bristol University Royal Naval Unit.

== Operational history ==
HMS Trumpeter was commissioned close to her builder's yard in Southampton, early in 1989 at HMS WESSEX the Solent Division RNR Unit based in the former Imperial Flying Boat base in Southampton Docks. As a small, well-equipped navigation training platform her role was introducing Young Officers and newly joined ratings to basic seamanship and life in a small warship whilst giving a first command opportunity to lieutenants who were working towards command of the division's main tender. This is still broadly the role of the P2000 class in all University Royal Naval Units. She then served in the Gibraltar Squadron alongside Ranger commencing 1991. With Ranger she was deployed on the Thames for the Thames Diamond Jubilee Pageant to assist in security and partake in the pageant, then later in the same year Trumpeter assisted in the security for the 2012 London Olympics.

In the early 2020s, Trumpeter, along with other Archer-class vessels, was given a more operational role as part of the reconstituted Coastal Forces Squadron. In early 2024, Trumpeter and three of her sister ships deployed to northern Norway as part of the NATO exercise "Steadfast Defender".

== See also ==
- Curriers' Company
