= For but not with =

Military term

In military usage, fit to receive or fitting "for but not with" describes a weapon or system which is called for in a design but not installed or is only partially installed during construction, with the installation completed later as needed. This can be done to reduce the vessel's build cost by not purchasing the system at the time of construction, as a method of future-proofing a design, or for security purposes. The term is usually used in regard to ships but sometimes extends to military vehicles, aircraft and other hardware.

Provision is made physically with power supply and data wiring to a hardpoint or through software for the installation of a weapon or system which is marked for purchase at a later date, with installation during the vehicle's modernisation or refit. Part of the justification for this design concept is the implicit assumption that in the event of the system being required (such as a war), there should be enough warning time to purchase the system, install it in the vehicle, and train operators in its use.

Fitting for but not with can range anywhere from leaving sufficient space for any future upgrades, to installing a weapon system during construction but not purchasing ammunition until it is needed.

== See also ==
- Fitted For Wireless
