= Lively Lady (yacht) =

36 foot wooden yacht

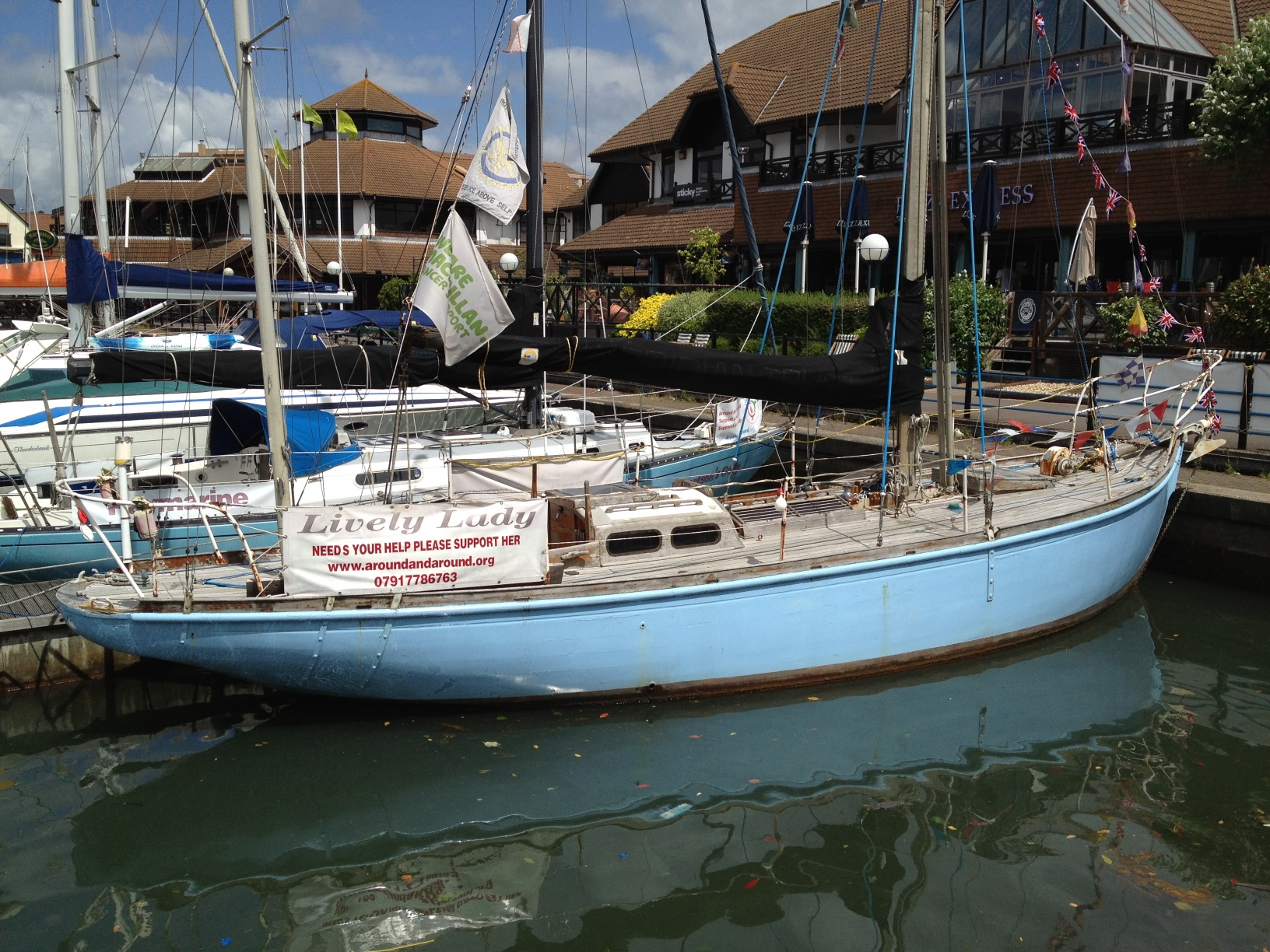
- Lively Lady in 2012
- Nation: United Kingdom
- Class: Yawl
- Sail no: 2105
- Designer(s): Frederick Shepherd
- Builder: Sydney Cambridge
- Launched: 1948, Calcutta
- Owner(s): Portsmouth City Council

Racing career
- Skippers: Alec Rose, Alan Priddy, 17 adult skippers

Specifications
- Type: Single-hull
- Displacement: 13.75 tons
- Length: 36 feet (11 m)
- Beam: 9.2 feet (2.8 m)
- Draft: 6.6 feet (2.0 m)
- Sail area: Bermuda rig
- Crew: 1 to 6

Notes
- Mizzen mast for staysail, teak construction

Lively Lady is a 38-foot Bermuda rigged wooden yawl built in 1948 in Calcutta and sailed single-handedly by Alec Rose across the Atlantic in 1964 and around the world in 1967-1968, for which latter feat he was knighted. The yacht subsequently fell into disrepair until in the early 21st century it was rescued by a charity, sailed around the world with volunteer crews in 2006–8, and continues to introduce sailing to young people.

== Construction and rig ==
Lively Lady was built of teak planking on grown paduak frames, which are stronger than teak. Her original design was by Frederick Shepherd, but this was substantially modified by S. J. P. Cambridge, the first owner, who built her in Calcutta with the help of two Indian cabinetmakers. Cambridge had studied boat design during the war, and Lively Lady was basic, but sturdy and stable. Her rig, later adapted by Alec Rose, who acquired her from Cambridge, was originally a Bermuda-rigged yawl, but described by Chatham Historic Dockyard in 2023 as a gaff cutter.

== Alec Rose ==
Alec Rose, who had learned single-handed sailing after the war, bought Lively Lady from her first owner in 1964 with the intention of taking part in the Transatlantic Race. Rose tasked Illingworth and Primrose to make some modifications, but these did not include increasing the sail area.

== Atlantic crossing ==
In 1964, Rose participated in the second single-handed transatlantic race. The race started at Plymouth, where Rose was photographed on board by Eileen Ramsay, the chronicler of sailing in post-war Britain. Rose finished in fourth place, but not having any means of communication on board, he did not know of his success until after he crossed the finish line.

Rose went back to Illingworth and Primrose and they converted Lively Lady to a yawl by adding a mizzenmast. No mizzen was set on this mast (it would interfere with the self-steering gear), but it allowed a mizzen staysail to be set forwards, which was helpful when reaching or sailing before the wind, because of the relatively heavy hull of the boat, especially in light conditions. They also increased the height of the mainmast by four feet. It was commented that the original designer may not have recognised her with the many changes made; by that time, Shepherd was a very old man.

== Global circumnavigation ==
When Rose heard that Francis Chichester intended to sail single-handedly around the world, he was keen to compete. He attempted to start his journey at approximately the same time as Chichester (sailing Gypsy Moth IV) in 1966, but mechanical failures and a collision off Ushant meant he had to postpone the event until the following year.

The voyage began on 16 July 1967. While he was away Rose's wife Dorothy ran their fruit and vegetable stall, displaying a map charting his progress. On 17 December, after 155 days and 14,500 miles, he arrived in Melbourne where he met his son who lived there. Among the people who came to watch Rose's arrival was Prime Minister Harold Holt, who disappeared later the same day after going for a swim. Rose stopped once more, an unplanned call into Bluff Harbour, New Zealand, to repair a damaged mast.

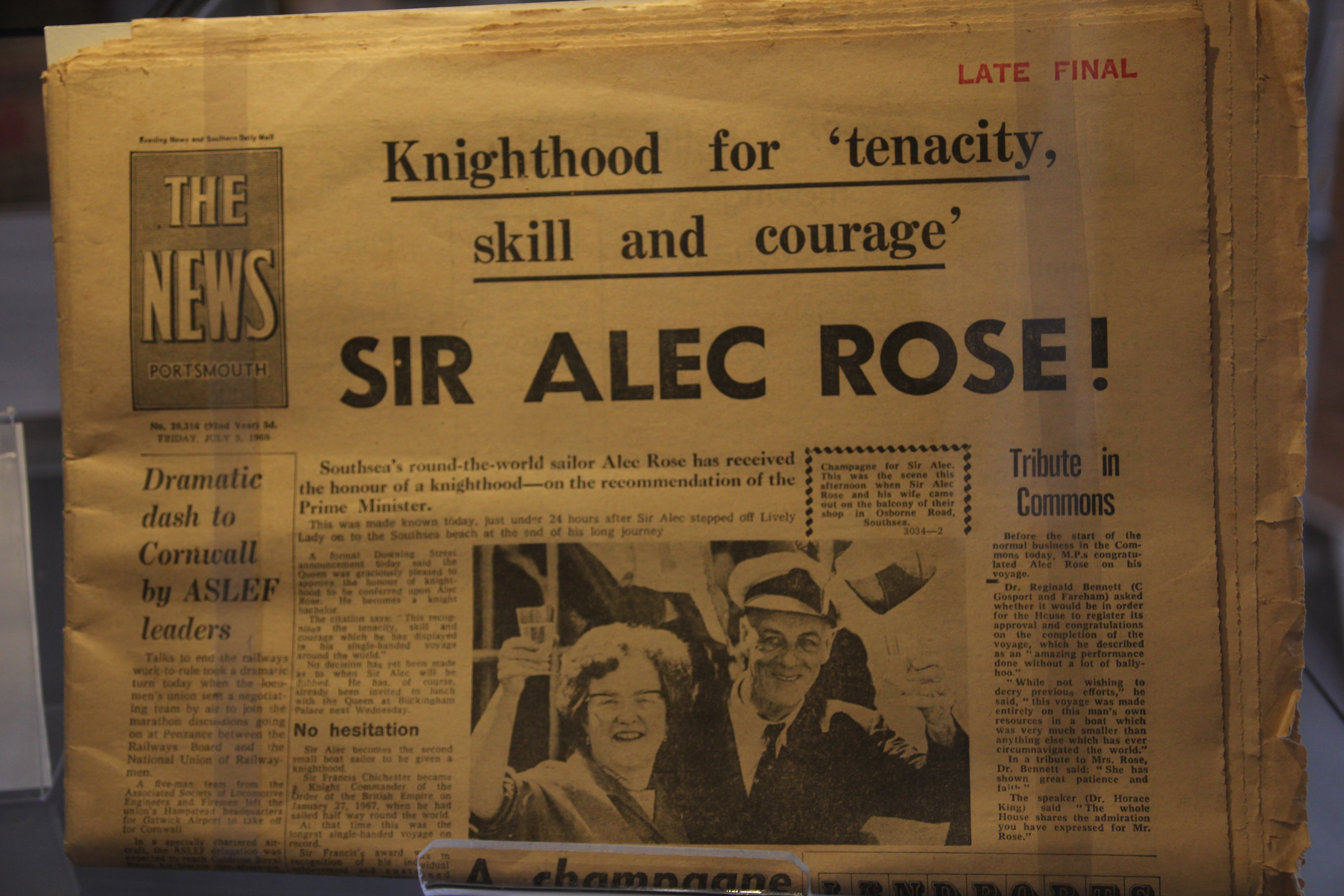
News of Rose's knighthood, 1968

The voyage was closely followed by the British and international press and Rose's landfall at 12.33pm in Southsea, Portsmouth, on 4 July 1968, 354 days after he set off, was met by cheering crowds of hundreds of thousands. It was 10 days before his 60th birthday. On 10 July 1968, he was made a Knight Bachelor. He was made a Freeman of the City of Portsmouth in the same year, was guest of honour at the Anglo-American Sporting Club gala evening at the London Hilton, and fêted with Lively Lady outside the Daily Mirror Building at Holborn Circus. He opened the Bamboo House Chinese restaurant in Southsea in 1968. He was granted the Freedom of the City of London in 1969.

Shepherd died aged 100 in 1969.

Rose's voyages are detailed in his book My Lively Lady. He wrote a children's version, Around the world with Lively Lady (1968) and another book My favourite tales of the sea (1969).

== Fate after circumnavigation ==
In 1984, Merseyside Maritime Museum acquired Edward D. Walker's painting entitled "'Lively Lady' rounding the Horn. In 1980, Lively Lady was in Liverpool. After Rose died in 1991, she was acquired by Portsmouth City Council, which leased her to The Meridian Trust, a charity to help disadvantaged young people. In 1998, Lively Lady was the first boat to enter the new marina at Port Solent.

== Second circumnavigation ==
Lively Lady was displayed at the 2005 London Boat Show.

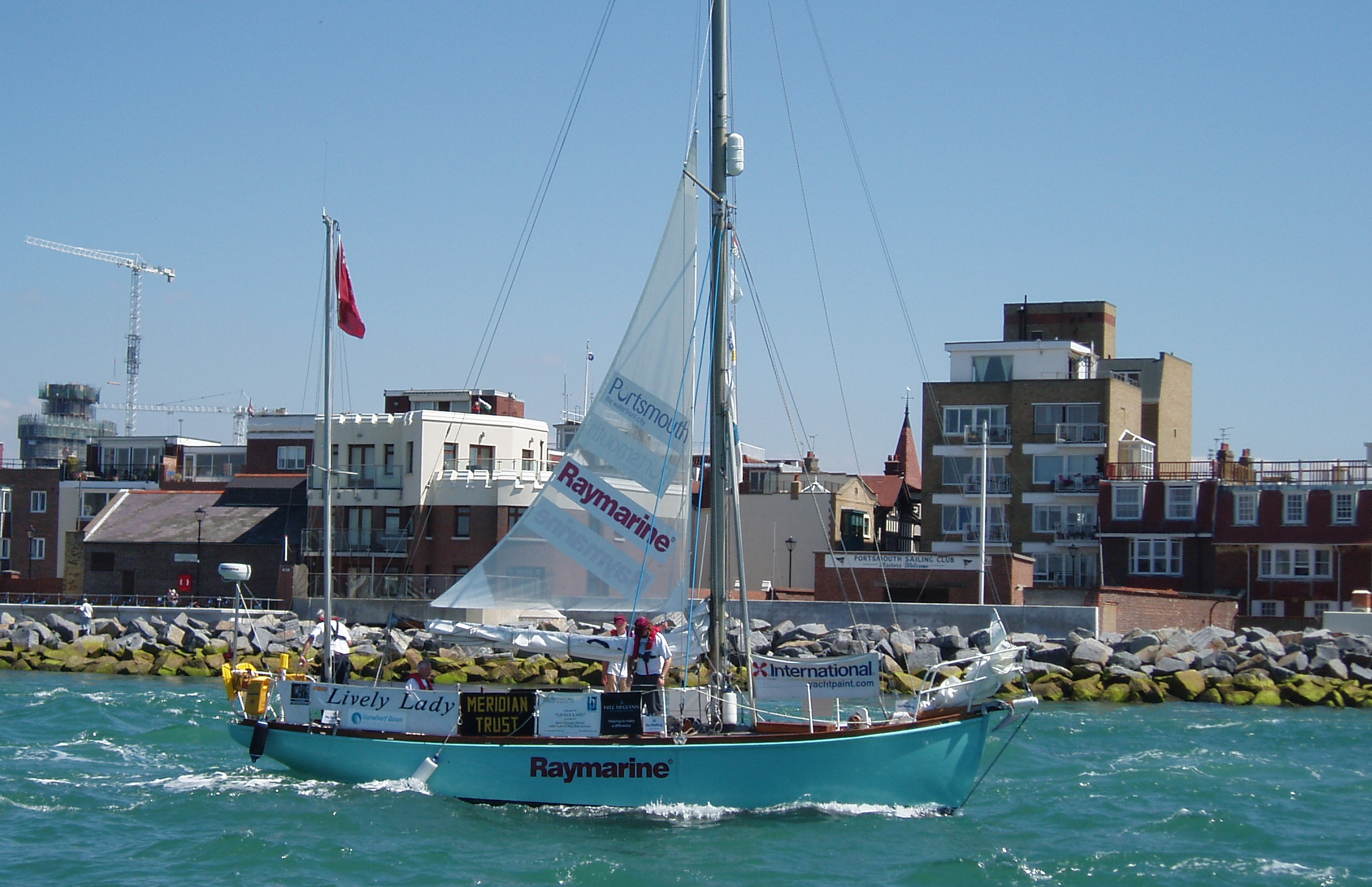
Lively Lady leaving Portsmouth Harbour in 2006

From 2004, Portsmouth sailor Alan Priddy, who attributed his passion for sailing to Rose, began executing a long-term plan for the boat. From 2006 to 2008 Priddy, founder and trustee of the Around and Around charity, circumnavigated the globe aboard Lively Lady, a journey of 28,042 nautical miles. The 60-year-old boat was crewed in stages by a group of 38 disadvantaged young adults, which to most of them was a "life changing" experience. When she left Portsmouth bound for Melbourne, Rose's son Alex commented that it was "the ultimate expression of my father's wish that the boat should be used in youth development through training." She arrived back home to a welcoming flotilla and hundreds of spectators, and many of those who had taken part marched through the streets of Portsmouth to more applause. Lively Lady was in 2009 leased to Around and Around for 25 years on condition that the charity would renovate her as well as maintain and use her for training.

== Re-fit ==
The charity Around and Around hoped that, after raising funds for a full refit, Lively Lady would undertake a third circumnavigation to celebrate the 50th anniversary of Rose's circumnavigation.

The boat was placed in Portsmouth Historic Dockyard's Boathouse No. 4 in 2015 as part of a boatbuilding training school, but no work was done on the boat, while Around and Around were being charged for storage, so in 2016, work started on restoration and extensive refitting of Lively Lady at Hayling Island Yacht Company on Hayling Island in Hampshire. Around and Around volunteers repaired the hull, built a new deck, rebuilt the wheelhouse and cabin, upgraded the engine and renewed the electrics. Her original colours were restored. It was completed in time to commemorate the 50th anniversary of Rose's circumnavigation, and in 2018 she was shown at the Hamble Classics Regatta, and ready for a future continuing to encourage young adults to get involved in sailing, especially those from disadvantaged backgrounds.

== Historic status ==
In August 2023, Lively Lady sailed to Chatham Historic Dockyard, which was to be her new home to continue her conservation. She visited St Katharine Docks in London for the classic boat show in September 2023. In 2025 she was on the heritage berth in No. 1 Basin, Chatham Historic Dockyard. Lively Lady returned to Portsmouth Historic Dockyard in July 2026 for Portsmouth's city-status centenary celebrations.

== Namesakes ==
A pub in Bracklesham, near Chichester, West Sussex, is named The Lively Lady after Rose's yacht, and Rose is celebrated by a pub in Port Solent.
