= Horsea =

Horsea may refer to:

- Horsea Island, an island in Portsmouth Harbour, England
- Horsea (Pokémon), a Pokémon species
