= Port Solent =

Area of Portsmouth, Hampshire, England

Coordinates: 50.842°N 1.100°W

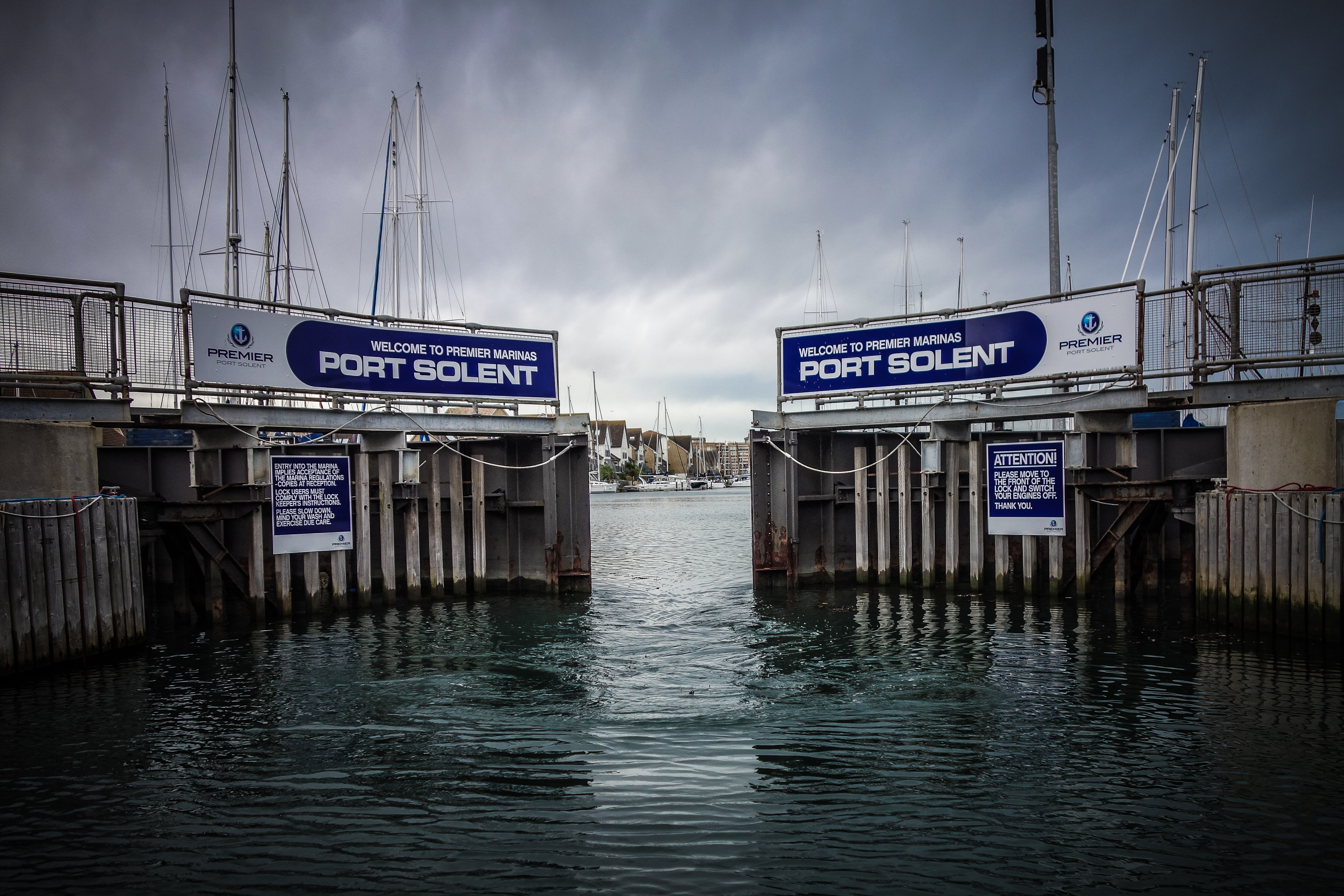
Port Solent Marina Lock Gates

Port Solent is the commercial business name of a housing and leisure development located in the Paulsgrove suburb of the English city of Portsmouth, Hampshire, comprising a marina, a housing estate, shopping and leisure facilities.

The Port Solent development was built during the late 1980s on reclaimed land taken from the east side of Paulsgrove Lake in Portsmouth Harbour, specifically between the north of Horsea Island and the shoreline of Paulsgrove Quay in Paulsgrove.

Facilities for residents and visitors include a multiscreen cinema, health club, and restaurants and shops along a precinct known as The Boardwalk. The marina is owned and managed by Premier Marinas.

Port Solent was officially opened on 29 July 1988 by Anne, Princess Royal. The first boat to use Port Solent was the 36-foot cutter Lively Lady, sailed by Sir Alec Rose (1908-1991).

Port Solent is politically within the Paulsgrove electoral ward and the Portsmouth North UK Parliament constituency.

The main entrance road junction (of Port Way and the A27 Southampton Road) into the Port Solent development is built almost exactly over the site of the former Paulsgrove Quay shoreline.

== Land reclamation ==
The land for the residential section of Port Solent and the nearby M275 motorway spur was reclaimed during the 1970s by draining the marshland and the eastern mudflat sections of the Paulsgrove Lake water channel within Portsmouth Harbour. The present-day grassy southern section of the development is a former Portsmouth City Council owned rubbish dump, which bridged the northern side of Horsea Island to the former Paulsgrove Lake area and was covered with grass turf when filled. There are many methane gas outlets situated to the south and at the southern edge of the site, allowing the gases occurring from the decomposing waste beneath the site to escape.
