= Alec Rose =

British sailor (1908–1991)

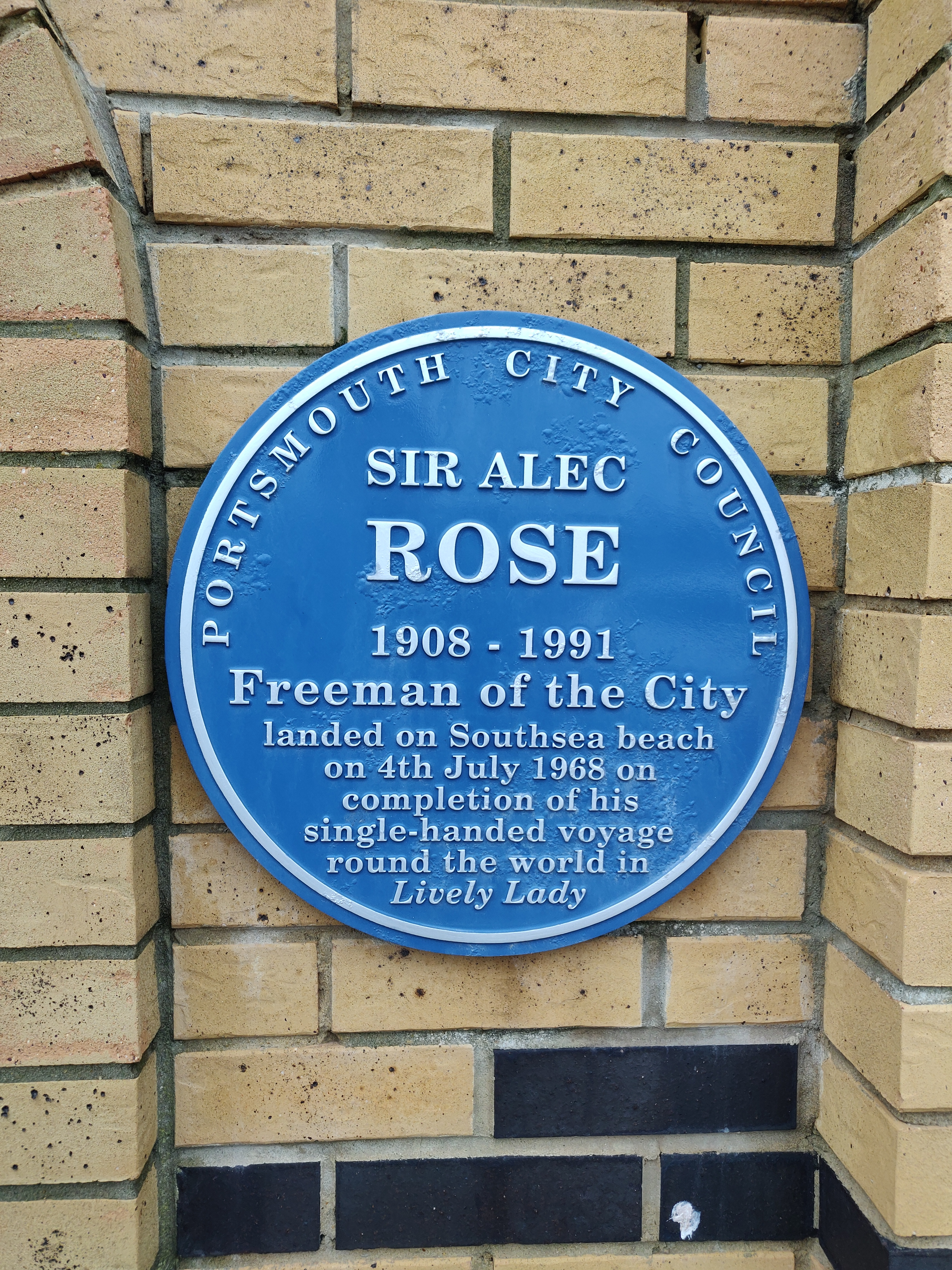
Blue plaque commemorating Alec Rose's circumnavigation in Lively Lady

Sir Alec Rose (13 July 1908 – 11 January 1991) was a nursery owner and fruit merchant in England. After serving in the Royal Navy during World War II, he developed a passion for amateur single-handed sailing. He took part in the second single-handed Atlantic race in 1964 and circumnavigated the globe single-handedly in 1967–68, for which he was knighted. His boat Lively Lady is still seaworthy and is used for sail training by a charity.

== Naval career ==
Alec Rose was born in Canterbury. During World War II he served in the Royal Navy as a diesel mechanic on a convoy escort, HMS Leith.

== Lively Lady ==
After the war, Rose learned to sail in a former ship's lifeboat before buying the 36-foot cutter Lively Lady second-hand. Lively Lady was built of teak planking on grown paduak frames. Her original design was by Frederick Shepherd, but this was substantially modified by S. J. P. Cambridge, the previous owner, who built her in Calcutta, with the help of two Indian cabinetmakers. Cambridge had studied boat design during the war, and Lively Lady was basic, but sturdy and stable.

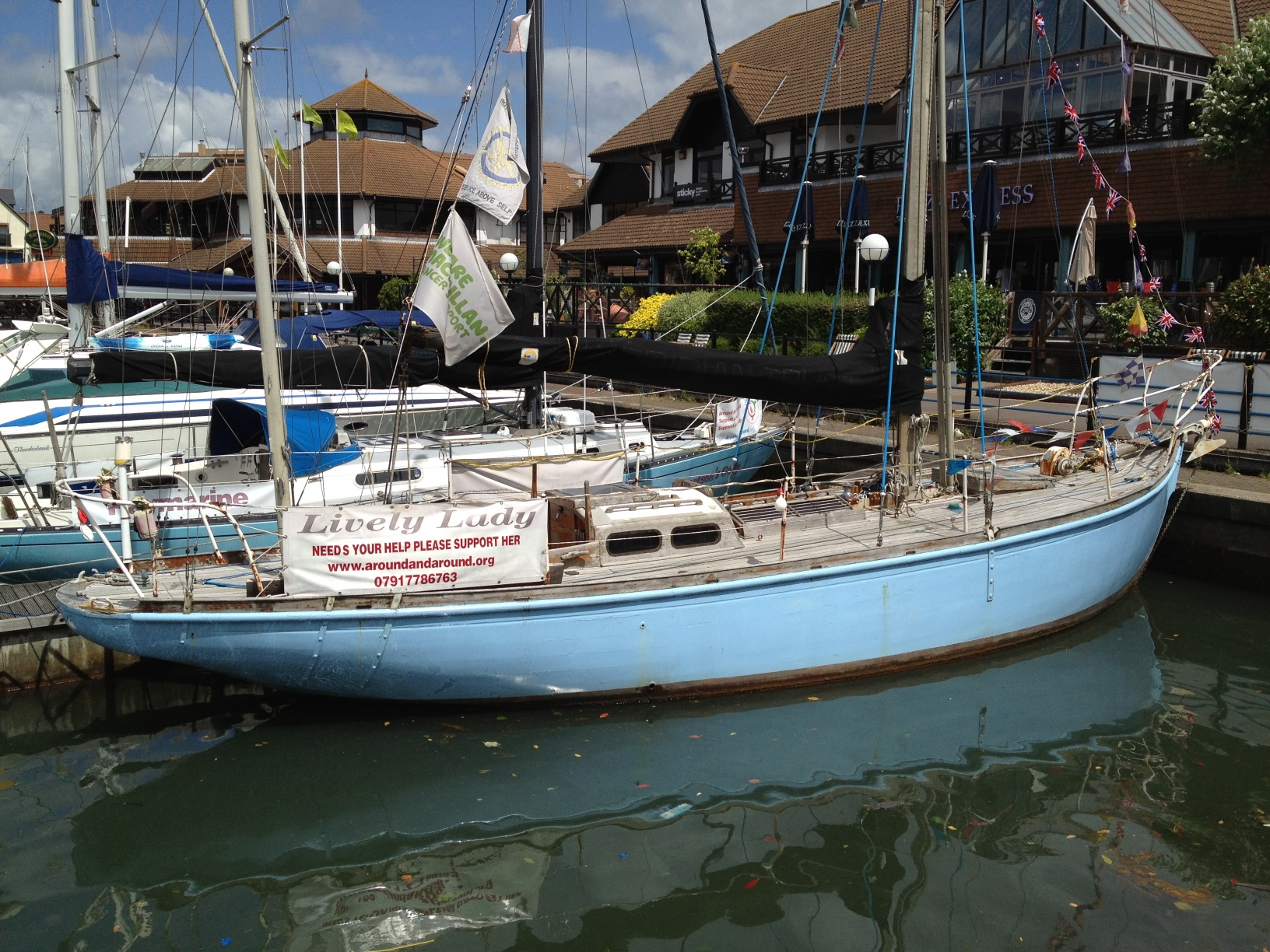
Lively Lady in 2012

In 2015, the charity "Around and Around" undertook a 25-year management of the yacht and restored and extensively refitted her in time to commemorate the 50th anniversary of Rose's circumnavigation. In the future she will continue to be used for getting young adults involved in sailing, especially those from disadvantaged backgrounds.

Lively Lady came up to St Katherine Docks in London for the classic boat show there in September 2023.

== Single-handed Atlantic crossing ==
Rose converted Lively Lady to a yawl by adding a mizzenmast. No mizzen was set on this mast (it would interfere with the self-steering gear), but it allowed a mizzen staysail to be set, which was helpful when reaching. In 1964, Rose participated in the second single-handed transatlantic race, finishing in fourth place. Not having any means of communication on board, he did not know of his success until after he crossed the finish line. The race started at Plymouth, where Rose was photographed on board by Eileen Ramsay, the chronicler of sailing in post-war Britain.

== Single-handed global circumnavigation ==
When Rose heard that Francis Chichester intended to sail single-handedly around the world, he was keen to compete. He attempted to start his journey at approximately the same time as Chichester (sailing Gypsy Moth IV) in 1966, but mechanical failures and a collision off Ushant meant he had to postpone the event until the following year.

The voyage began on 16 July 1967. While he was away Rose's wife Dorothy ran their fruit and vegetable stall, displaying a map charting his progress. On 17 December, after 155 days and 14,500 miles, he arrived in Melbourne where he met his son who lived there. Among the people who came to watch Rose's arrival was Prime Minister Harold Holt, who disappeared later the same day after going for a swim. Rose stopped once more, an unplanned call into Bluff Harbour, New Zealand, to repair a damaged mast.

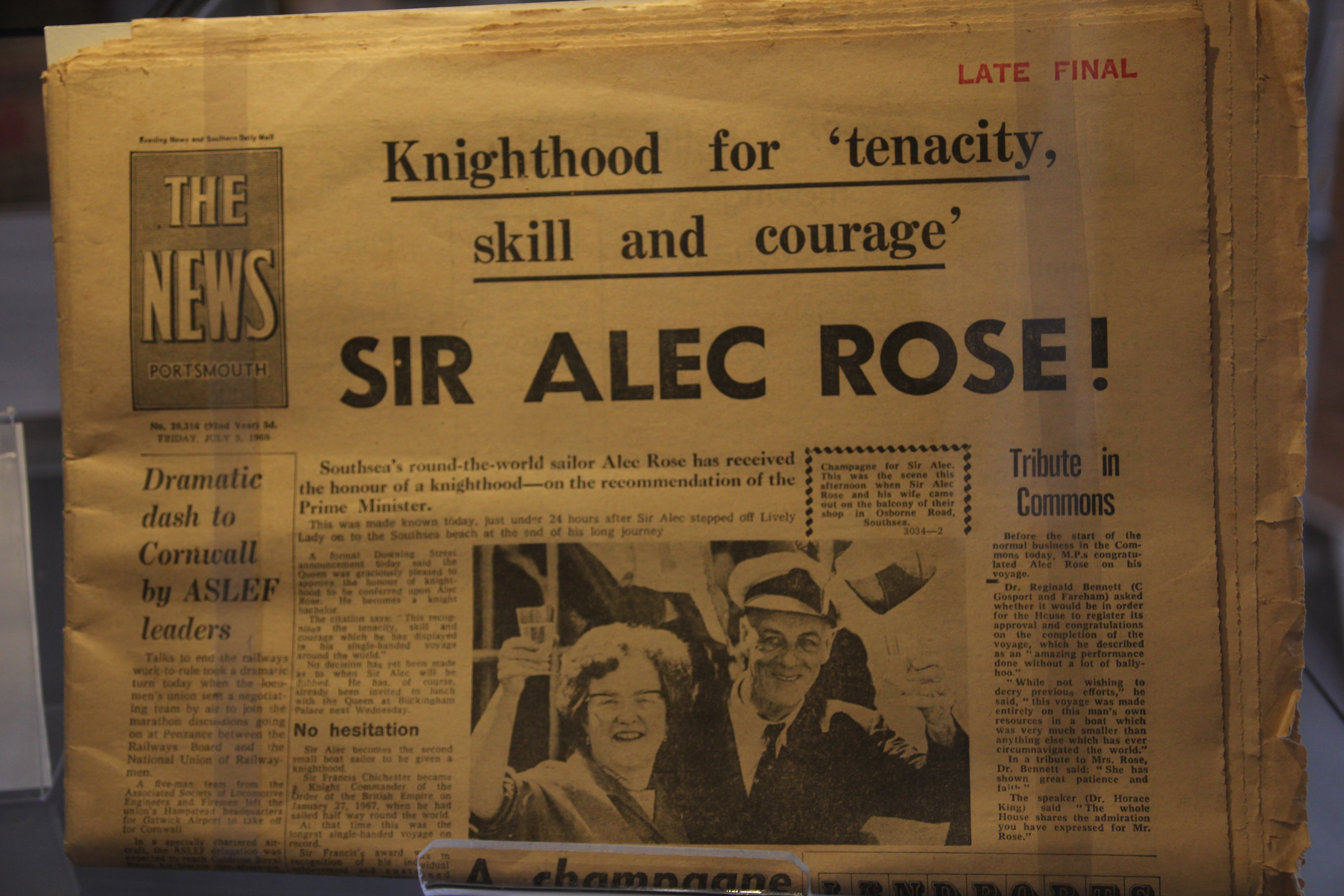
News of Rose's knighthood, 1968

The voyage was closely followed by the British and international press and Rose's landfall at 12.33pm in Southsea, Portsmouth, on 4 July 1968, 354 days after he set off, was met by cheering crowds of hundreds of thousands. It was 10 days before his 60th birthday. On 10 July 1968, he was made a Knight Bachelor. He was made a Freeman of the City of Portsmouth in the same year, was guest of honour at the Anglo-American Sporting Club gala evening at the London Hilton, and fêted with Lively Lady outside the Daily Mirror Building at Holborn Circus. He opened the Bamboo House Chinese restaurant in Southsea in 1968. He was granted the Freedom of the City of London in 1969.

Rose's voyages are detailed in his book My Lively Lady. He wrote a children's version, Around the world with Lively Lady (1968) and another book My favourite tales of the sea (1969).

== After the circumnavigation ==
In 1970, Sir Alec presented the RNLI's awards at their annual meeting in London.

A Look And Learn comic (27th March 1971) had a "Sir Alec Rose Adventure Week" competition. The prize included a day at sea on a Navy ship or yacht, a training session with a famous football team and a visit to an RAF station.

In 1973 he was given the honour of firing the starting gun for the first Whitbread Round the World Race. On 17 May 1975, he opened 5th Littlehampton Sea Scouts' HQ Gordon Hall in Lineside Way, Littlehampton, West Sussex.

Rose provided the foreword for the 1980 reprint of Brouscon's Tidal Almanac of 1546.

== Publications ==
- My Lively Lady, November 1968, Nautical Publishing Company. ISBN 0245595651.
- Around the world with Lively Lady, 1968, Geoffrey Chapman, London. ISBN 0225273128.
- My favourite tales of the sea, 1969, Nautical Publishing Company, Lymington, in association with George G. Harrap & Co. ISBN 0245598987.

== Personal life ==
Rose was born in Canterbury and was educated at Simon Langton Grammar School for Boys. In his book My Lively Lady Rose described himself as a shy youth and a loner, fascinated by nature and the sea. He preferred to be self-employed rather than take a regular job, which allowed him to spend the time (over several years) preparing his yacht for the trans-Atlantic race. Rose and his wife Dorothy ran a greengrocer's shop at 38 Osborne Road, Southsea.

Alec Rose died aged 82 on 11 January 1991 at Queen Alexandra Hospital, Portsmouth. At the time of his death he was Admiral of the Ocean Cruising Club, and in an obituary Tim Heywood, a founder member and past Commodore who had known Rose since 1966, described him as "the epitome of the breed of great seamen: quiet, reserved and humble". Rose, who was survived by his wife Dorothy, two sons and two daughters, was buried at Warblington, near Emsworth. He bequeathed Lively Lady to Portsmouth City Council.

== Legacy ==
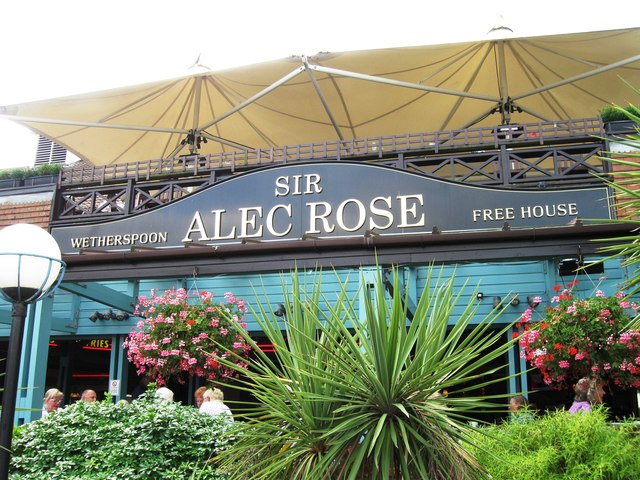
Sir Alec Rose pub, Port Solent

Alec Rose Lane in Portsmouth city centre is named after him, as is a Wetherspoon public house in Port Solent, Portsmouth and the 3rd Worthing Scout Groups 'Rose' Cub Pack. An elderly people's residence in Gosport bears his name. Sir Alec's sailing club Eastney Cruising Association in Portsmouth has a Cornish Pilot Gig named after him. There is a plaque commemorating his global circumnavigation near his landing point at Southsea. Rose gives his name to the RNSA Sir Alec Rose Trophy for Outstanding Single Handed achievement.

Lively Lady was displayed at the 2005 London Boat Show. A pub in Bracklesham, near Chichester, West Sussex, is named The Lively Lady after Rose's yacht.

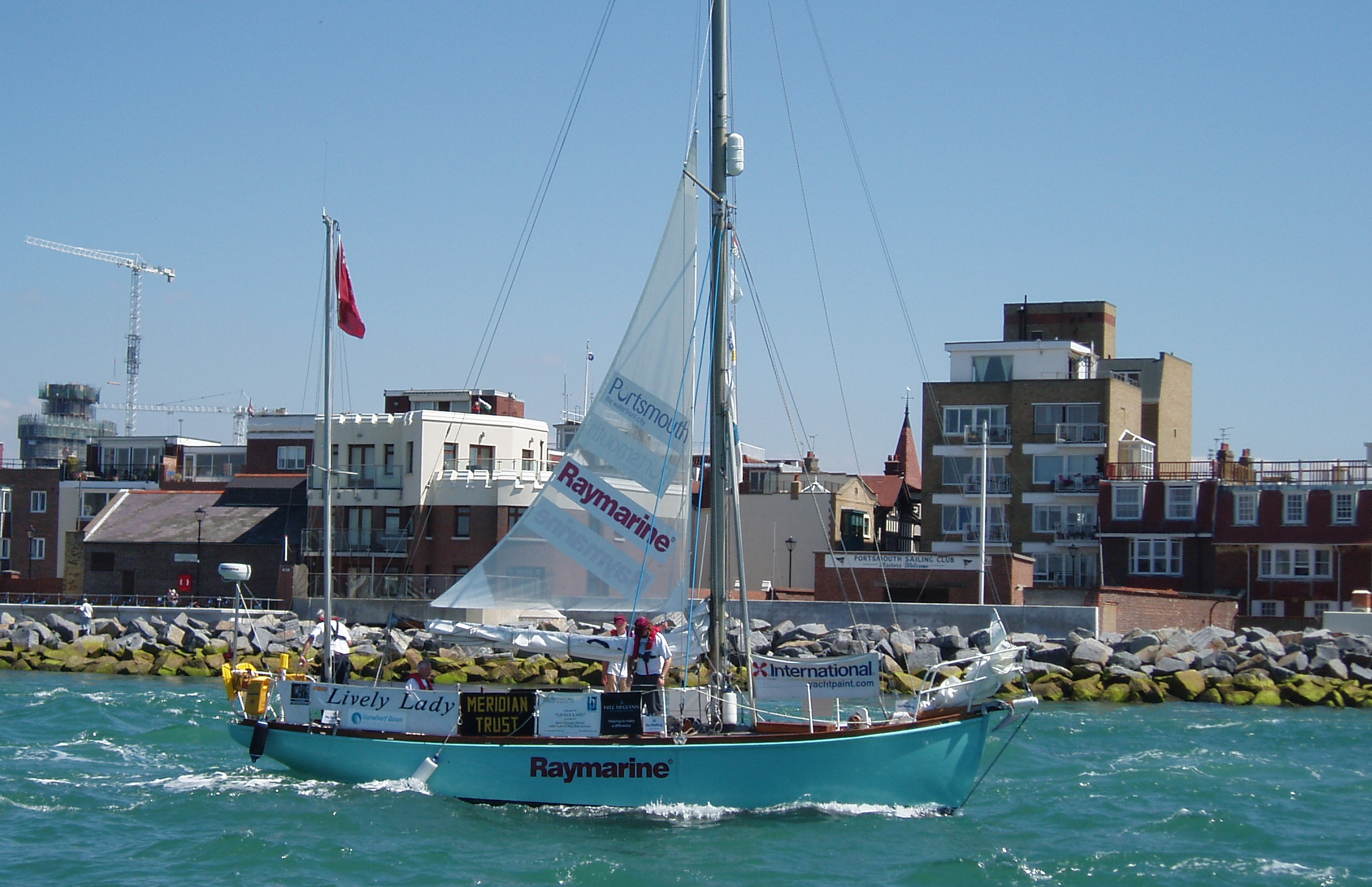
Lively Lady, 2006

From 2006 to 2008 Alan Priddy, founder of the Around and Around charity, circumnavigated the globe aboard Rose's yacht Lively Lady. The 60-year-old boat was crewed in stages by a group of 38 disadvantaged young adults. Which to most of them was "life changing", Priddy attributed his passion for sailing to Rose. Lively Lady was in 2009 leased to Around and Around for 25 years so the charity could maintain and use her for training. In 2011 the charity announced that, after a refit, Lively Lady would undertake another circumnavigation to celebrate the 50th anniversary of Rose's achievement. The charity restored and extensively refitted the yacht in time to commemorate the 50th anniversary of Rose's circumnavigation.
