= Chesham Grammar School =

Location
- White Hill; Chesham, Buckinghamshire, HP5 1BA; England; 51°42′32″N 0°36′01″W

Information
- Type: Academy Grammar School
- Established: 1947
- Specialist: Humanities
- Department for Education URN: 137091 Tables
- Ofsted: Reports
- Headteacher: Annmarie McNaney
- Gender: Co-educational
- Age: 11 to 18
- Enrolment: 1272
- Houses: Austen; Darwin; Franklin; Shakespeare
- Colours: Red, Black, White, Blue
- Website: http://www.cheshamgrammar.org

Chesham Grammar School is a co-educational academy school on White Hill, Chesham, Buckinghamshire. There are about 1,300 pupils aged between eleven and eighteen, including over 400 in the sixth form. In 2007, the Department for Education awarded the school specialist school status as a Humanities College. In August 2011 the school became an Academy.

== History ==
The school was founded in 1947 as the Chesham Technical School - a result of the Education Act 1944 which set up the tripartite arrangements of grammar, technical and secondary modern schools. The all-boys' school was originally housed in only one building, which is now the sixth form block known as "The Curtis Centre". In 1961, the school became known as Chesham Technical High School. In 1970, the school changed its name to Chesham High School as it moved away from its technical roots. The name of the school changed to Chesham Grammar School on 7 May 2010. The rebranded CGS underwent expansion. The school was rated outstanding in all categories by OFSTED in March 2014.

=== Headteachers ===
- Sidney Chapman (1947–1966)
- Paddy Evans (1966–1967)
- Ken Stokes (1967–1992)
- Tim Andrew (1992–2007)
- Nigel Fox (2005–2006) (acting during Tim Andrew's sabbatical)
- Philip Wayne (2007–2015)
- Annmarie McNaney (2015–present)

=== Facilities ===
Between 1980 and 2010, there was an expansion of the school, including a new maths block, a textiles block, an art block, expansion of the English block, a new library and a new drama/psychology block. In 2015, the sixth form centre, located in the original building, was expanded and reopened as the Curtis Centre.

=== The Prime Minister's Global Fellowship ===
Pupils attained places on the Prime Minister's Global Fellowship programme in the inaugural year 2008, and in 2009 had two more successful applicants.

== Admissions and school performance ==
Admission to the school is brokered through Buckinghamshire County Council, which operates a selective secondary education system throughout the county. Pupils have to achieve a mark of 121 or above in the 11-plus to be eligible to attend the school. The school's catchment area broadly covers the whole of Chiltern District area which includes the towns of Amersham, Chalfont St Giles, Chalfont St Peter and Chesham, and larger villages such as Great Missenden and Little Chalfont. A significant proportion of the intake also comes from Hertfordshire. As Chesham Station is a terminus on the Metropolitan Line of the London Underground, pupils also travel in from North London. The school's progress profile showed that these pupils performed prior to 2013 at a comparatively similar level at GCSE and A level.

== Notable alumni ==
- Conor Dunne, cyclist
- Katy Dunne, tennis player
- Elspeth Fowler, cricketer
- Judith Gough, diplomat
- Alex Hales, cricketer
- Nick Keynes, bass player
- Eileen Ramsay, maritime photographer.
- Yashvardhan Kumar Sinha, Indian diplomat
- Eleanor Thom, writer
