= List of Spain women Twenty20 International cricketers =

This is a list of Spain women Twenty20 International cricketers. A Women's Twenty20 International (WT20I) is an international cricket match between two representative women's teams. A T20I is played under the rules of Twenty20 cricket. In April 2018, the International Cricket Council (ICC) granted full international status to Twenty20 women's matches played between member sides from 1 July 2018 onwards. Spain women played their first WT20I on 5 May 2022 against Austria during the 2022 France Women's T20I Quadrangular Series.

The list is arranged in the order in which each player won her first Twenty20 cap. Where more than one player won her first Twenty20 cap in the same match, those players are listed alphabetically by surname.

== Key ==
General

- ‡ – Captain
- † – Wicket-keeper
- First – Year of debut
- Last – Year of latest game
- Mat – Number of matches played

Batting

- Runs – Runs scored in career
- HS – Highest score
- Avg – Runs scored per dismissal
- * – Batsman remained not out
- 50 – Number of half centuries

Bowling

- Balls – Balls bowled in career
- Wkt – Wickets taken in career
- BBI – Best bowling in an innings
- Ave – Average runs per wicket

Fielding

- Ca – Catches taken
- St – Stumpings affected

== Players ==
Statistics are correct as of 31 July 2026.

Spain women T20I cricketers
General					Batting				Bowling				Fielding		Ref
No.	Name	First	Last	Mat	Runs	HS	Avg	50	Balls	Wkt	BBI	Ave	Ca	St	Ref
1	Aliza Saleem	2022	2024	5	7	6	3.50	0	48	7	5/6	2.14	–	–	
2	Amy Brown-Carrera	2022	2026	28	297	73*	19.80	2	325	13	2/1	23.53	14	0	
3	Elspeth Fowler‡	2022	2025	22	186	44	18.60	0	–	–	–	–	13	0	
4	Jaspreet Kaur	2022	2022	8	14	11	3.50	0	126	3	1/18	55.66	2	0	
5	Simranjit Kaur	2022	2022	1	0	0	0.00	0	24	1	1/25	25.00	0	0	
6	Muskan Naseeb	2022	2025	11	26	10	5.20	0	30	2	2/12	11.50	0	0	
7	Rabia Iqbal	2022	2022	8	3	3*	3.00	0	81	4	3/25	36.25	0	0	
8	Rabia Mushtaq	2022	2026	15	0	0	0.00	0	193	7	2/12	35.57	1	0	
9	Tashiba Mirza†	2022	2024	16	13	8	3.25	0	1	1	1/0	0.00	5	5	
10	Uswa Syed	2022	2026	28	227	46	16.21	0	527	35	4/24	13.22	9	0	
11	Zenab Iqbal	2022	2022	6	2	2	2.00	0	44	1	1/14	84.00	0	0	
12	Hifsa Butt	2022	2022	3	5	5	2.50	0	–	–	–	–	0	0	
13	Memoona Riaz	2022	2025	12	5	3*	–	0	97	7	2/12	11.85	2	0	
14	Wania Malik	2022	2022	7	5	4*	2.50	0	78	8	3/18	11.12	2	0	
15	Naomi Hillman-Bermejo	2022	2026	24	646	100*	71.77	1	413	27	4/10	13.22	6	0	
16	Payal Chilongia	2022	2026	19	90	33	18.00	0	222	13	3/17	15.38	4	0	
17	Samaia Basharat	2024	2025	6	2	1*	2.00	0	24	1	1/15	22.00	0	0	
18	Andrea Davidson-Soler	2024	2025	14	246	70*	35.14	2	180	5	1/0	29.20	9	0	
19	Katerina Frost	2024	2026	14	199	88	33.16	1	102	4	2/13	27.00	3	0	
20	Alexis Hartley	2024	2026	18	398	73	39.80	2	90	4	2/6	21.25	5	0	
21	Justyne Smagacz	2024	2024	3	1	1*	–	0	–	–	–	–	1	0	
22	Deepa Chukkapalli-Llinares	2024	2026	9	86	33	21.50	0	142	9	4/49	20.44	1	0	
23	Aneesa Azmat	2024	2024	2	0	0	0.00	0	30	2	2/8	6.50	1	0	
24	Olivia Bennett-Baradad	2024	2024	2	–	–	–	–	36	2	2/16	10.00	0	0	
25	Amelia Jones †	2025	2026	9	81	39*	20.25	0	–	–	–	–	2	1	
26	Olivia Gwilliam Lopez	2026	2026	6	–	–	–	–	24	0	–	–	1	0	
27	Sabela Velazquez †	2026	2026	5	0	0	0.00	0	–	–	–	–	1	2	
28	Maria Zamorano	2026	2026	5	–	–	–	–	65	1	1/34	120.00	0	0	
29	Mardiya Mohammad	2026	2026	2	–	–	–	–	18	1	1/33	46.00	0	0	
