= Alan Priddy =

British power boat sailor and adventurer (born 1953)

- Born: 7 April 1953 (age 73); Portsmouth, Hampshire, England
- Occupation: Sailor
- Known for: Nautical record setter, fundraiser

Alan Priddy (born 7 April 1953) is a British power boat sailor and adventurer who has set several boating world records. Priddy attempted to circumnavigate the world in a rigid-hulled inflatable boat (RIB) in 2002, and in 2008 successfully completed a circumnavigation by yacht. He has also navigated a RIB around Scotland, Ireland, Britain and across the Bay of Biscay. He set a world RIB record in 2003 for crossing the Atlantic in 103 hours.

As of 2012, Priddy had recorded 37 world records, and 12 British national records. Boats he has sailed and raced include Fireballs, Finns, Shearwater catamarans, Enterprises, Wayfarers, Toppers and yachts.

== Early life ==
Priddy was born in Portsmouth, Hampshire. He started sailing at eight years old and owned a motorised dinghy at the age of eleven.

== Career ==
=== 1990 to 1996 ===
Alan Priddy took part in several record-breaking journeys around Scotland (1990), Britain (1992), Ireland (1993) and in the Bay of Biscay (1996).

=== Atlantic Challenge 1997 ===
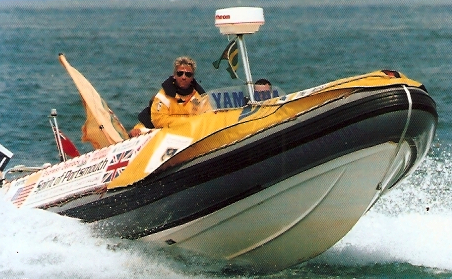
Alan Priddy on Spirit of Portsmouth, 1997

On Sunday 22 June 1997, Alan Priddy, Vic Palmer, Jan Falkowski and Steve Lloyd set out to cross the Atlantic in Spirit of Portsmouth—a four-year-old 7.4 m (24 ft) Ribtec rigid inflatable with a single 165 hp Yamaha inboard diesel engine. The journey took them from Portsmouth, New Hampshire, USA to Portsmouth, Hampshire, UK, stopping on the way in Nova Scotia, Newfoundland, Greenland, Iceland and Northern Ireland. The average leg was more than 500 nautical miles with the longest one planned to be nearly 700 nautical miles and scheduled to take 35 hours non-stop. However, the trip from Iceland to Weymouth took 100 hours with stops for fuel in Barra and Bangor.

=== London-Monaco 1998 ===
In 1998, Priddy and a crew travelled in the RIB Spirit of Portsmouth from London to Monaco. The 2,100-mile route went down the Thames Estuary, along the length of the Channel to Guernsey, across the Bay of Biscay to Spain, into the Mediterranean and past Gibraltar to Monaco. The team was backed up by two road crews. They completed the voyage in 99 hours 19 minutes 15seconds. The Royal Yachting Association did not ratify the record as they had not been invited to start the race.

=== Britain 2000 ===
In June 2000, Priddy and his crew circumnavigated the British Isles in five days, six hours and five minutes. This was a trial-run of the RIB Spirit of Cardiff in preparation for a planned circumnavigation of the world.

=== Around the world 2002 ===
Priddy, Clive Tully, Alan Carter and Steve Lloyd attempted to circumnavigate the world in the custom-built RIB Spirit of Cardiff which was specifically designed for endurance. The route encompassed 21 countries and nearly 25,000 miles and was scheduled for 75 days. At that time, Spirit of Cardiff was one of the largest RIBs in the world with an overall length of 10 metres (33 feet). This large size allowed a fully enclosed cabin on board to provide the team with shelter.

They left Cardiff on 31 March 2002. The voyage ran into difficulties and was prematurely concluded when Lloyd suffered heart problems 350 miles from Newfoundland and required a helicopter airlift to Canada.

In September 2002, Priddy planned to return Spirit of Cardiff across the Atlantic. However, the boat's engine compartment had become flooded and the bilge pumps were ineffective. Priddy abandoned the boat in Canada.

=== Soltron Atlantic Challenge ===
In 2003, Priddy attempted to cross from St. John's, Newfoundland to Cape Wrath in Scotland in less than 100 hours. The Spirit of was refurbished and became The Jolly Sailor. At 1342 local, 1512 GMT on 27 July 2003 Priddy, Jan Falkowski, Clive Tully and Canadian Egbert Walters embarked. With a brief fuel stop in Nanortalik harbour (Greenland) after being battered by 50 knot winds, they headed across the Denmark Strait towards Iceland onto a further fuel stop at the island of Heimaey, past Cape Wrath (Scotland) on to Bangor (Northern Ireland). Priddy beat his previous time but did not set a world record, but it was the fastest transatlantic crossing by a RIB. After an overnight stop, they continued down the Irish Sea and returned to Portsmouth on 9 September.

In 2004, Priddy attempted to return the Jolly Sailor to Newfoundland (Canada) to be used by charitable organisations but the boat was hit by a large wave and sank. The crew was rescued.

=== Lively Lady Project ===
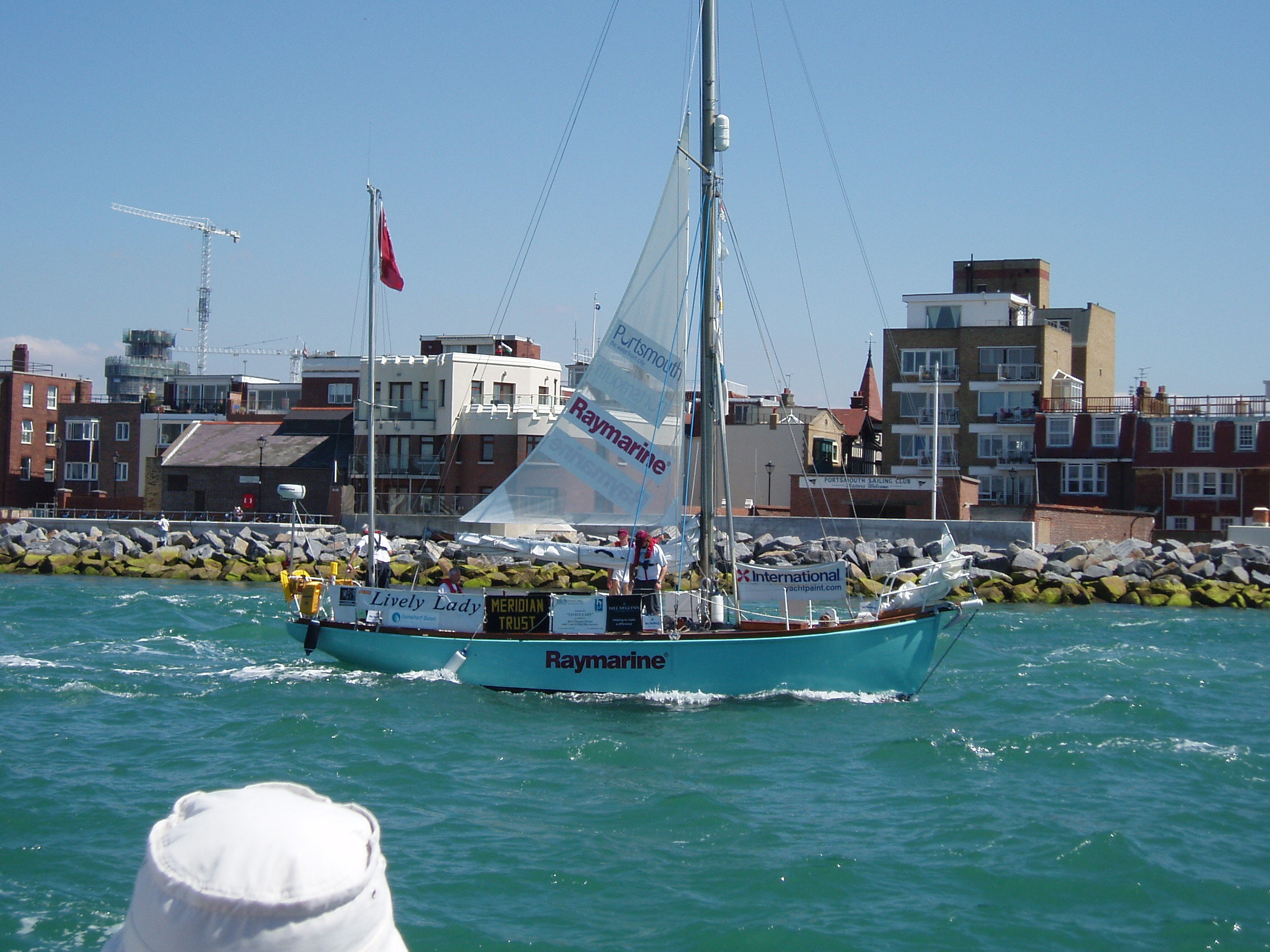
Lively Lady leaving Portsmouth in 2006

From 2006 to 2008, Priddy circumnavigated the world aboard Sir Alec Rose's yacht Lively Lady. The 36-foot, 60-year-old, sailing vessel was crewed by a group of 38 disadvantaged young adults. The voyage began in Portsmouth and finished there on 5 July 2008.

Priddy continued the project as the charity "Around and Around" with graduates serving as mentors for new crew participants on future world circumnavigations. In 2009 Priddy was leased Lively Lady by Portsmouth City Council for 25 years for her to be maintained and used by the charity. The charity restored and extensively refitted the yacht to commemorate the 50th anniversary of Rose's circumnavigation.

=== Full Circle powerboat circumnavigation project ===
In 2015 Priddy confirmed that an attempt to break the powerboat circumnavigation record would be made after trials of the purpose-built £5.5m, 80 feet (24 m) powerboat. In April 2015 Priddy announced plans to offer places on the project to Blesma, a group of wounded service personnel who have formed a powerboat racing team. The project was placed in jeopardy in 2015 when one of the sponsors withdrew, but replacement funding was subsequently secured to put the project, code name Team Britannia, back on track for the record attempt. In the meantime, fundraising continued. In 2020, the boat was launched at Hayling Island, mostly complete and with engines installed. In 2025, the build was completed, named Spirit of Challenge, and in Hayling Island Harbour, where the project, under the name Full Circle, aims to demonstrate advances in communication, marine research and a sustainable future for boating.

== Awards ==
In 2002, Priddy was given a Special Achievement Award by the British Inflatable Boat Owners' Association. In 2008, Priddy received a We Can Do It Special Achievement Award and as a Rotarian has been made a Paul Harris Fellow for his work with disadvantaged young adults. In July 2017 he was awarded an Honorary Doctorate by the University of Portsmouth.
