= Elspeth Fowler =

Spanish cricketer (born 1992)

Personal information
- Full name: Elspeth Marinha Compton Fowler
- Born: 14 August 1992 (age 34); Northampton, England
- Nickname: Hermione Granger
- Batting: Right-handed
- Bowling: Right-arm medium

International information
- National side: Spain
- T20I debut (cap 3): 5 May 2022 v Austria
- Last T20I: 29 Many 2025 v Italy

Domestic team information
- Years: Team
- 2010: Buckinghamshire
- 2016: Cambridgeshire

Career statistics
Competition	WT20I
Matches	22
Runs scored	186
Batting average	18.60
100s/50s	0/0
Top score	44
Catches/stumpings	13/0
- Source: ESPNCricinfo, 30 May 2025

Elspeth Marinha Compton Fowler (born 14 August 1992) is an English-born cricketer resident in Spain, who plays for the Spanish women's national cricket team as a right-handed batter. In May 2022, she captained Spain in its debut Women's Twenty20 International (WT20I) against Austria.

== Early life and education ==
Born at Northampton, England, she was raised at Chesham, Buckinghamshire. At the age of 8, she first attended Sunday morning sessions at her local cricket club, where she was enthused by the coaches.

From 2003 until 2010, Fowler attended Chesham High School (now Chesham Grammar School). In 2005, she played for Buckinghamshire Girls Under-13 team, and then from 2006 through 2008 she progressed through the County Girls Under-17 and Under-19 teams.

In 2010, Fowler went up to Pembroke College, Cambridge, where she read Modern and Medieval Languages, graduating in 2014 as BA (proceeding MA).

Fowler played for the Cambridge University Cricket Club, being awarded Cambridge half blues in 2011, 2012 and 2014; she also represented her college at basketball and played in the Cambridge Philharmonic Orchestra and Philharmonia.

== Domestic career ==
In 2010, Fowler was selected to play for Buckinghamshire CCC 1st XI. In 2016, she played two Women's Twenty20 Cup matches for Cambridgeshire CCC.

Since 2019, she has played for the La Manga Torrevieja Cricket Club, in the region of Murcia, southeastern Spain. In November 2019, while touring with the LMTCC men's team in Cártama, she helped bowl the team to victory in a weekend tournament.

In 2020, Fowler was appointed Director of Women's Cricket for Cricket Spain, in which capacity she is involved in training women cricketers. In July 2021, she made her captaincy debut, at the helm of LMTCC's Development XI, in a 40-over match against Torre-Pacheco CC at the La Manga Club Ground.

Also in 2021, she played for Team White in Cricket Catalonia's Women's T10 tournament.

== International career ==
On 5 May 2022, Fowler made her WT20I debut for, and also captained, Spain against Austria in the first match of the 2022 France Women's T20I Quadrangular Series, held at Dreux Sport Cricket Club, Dreux, France. The match was also Spain's first ever WT20I, and Fowler top-scored hitting 26 runs off 36 balls.

The following day, 6 May 2022, against Jersey, Fowler scored 29 runs off 46 balls. She did even better in a second match against Austria on 7 May 2022, with 44 in 50 balls, and in Spain's final match of the tournament, against France on 8 May 2022, with 42* in 58 balls. She finished the tournament as the leading run-scorer, with 141 runs, and with a WT20I batting average of 47.00. The Spanish team did not win any matches but, according to Cricket Spain's website, "... took positives from all the four games they played in."

== Off the field ==
Since 2016, Fowler works in Murcia as an account manager for G's Group, a fresh produce business headquartered in East Anglia, England.

Fowler's cricketing nickname, Hermione Granger, came courtesy of her then-new teammates at La Manga Torrevieja in 2019. While on cricket tours, she is accompanied by her mascot, a stuffed toy monkey named Crookshanks.

== See also ==
- Cricket España
- Spain Women Twenty20 International cricketers
