= Horsea Island =

Island in Portsmouth Harbour, England

Map showing the location of Horsea Island within Hampshire.

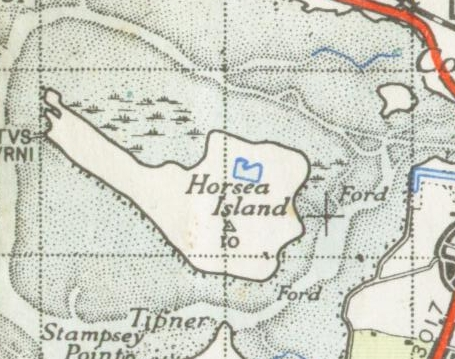
Ordnance Survey map of Horsea Island, 1945; detail omitted for security reasons.

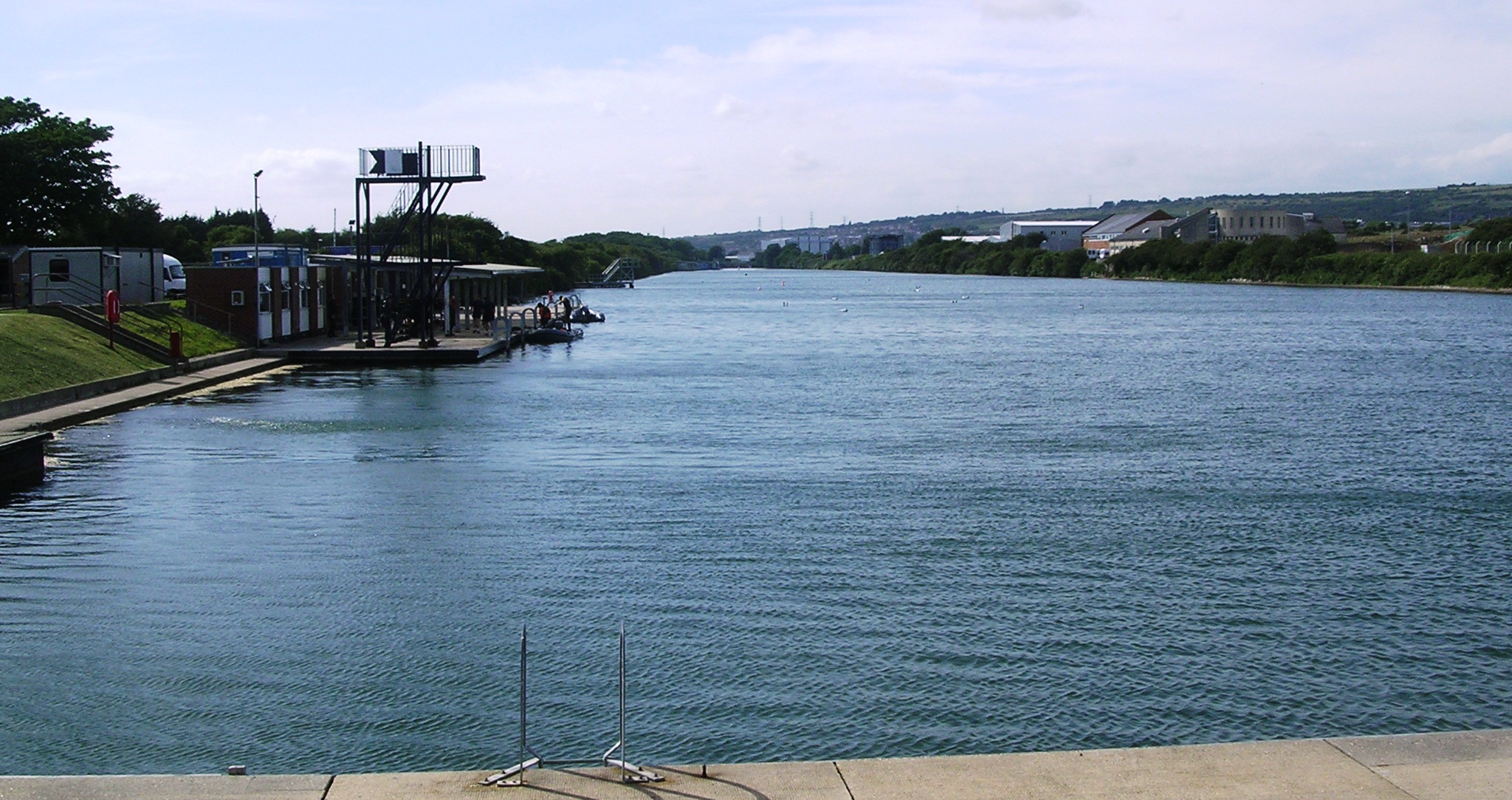
Horsea Lake, looking west

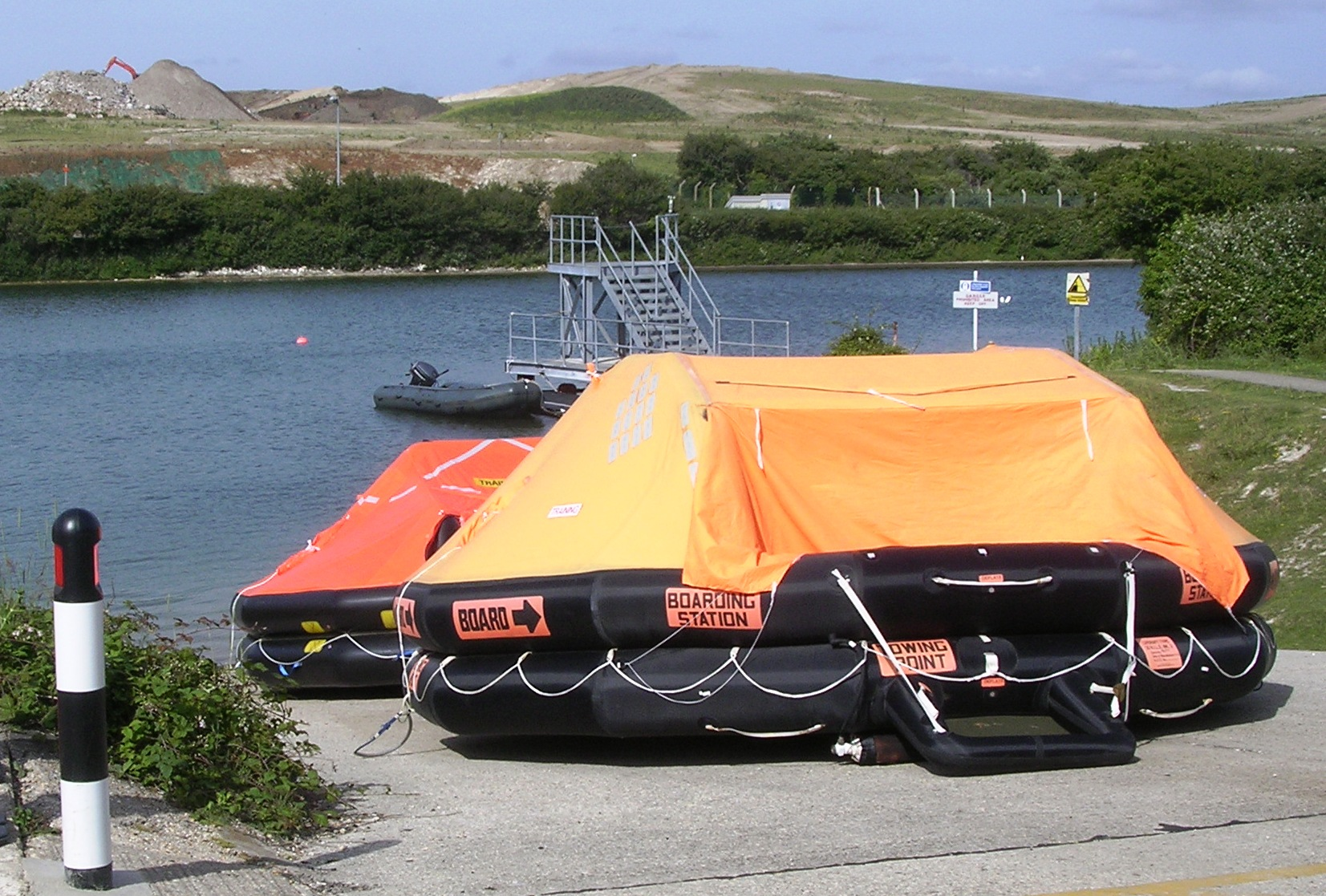
Sea Survival Centre slipway, with Paulsgrove landfill site reclamation beyond

Horsea Island was an island located off the northern shore of Portsmouth Harbour, England; gradually subsumed by reclamation, it is now connected to the mainland. Horsea falls within the city of Portsmouth and was wholly owned by the Ministry of Defence as part of the shore establishment HMS Excellent, which maintains its headquarters on Whale Island.

However, in 2013 the south-eastern corner was acquired by Portsmouth City Council for housing development. Most of the area to the south-west of the lake is part of the Portsmouth Harbour Site of Special Scientific Interest (SSSI), the remainder was declared a Site of Importance for Nature Conservation (SINC) in 2011.

== History ==
Horsea was originally two islands, Great and Little Horsea, the former large enough to support a dairy farm.

In 1804 a Royal Powder Works was established on Little Horsea in connection with the gunpowder magazine at nearby Tipner; by 1849, however, it was no longer in operation, and no above-ground evidence of the site remains to be seen.

The islands were joined to form a torpedo testing lake in 1889, using chalk excavated from Portsdown Hill, 1 km to the north, by convict labour. A narrow-gauge railway was constructed on the site by the army to distribute the chalk. Although the lake length was increased from 800 yards (730 m) to over 1,000 yards (910 m) in 1905, rapid advances in torpedo design and range had made it all but obsolete by World War I.

In 1909, the island became the site of one of the Navy's three high-power shore wireless stations, which saw it populated with dozens of tall masts. In the 1950s the lake was used in the testing of improved Martin-Baker Ejection Seats, following catapult launch mishaps on carriers in which Fleet Air Arm aircrew often sustained serious compression injuries to the spine after ejecting from submerged aircraft.

After closure of the telegraphy station in the 1960s, the northern part of the island became home to HMS Phoenix, the naval school of firefighting and damage control. The school comprised a number of steel structures called trainers, simulating three decks within a warship. Fires were set in the trainers for the purposes of instruction in various types of firefighting. The kerosene and water mix burned in the trainers, known as sullage caused significant water and air pollution and created a health hazard for the staff exposed to the fumes for protracted periods. In 1994 the school moved to a modern gas-fired trainer on Whale Island as part of a consolidation and cost effectiveness initiative. The new facility is known as the Phoenix school of Nuclear, Biological and Chemical Defence, damage control and fire fighting. Responsibility for training and site management was contracted out to Flagship Training UK, which was taken over by Vosper Thorneycroft in September 2008. Subsequently the Fire Fighting Training Unit was taken over by Babcock Marine Training Limited (BMTL) and operated until Apr 21, when it was contracted to Team Fisher Training as part of the Selborne Contract.

=== Current use ===
The original island site continues to be used by the MoD, with a number of facilities on the site predominantly focusing on diving and underwater engineering. Infrastructure includes training facilities as well as workshops, decompression chambers and equipment testing capabilities. Organisations on the site include:

- The Superintendent of Diving, a Commander, Royal Navy, who is responsible for safety and standards of diving in the Royal Navy and Royal Engineers.
- Maritime Warfare School delivers the Defence Diving School, providing new entry diving training for RN and RE divers as well as promotion courses as divers progress in their careers.
- Headquarters of the Diving and Threat Exploitation Group (formerly the Fleet Diving Squadron), which delivers diving, underwater engineering and bomb disposal capabilities in the UK and overseas using the Northern and Southern Diving Groups, and the Fleet Diving Group.
- Southern Diving Group (East)
- Fleet Diving Group
- The Sea Survival section of Phoenix.

The lake was used by Southsea British Sub Aqua Club in the 1950s, and later by many other clubs and private training agencies for underwater swimming and diving. However, civilian access is no longer permitted for security reasons.

== Reclamation ==
In the early 1970s, the eastern tidal mudflats of Paulsgrove Lake between Horsea Island and the mainland at Paulsgrove to the north were reclaimed, much of the area destined to become a landfill site, the remainder to form the Port Solent leisure complex. The landfill site closed in 2006, and waste is now incinerated at a plant in east Portsmouth. The northern part of the reclamation has been developed as 'Port Solent', a complex comprising a marina, multiplex cinema, housing, retail outlets, and some business units known collectively as the 'North Harbour Business Park'. The rest of the landfill site is being developed as a recreational park featuring woodlands and meadows.

== Geology ==
The solid geology of the site is Upper Chalk, covered by post-glacial drift deposits comprising mostly brickearth, a loess from the west of England eroded and deposited downstream by the river system which once occupied the area now known as the Solent and its margins before inundation by the sea. Much of these deposits were covered by the chalk fill imported from Ports Down to create the torpedo lake. Where still exposed, beyond the lake at the eastern end of the site, the brickearth comprises fairly equal proportions of sand, silt, and clay, with occasional flints. Owing to the high clay content, the rock is of low permeability, occasioning flooding after prolonged rainfall during winter. In the extreme south east corner of the site, brick and concrete rubble has been used to construct the bunding to enhance protection from the rising sea.

== Horsea Lake ==
The lake contains a wealth of marine life, and also holds a number of items placed for diver training, including a helicopter, vehicles, and a 200-year-old shipwreck placed in the central section. The level of the lake is maintained naturally by two submerged freshwater springs.

== Conservation ==
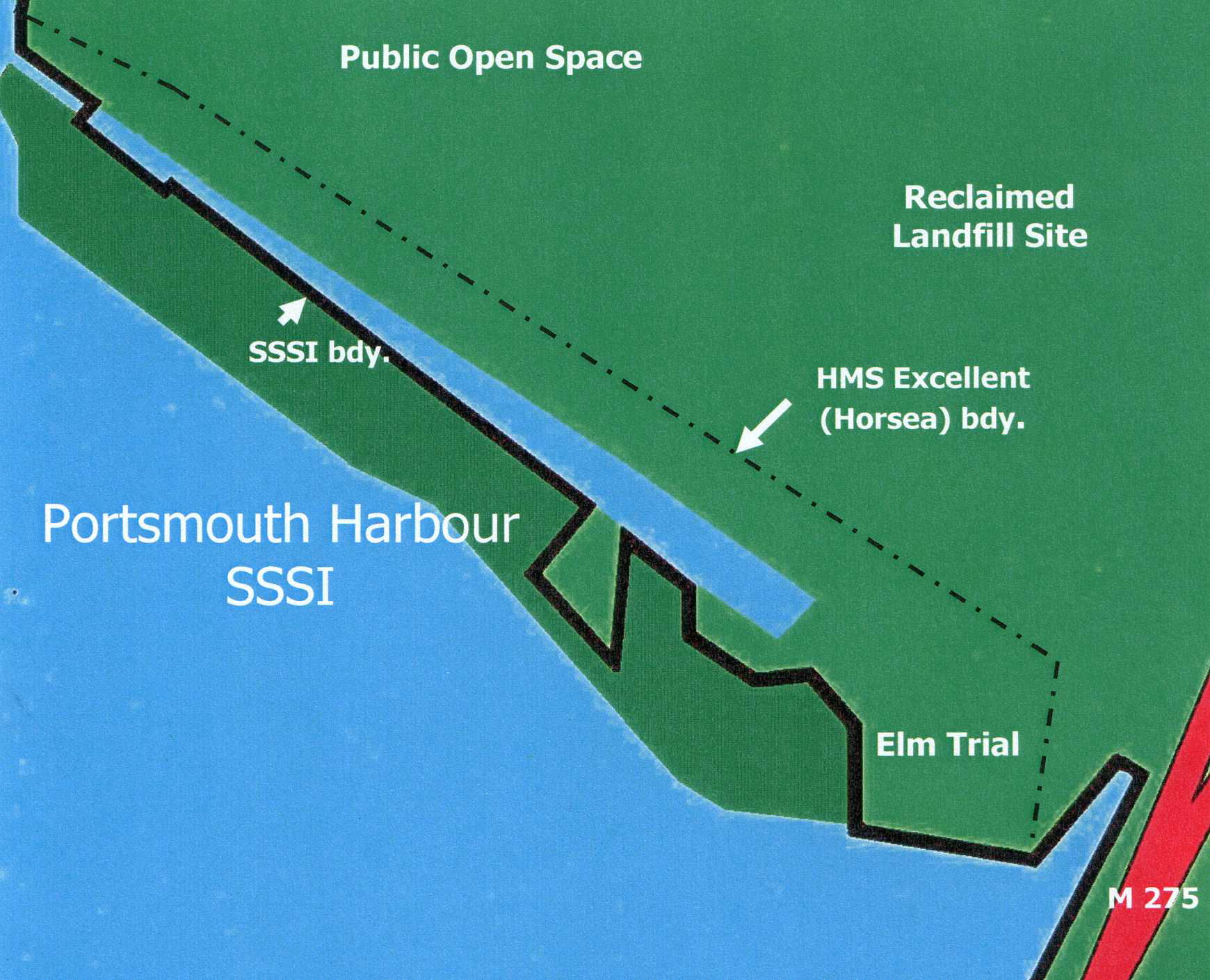
Horsea's SSSI area

=== SSSI ===
All of the undeveloped area to the southwest of the lake, with the exception of the helipad, forms one of the few terrestrial parts of the Portsmouth Harbour Site of Special Scientific Interest (SSSI) on account of its calcicole flora and fauna which have flourished on the imported chalk. Notable fauna includes the small heath butterfly Coenonympha pamphilus, designated BAP Priority Species by DEFRA on account of its increasing scarcity. Horsea is also the only known habitat in Hampshire of the micromoth Eulamprotes immaculatella.

=== SINC ===
Most of the larger remainder of the 'island' was declared a Site of Importance for Nature Conservation (SINC) by Hampshire County Council in 2011.

=== Elm trials ===
The elm thicket at the south-eastern extremity of the site, beyond the SSSI, is a habitat of the white-letter hairstreak (Satyrium w-album), and the adjacent grassland has been used since 2001 as a trials site by Butterfly Conservation for the evaluation of new disease-resistant elm cultivars and exotic species in support of its conservation. The site currently accommodates 30 trees comprising 14 cultivars and exotic species.
