= Eileen Ramsay (photographer) =

British photographer (1915–2017)

- Ramsay c. 1963
- Born: 5 December 1915; Sanderstead, Surrey
- Died: 8 February 2017 (aged 101); Droxford, Hampshire
- Known for: Yachting and powerboat photography

Eileen Ramsay (5 December 1915 – 8 February 2017) was a British photographer who made work about yachting and powerboats.

== Early life ==
Ramsay was born in Sanderstead, Surrey, and grew up in Amersham, Buckinghamshire, where she attended the nearby Chesham Grammar School. After leaving school, she went to Scandinavia to be a nanny for some friends of the family, where she first encountered sailing.

In 1937 Ramsay returned to the UK, where she got a job with the London society photographer Marcus Adams. Adams, realising that with the outbreak of World War II, he would probably be called up to act as a war photographer, handed his staff cameras and challenged them to go and take photos. Ramsay's photographs were chosen as the best ones, and she was given the responsibility of running Adams's studio during the war. At the time, Ramsay admitted to having little knowledge about cameras, but found that she was successful at taking portraits, and learnt her craft while doing her job.

After the war, Ramsay had a photograph of the Menai Strait published in the 50th edition of Photograms of the Year, which was published annually to review outstanding photography from around the world. The image, "Black Sails", was one of her first to be published. At this time, she struck up a relationship with her colleague, George Spiers who was head technician with Adams.

== Career ==
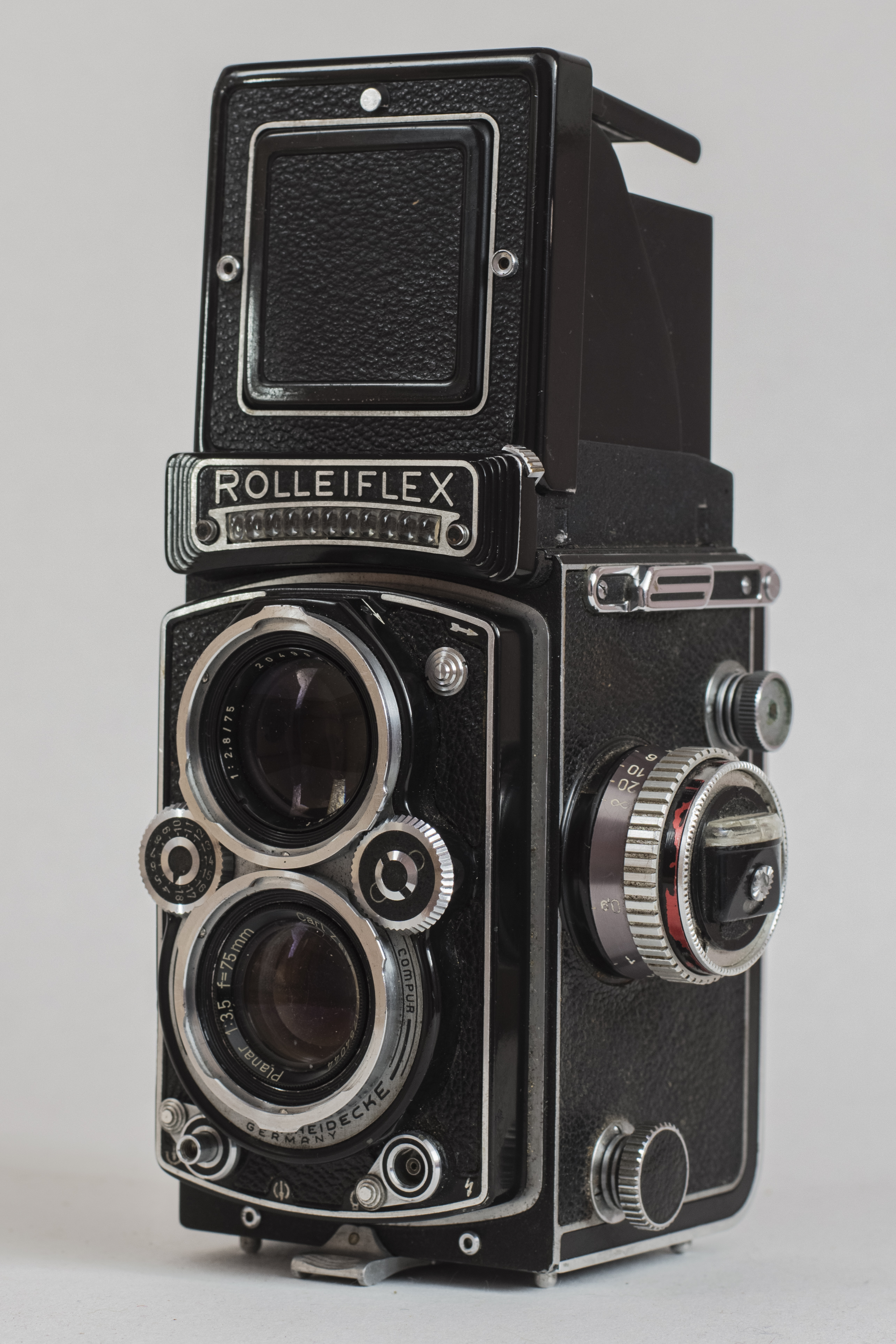
A Rolleiflex camera

Ramsay and Spiers joined forces professionally to open a studio in Chelsea, with Spiers also working as a police photographer. At this time, Ramsay noticed the photogenic possibilities of sailing boats while visiting Henley-on-Thames, and decided to focus her skills on sailing. Between 1953 and 1955, the couple moved to Hampshire to live near the River Hamble, the South Coast's centre of yachting, where Ramsay developed her signature technique of leaning dangerously out of a launch to take her photos at water level. Although expensive, due to having to replace water- and salt-damaged Rolleiflex cameras regularly, her images became instantly recognisable and unmistakably hers. As a result, she began noticing other photographers trying to copy her technique.

As a photographer, Ramsay was well-positioned to document the rapid rise in popularity of small-boat sailing after World War II. Among the sailing pioneers she worked with were Francis Chichester, Alec Rose, Blondie Hasler, and Éric Tabarly. She also photographed the Olympians Rodney Pattisson and Keith Musto, and recorded the first Observer Singlehanded Transatlantic (OSTAR) Races. For Chichester, Ramsay was the only photographer allowed upon his Gipsy Moth yachts, and she also became firm friends with his wife, Sheila. She became one of the few women to be respected and recognised by name in the male-centred yachting community, something that she suggested was maybe "because I wore the right shoes and didn't interfere." However she was also respected for her strength and firmness, successfully resisting Uffa Fox's repeated attempts to seduce her during a portrait shoot by reminding him that she was there to do a job. She also recalled having to fend off Max Aitken. Ramsay said that her independence and determination enabled her to receive commissions and roles that her male peers could only have hoped for.

Her work stood out from that of her contemporaries because she photographed boats from water level and at acute angles to create a sense of movement, rather than taking direct side-on shots. Ramsay described how one of her contemporaries, the Cowes-based photographer Keith Beken, took photographs using a plate camera while standing up on his boat, so she purposefully tried to develop a very different style, from a much lower viewpoint and taking advantage of reflections and calling herself an "impressionist" photographer. She was admired for how her images captured the surroundings around the boat such as waves and clouds to frame the main subject. Ramsay took photographs of some of the first vessels of their type, including Enterprises, Fireballs, 505s, GP14s, Mirrors, Ospreys, and Optimists. Two of the most notable yachts she photographed were Sceptre and Evaine, the first British entrants to the America's Cup, in 1958. As well as yachts and dinghies, she was also an active powerboat photographer, especially the ones built on the Hamble river. She photographed some of the first offshore powerboat racing races such as the Cowes Torquay Cowes in 1961 and the 1969 Round Britain races. Each August, she recorded Cowes Week. Her photographs were sold both to the press, and to her competitors.

== Later life, death, and legacy ==
In 1971, following the death of George Spiers in a riding accident, Ramsay gave up photography. She moved further inland to Droxford, a village in Hampshire, and focused on gardening, and painting flowers and wild birds. She died on 8 February 2017 at the age of 101.

In her late nineties, Ramsay asked PPL Media to handle her archive, and they now hold it alongside the official archives of Sir Francis Chichester, Robin Knox-Johnston and Chay Blyth, and other sailing-related material dating back to the mid-19th century. At the time of the gift, it was noted that few other women, with the possible exception of Kos Evans, had achieved anywhere near the same success and name-recognition as a yachting photographer as Ramsay had.
