= HMNB Portsmouth =

Operating base in the United Kingdom for the Royal Navy

HMNB Portsmouth
- Portsmouth, Hampshire, England
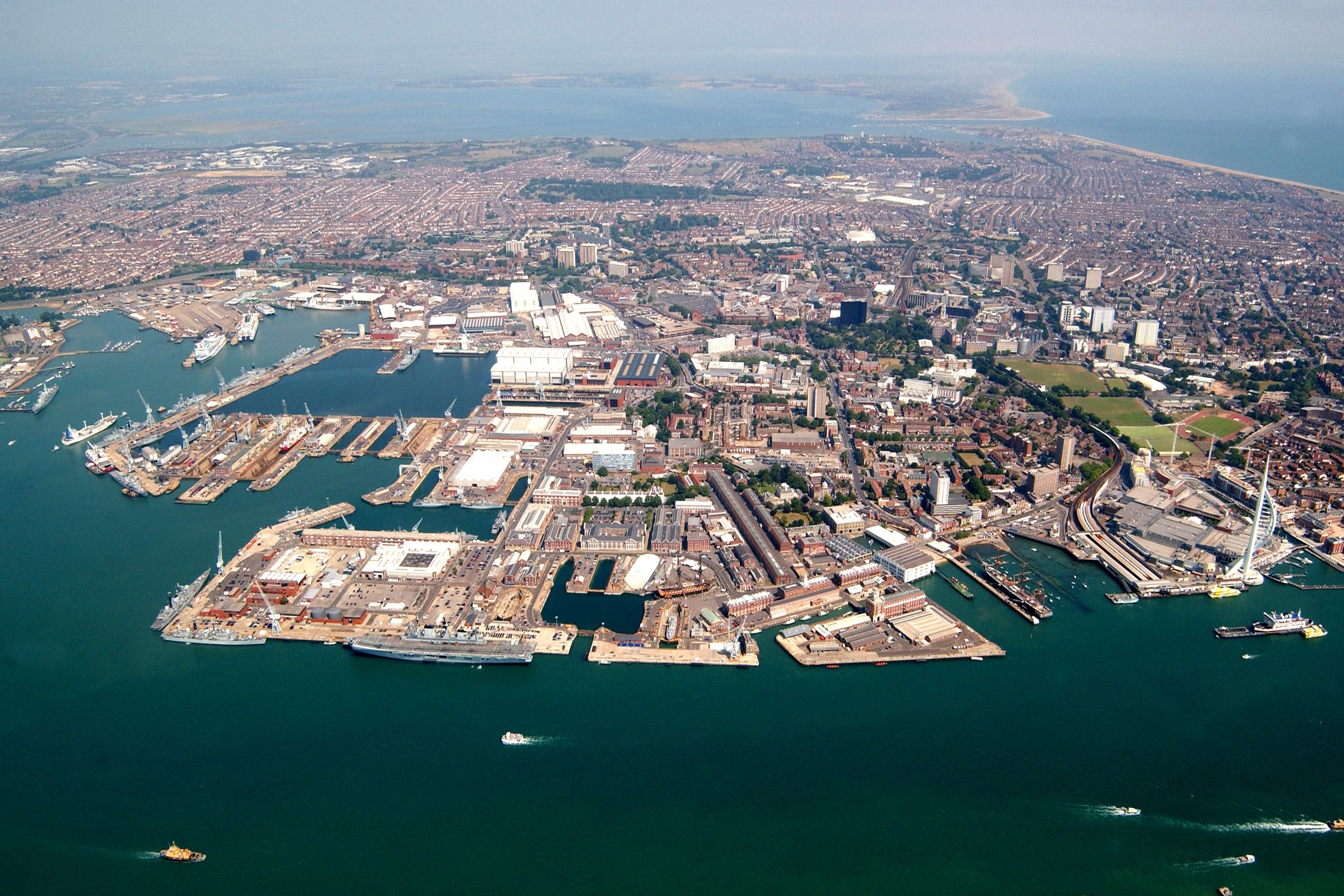
- An aerial view of HMNB Portsmouth taken in 2005

Site information
- Type: Naval base
- Owner: Ministry of Defence (Defence Equipment and Support)
- Operator: Royal Navy
- Controlled by: Naval Base Commander, Portsmouth
- Condition: Operational
- Website: www.royalnavy.mod.uk/our-organisation/bases-and-stations/naval-base/portsmouth

Location
- Location in Hampshire
- Coordinates: 50°48′15″N 1°06′09″W
- Area: 122 hectares (300 acres)

Site history
- Built: 1194
- In use: 1194–present
- Events: International Festivals of the Sea (1998, 2001 & 2005)

Garrison information
- Current commander: Commodore John Voyce OBE
- Garrison: Portsmouth Flotilla

His Majesty's Naval Base, Portsmouth (HMNB Portsmouth) is one of three operating bases in the United Kingdom for the Royal Navy (the others being HMNB Clyde and HMNB Devonport). Portsmouth Naval Base is part of the city of Portsmouth; it is located on the eastern shore of Portsmouth Harbour, north of the Solent and the Isle of Wight. For centuries it was officially known as HM Dockyard, Portsmouth: as a Royal Navy Dockyard, Portsmouth functioned primarily as a state-owned facility for building, repairing and maintaining warships; for a time it was the largest industrial site in the world.

From the 1970s, the term 'Naval Base' began to be used for Portsmouth (and other Royal Dockyards), acknowledging a greater focus on personnel and support elements alongside the traditional industrial emphases. In 1984 Portsmouth's Royal Dockyard function was significantly downsized and downgraded, and was formally renamed the 'Fleet Maintenance and Repair Organisation' (FMRO). The FMRO was privatised in 1998; in 2002, shipbuilding (which had not taken place on site since the late 1960s) resumed in the form of block construction, but this again ceased in 2014.

Today, Portsmouth is the home base for two-thirds of the Royal Navy surface fleet, including the two aircraft carriers, HMS Queen Elizabeth and HMS Prince of Wales. Naval logistics, accommodation and messing are provided on site, with personnel support functions (e.g. medical and dental; education; pastoral and welfare) provided by Defence Equipment and Support. Other functions and departments, e.g. Navy Command Headquarters support staff, are also accommodated within the Naval Base. The base is additionally home to a number of commercial shore activities, including the ship repair and maintenance facility operated by BAE Systems Maritime Services.

The base is the oldest in the Royal Navy, and it has been an important part of the Senior Service's history and the defence of the British Isles for centuries. It is home to one of the oldest surviving drydocks in the world. The former Block Mills are of international significance, having been the first factory in the world to employ steam-powered machine tools for mass production. The Royal Naval Museum has been on the site since 1911. In 1985 a partnership between the Ministry of Defence and Portsmouth City Council created the Portsmouth Naval Base Property Trust to manage part of the historic south-west corner of the Naval Base, under a 99-year lease, as an heritage area, the Portsmouth Historic Dockyard. It allows members of the public to visit important maritime attractions such as Mary Rose, HMS Victory, HMS Warrior and the National Museum of the Royal Navy.

== Functioning base ==
=== Senior personnel ===
The Naval Base Commander (NBC) since September 2024 is Commodore Marcel Rosenberg. The harbour is under the control of the King's Harbour Master (KHM), who is the regulatory authority of the Dockyard Port of Portsmouth, an area of approximately 50 square miles (130 km^{2}) that encompasses Portsmouth Harbour and the Eastern Solent. KHM Harbour Control is based in the Semaphore Tower building. Shipping movements are handled by a team of admiralty pilots headed by the Chief Admiralty Pilot.

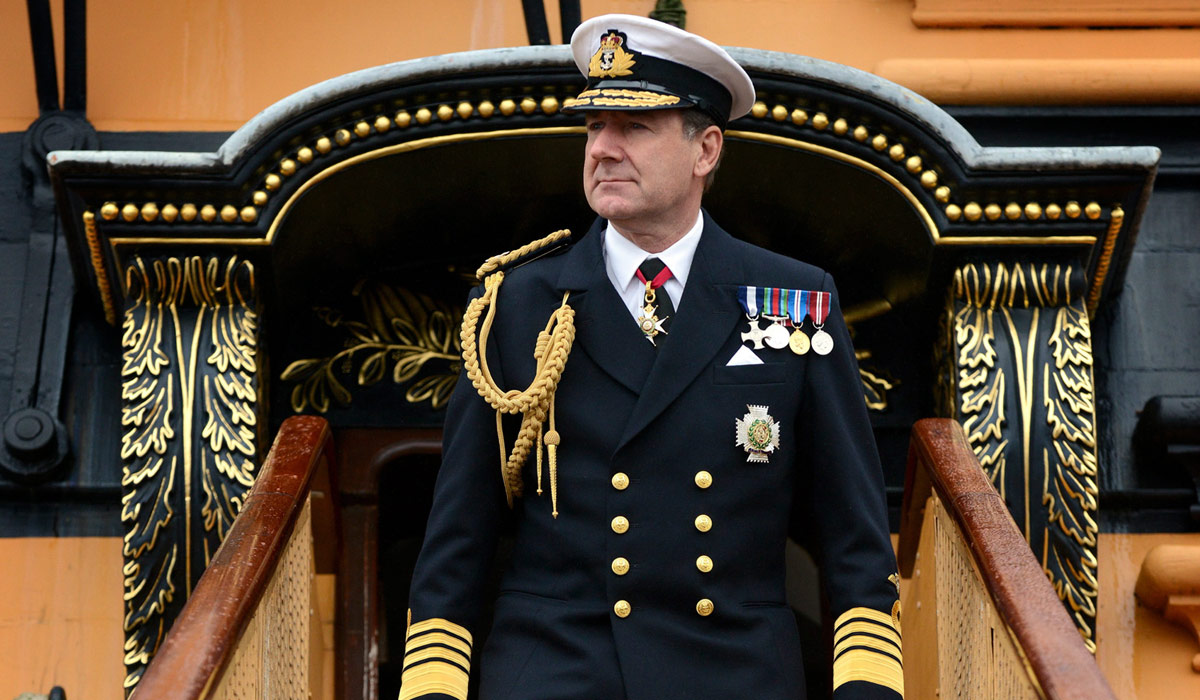
The then First Sea Lord, Sir George Zambellas, disembarking from HMS Victory in 2014.

In 1836 the Commander-in-Chief, Portsmouth was given accommodation within the Dockyard (in Admiralty House) and in 1889 he was given HMS Victory to be his ceremonial flagship. These privileges were inherited by the Commander-in-Chief Naval Home Command (whose post was combined with that of Second Sea Lord in 1994), who continued to fly his flag from HMS Victory until 2012. That year the post of Commander-in-Chief reverted to the First Sea Lord, and with it the use of Victory as flagship. The Second Sea Lord is now based at the Henry Leach Building on Whale Island, which is also the headquarters of the Fleet Commander.

=== List of based ships ===
Some of the following ships (e.g. the patrol vessels) are not based in Portsmouth, but form part of the Portsmouth Flotilla.

==== First-rate ship of the line ====
- HMS Victory

==== Queen Elizabeth-class aircraft carriers ====
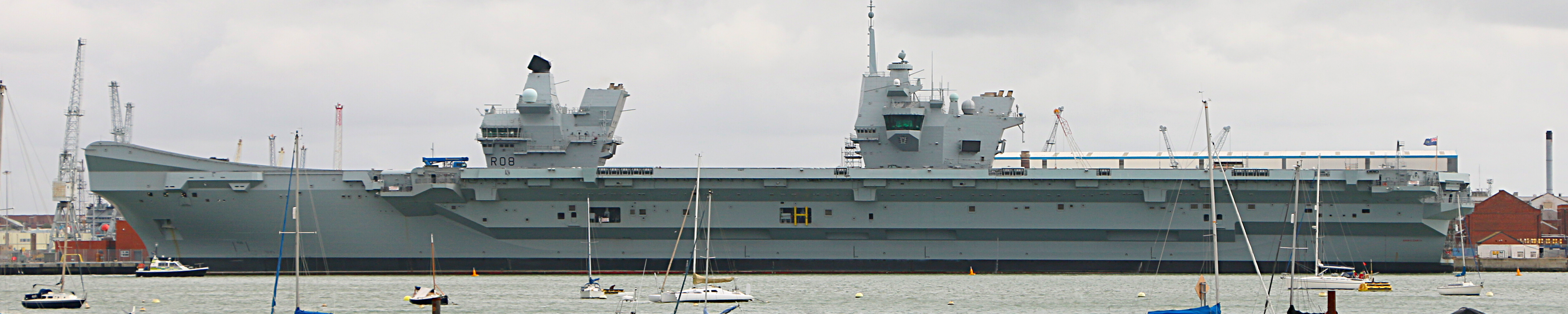
HMS Queen Elizabeth berthed alongside Princess Royal Jetty (formerly Middle Slip Jetty)

- HMS Queen Elizabeth
- HMS Prince of Wales

==== Type 45 destroyers ====
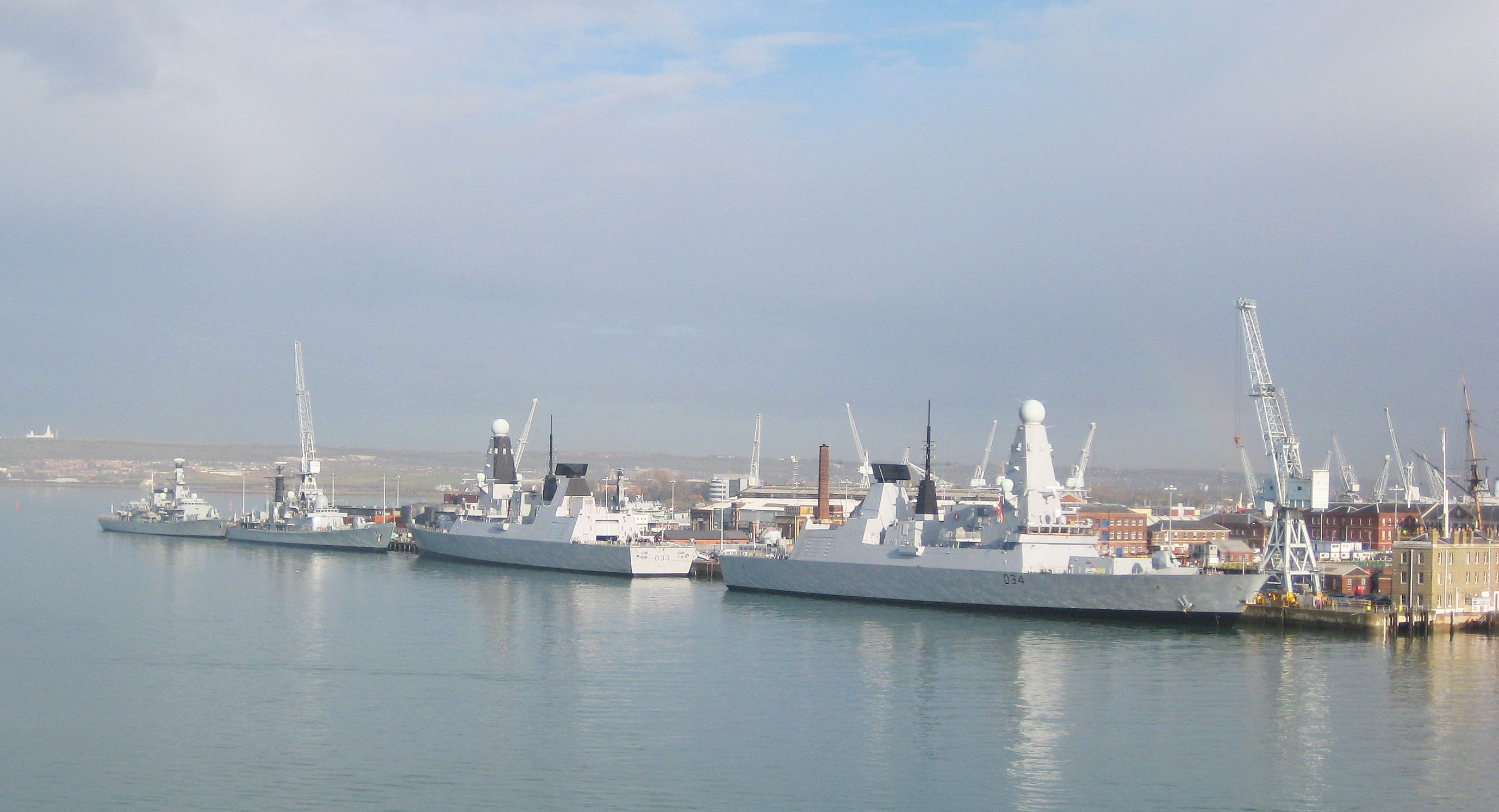
Type 45 destroyers HMS Dauntless and HMS Diamond.

- HMS Daring – completing refit; inactive for nearly 8 years as of late 2025
- HMS Dauntless
- HMS Diamond
- HMS Dragon
- HMS Defender – entered refit in 2023, scheduled for major upgrade work until 2026
- HMS Duncan

==== Hunt-class mine countermeasures vessels ====
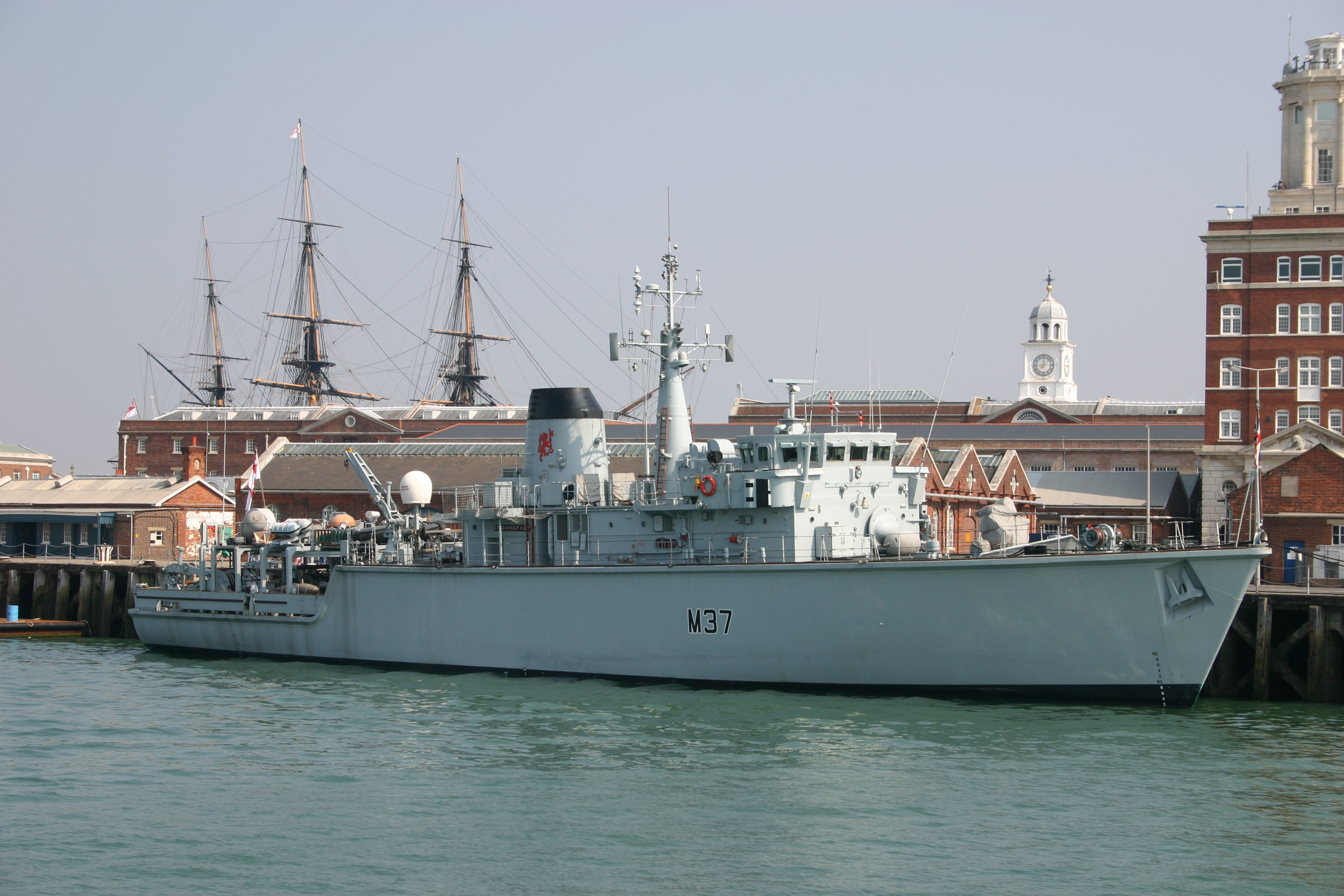
Former MCMV HMS Chiddingfold on the South Railway Jetty

- HMS Ledbury
- HMS Cattistock
- HMS Brocklesby
- HMS Middleton
- HMS Hurworth

Mine countermeasures mothership for autonomous systems

- HMS Stirling Castle (former Royal Fleet Auxiliary vessel based in Portsmouth from mid-2025 as "mothership" of autonomous vessels from Mine Threat and Exploitation Group)

==== River-class patrol vessels ====
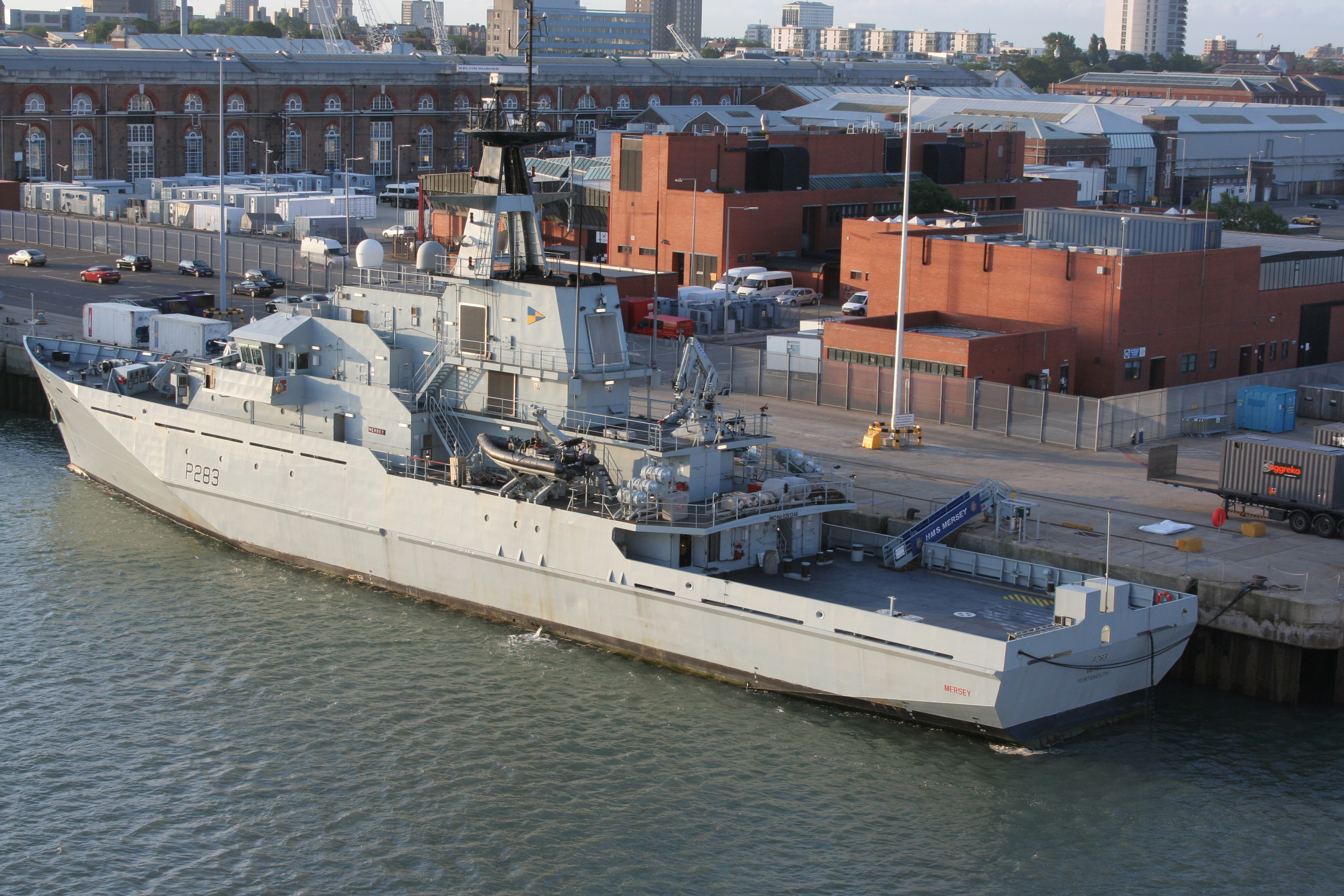
Patrol vessel HMS Mersey at HMNB Portsmouth

- HMS Tyne – Fishery protection vessel
- HMS Severn – Fishery protection vessel
- HMS Mersey – Fishery protection vessel
- HMS Forth
- HMS Medway – forward deployed to the Falkland Islands as of early 2026
- HMS Trent
- HMS Tamar – forward deployed to the Indo-Pacific region since 2021, with primary logistics hub at the British Defence Singapore Support Unit in Singapore
- HMS Spey – forward deployed to the Indo-Pacific region since 2021, with primary logistics hub at the British Defence Singapore Support Unit in Singapore

==== Cutlass-class patrol vessels ====
- HMS Cutlass – permanently assigned to the Gibraltar Squadron
- HMS Dagger – permanently assigned to the Gibraltar Squadron

==== Archer-class patrol vessels ====
- HMS Blazer – Southampton Universities Royal Naval Unit
- HMS Exploit – Birmingham Universities Royal Naval Unit
- HMS Puncher – London Universities Royal Naval Unit
- HMS Ranger – Sussex Universities Royal Naval Unit
- HMS Smiter – Oxford Universities Royal Naval Unit

==== Experimental vessel ====
- XV Patrick Blackett (since 2022) – experimental vessel in RN service

==== Defence Dive School/Fleet Diving Unit Portsmouth ====
- 3× Sea-class 15 m diving support boats

== Portsmouth Historic Dockyard ==
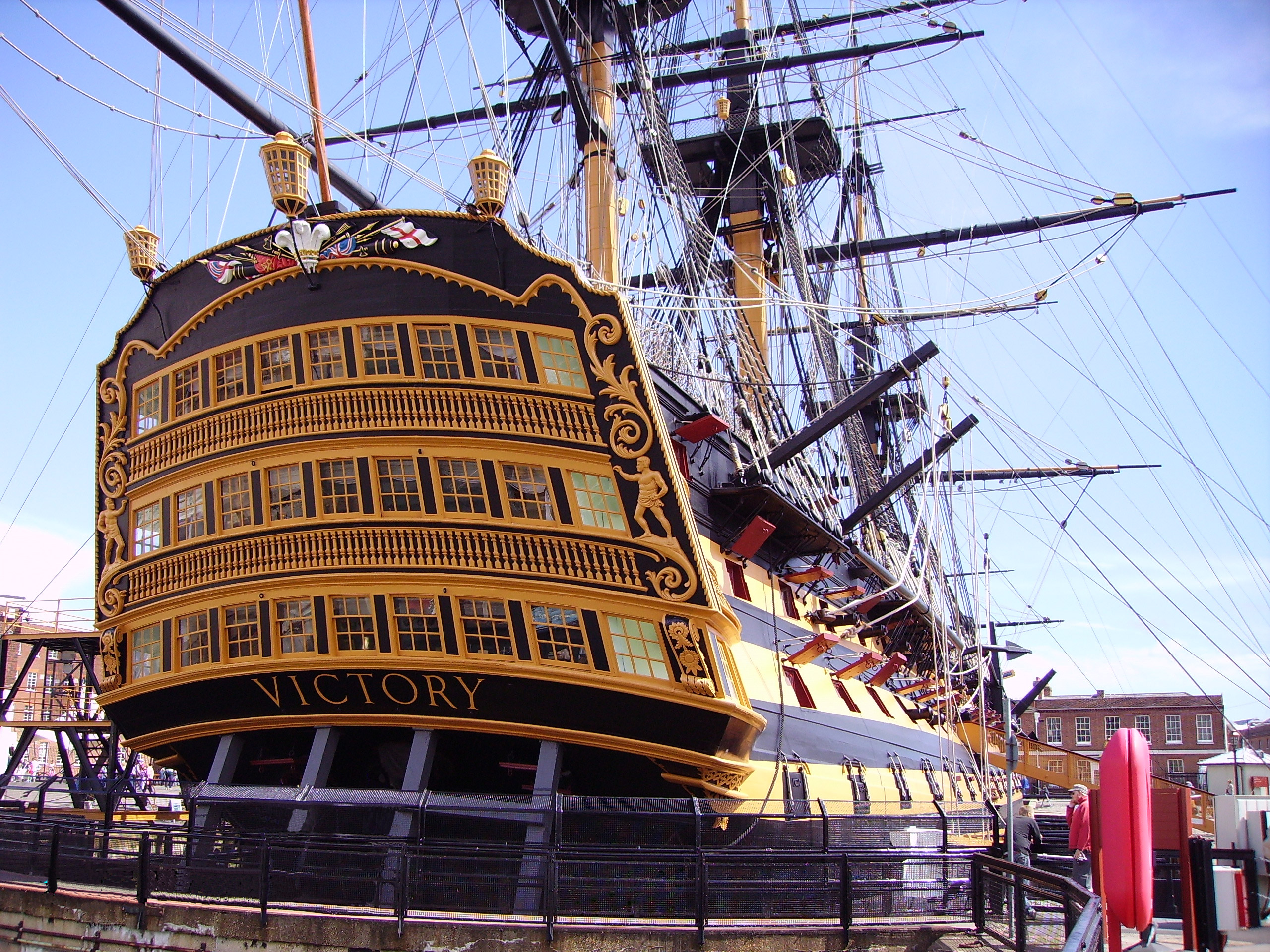
HMS Victory

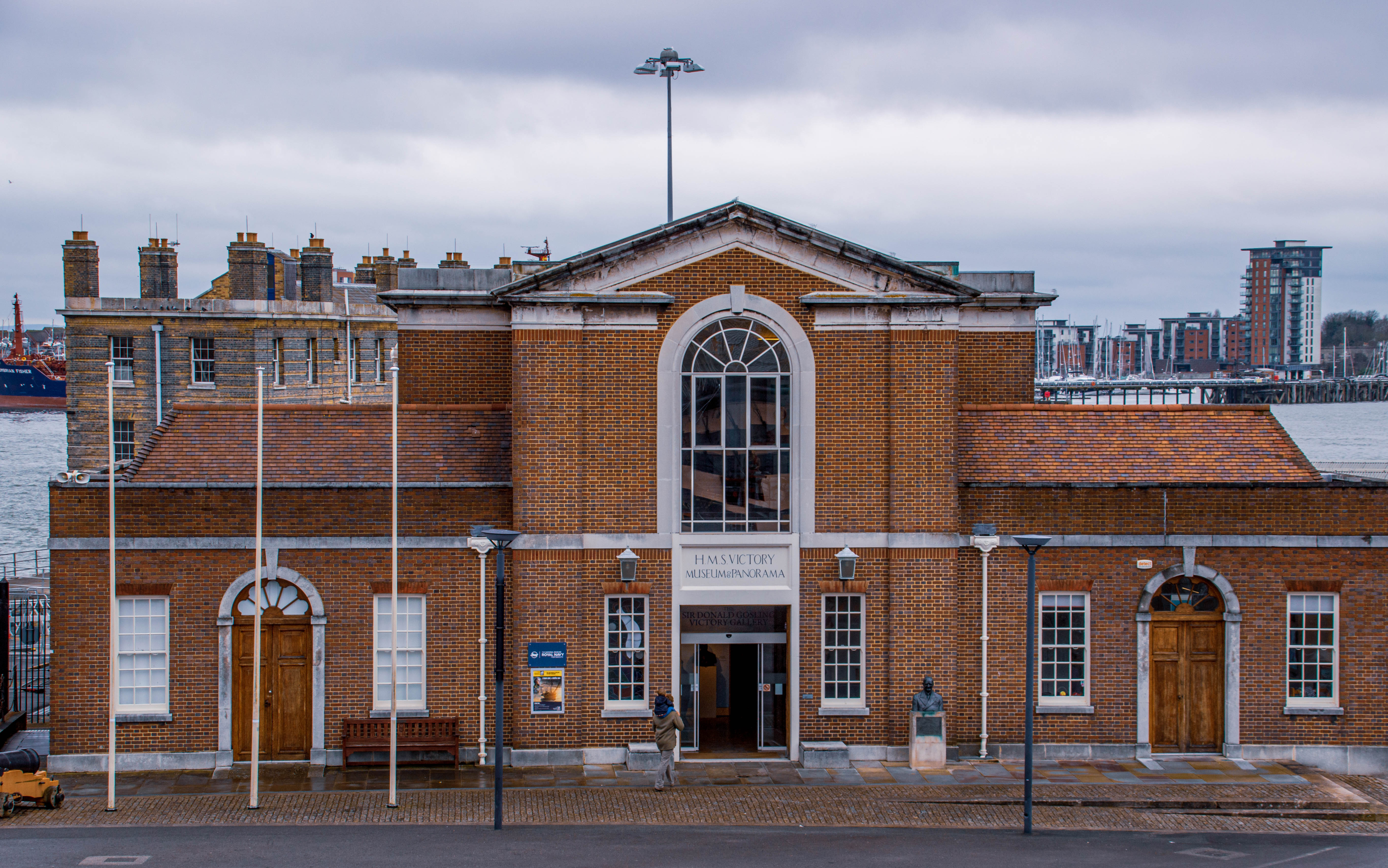
Victory Gallery (the dockyard's first purpose-built museum) opened in 1938.

Portsmouth Historic Dockyard is the name given to the portion of the base which is open to the public; it plays host to:

- The Mary Rose Museum, containing the raised wreck of the Tudor carrack Mary Rose.
- HMS Victory, Nelson's flagship at Trafalgar, which (whilst still being in commission) is also open to the public.
- HMS Warrior (1860), the first ocean-going Ironclad (built at Blackwall on the River Thames in 1860 and now moored alongside the dockyard).
- HMS M33, a World War I monitor.
- The National Museum of the Royal Navy, Portsmouth, one of the world's leading maritime museums: galleries include the Nelson Gallery, the Sailing Navy Gallery and the Hear My Story Gallery; exhibits include the Trafalgar Sail (the foretop sail of Victory used at the Battle of Trafalgar, 1805).
- The Victory Gallery, telling 'the untold stories behind HMS Victory'; it also contains the museum's Figurehead Collection and W. L. Wyllie's panorama painting of the Battle of Trafalgar.
- The Dockyard Apprentice exhibition in Boathouse 7 (presented by the Portsmouth Royal Dockyard Historical Trust) which tells the story of the Dockyard itself and working life within it.
- Portsmouth Harbour Tours, providing boat tours and indicating current naval vessels moored around the harbour.
- Boathouse 4, which tells the 'forgotten story' of the small boats of the Navy and is an active boat building and restoration site.

=== Portsmouth Historic Quarter Trust ===
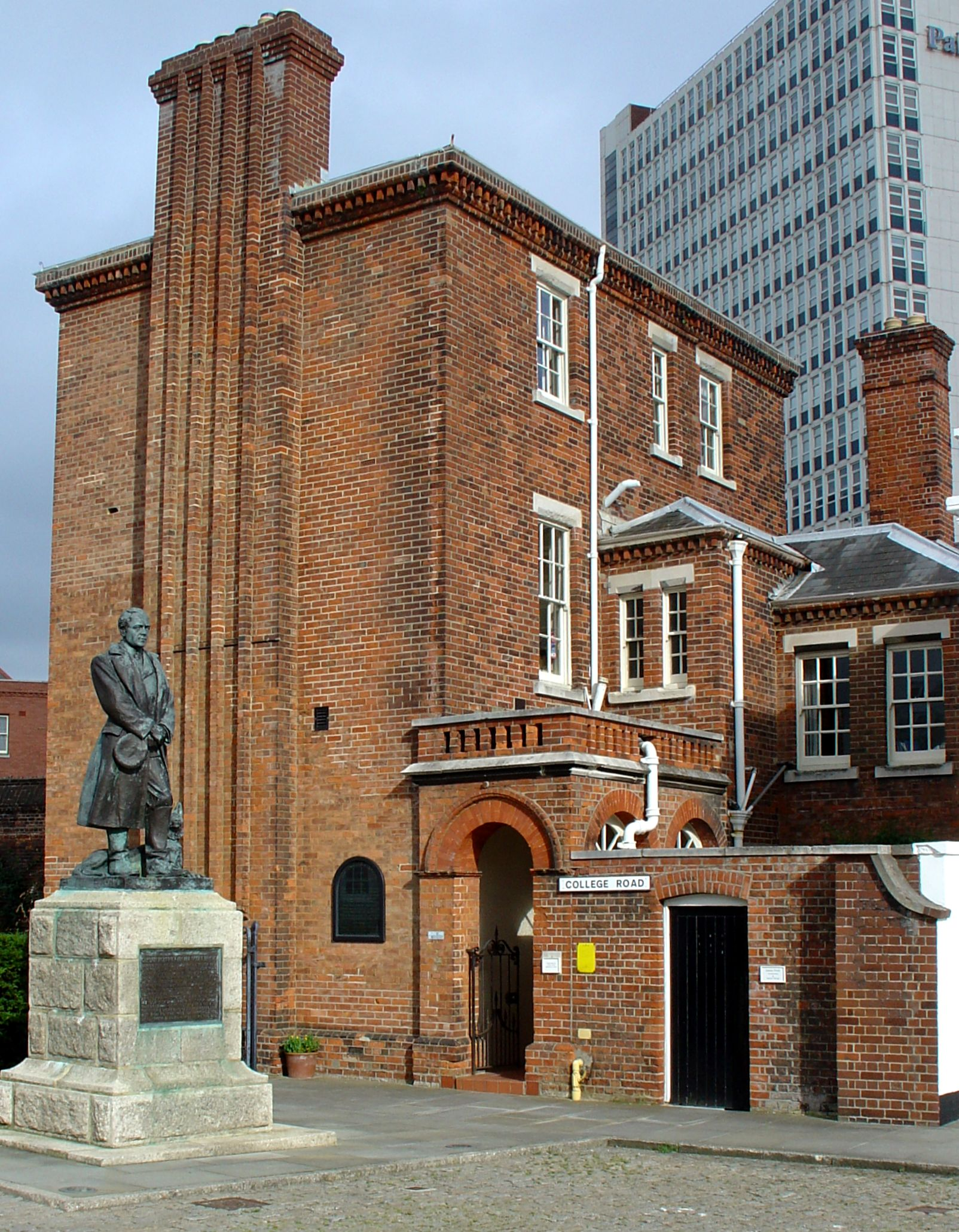
The PHQ Trust head office within the Dockyard.

The Portsmouth Naval Base Property Trust was established in 1985 (by the Ministry of Defence, English Heritage and Portsmouth City Council); it was granted a 99-year lease on the 12-acre site now known as Portsmouth Historic Dockyard, and this area was then fenced off from the working part of the dockyard. In 2009 it acquired in addition the leasehold of Priddy's Hard (a former RN Armament Depot on the other side of the harbour). In 2024 the charity was renamed Portsmouth Historic Quarter Trust; its main offices are in the former Police Superintendent's house, next to the Porters' Lodge.

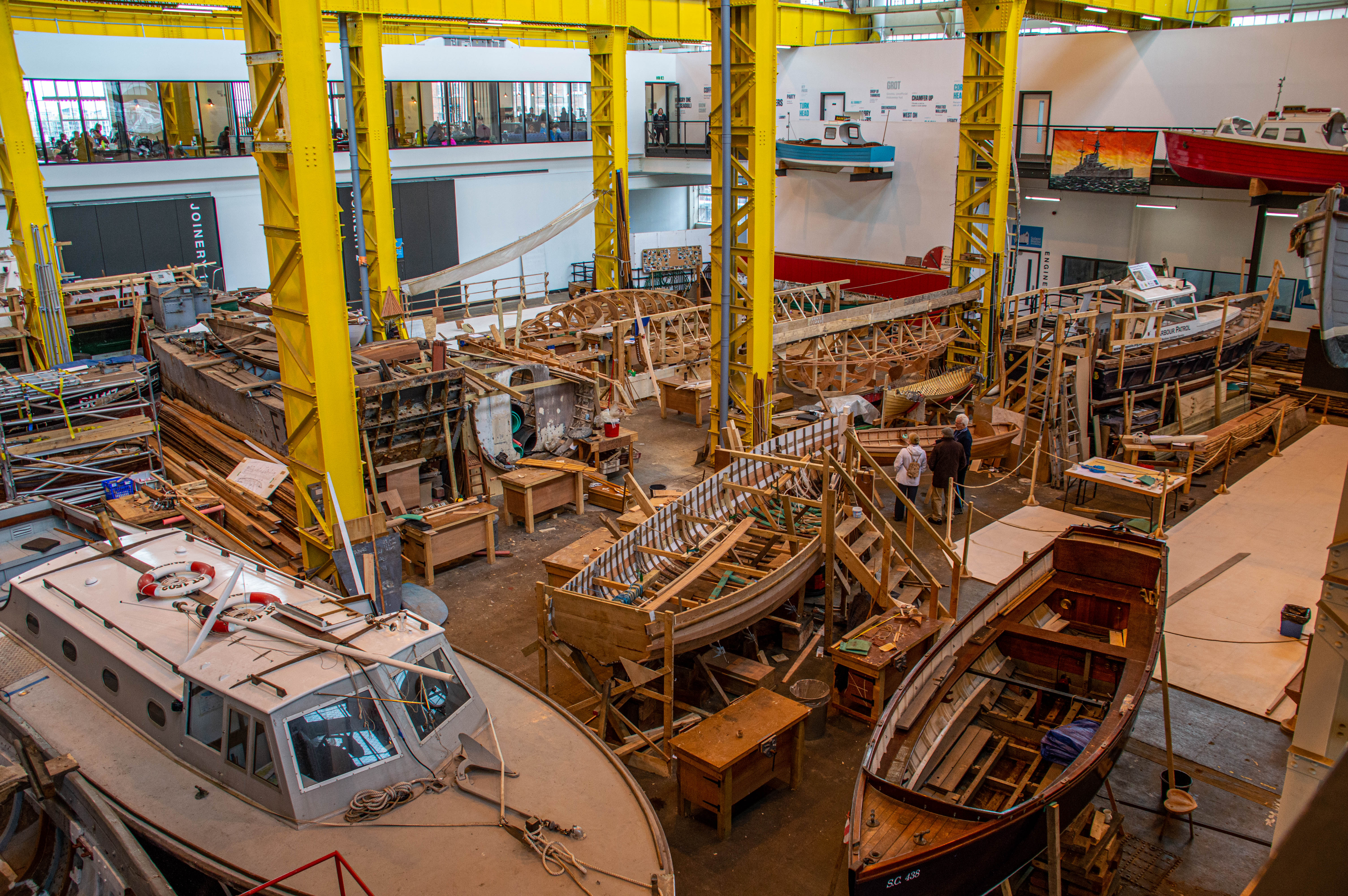
Boatbuilding work in Boathouse 4

The Trust functions as the custodian of 'historic buildings, boats and spaces in and around Portsmouth Harbour', aiming to preserve and develop the 'rich maritime heritage and vibrant culture' of its sites, through 'building regeneration, boat restoration, volunteer activity and community collaboration'. It manages the areas of the Historic Dockyard that can be accessed free of charge, including Boathouse 4, Boathouse 7 and various outdoor spaces.

The trust has long sought to extend the area of the Historic Dockyard to cover Dry Docks 4 and 5 and the historic Block Mills building (among others). In 2015 an architectural design competition for the project was won by Latz and Partner; however, the Ministry of Defence subsequently indicated that property to the north of the Mary Rose will not now be ceded for several years at least, due to the site's proximity to the berth of the new Queen Elizabeth-class aircraft carriers.

== History ==
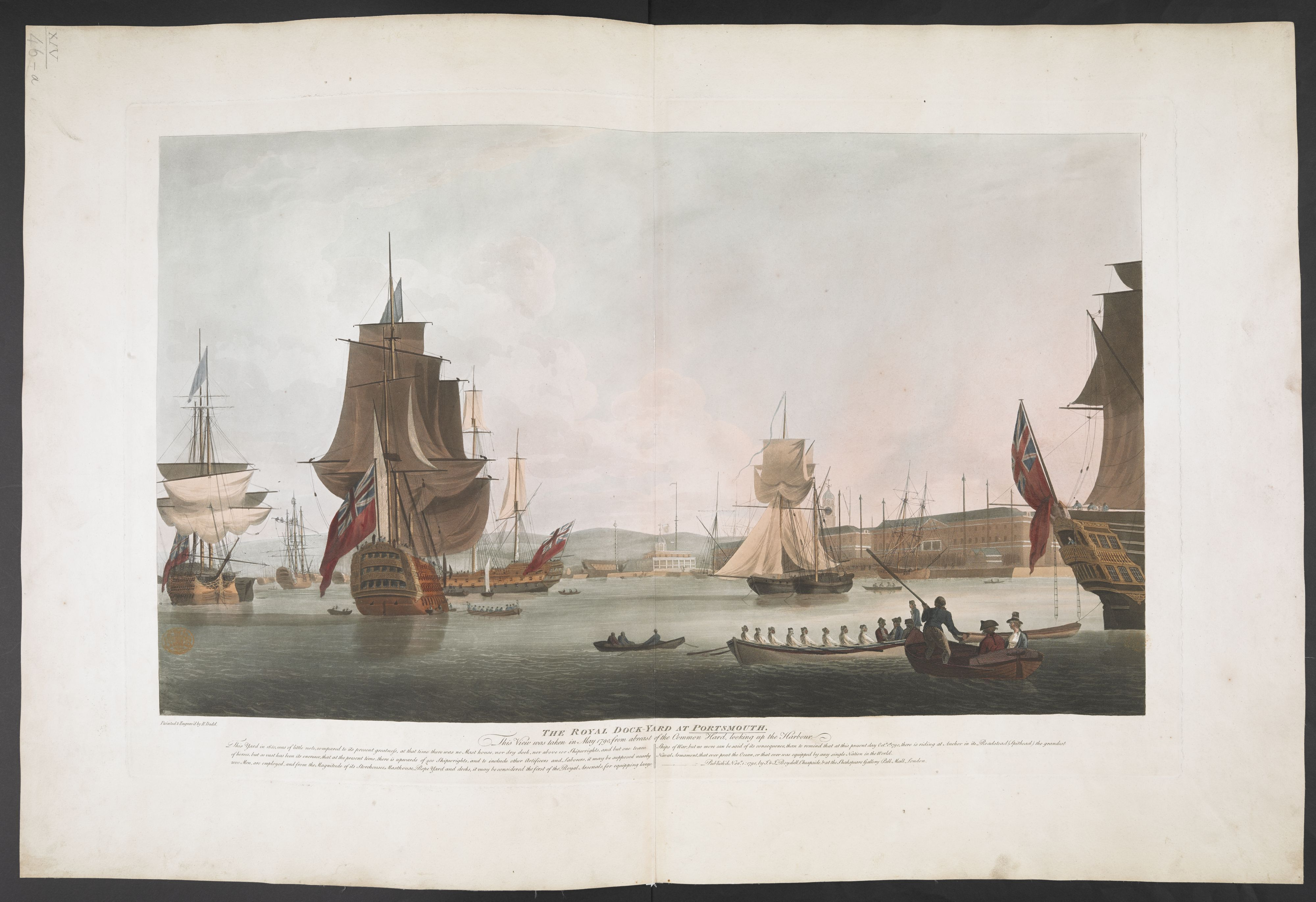
'The Royal Dock-Yard at Portsmouth', as depicted by Robert Dodd in May 1790.

Along with Woolwich, Deptford, Chatham and Plymouth, Portsmouth has been one of the main Royal Navy Dockyards or Bases throughout its history.

=== Medieval period ===
Richard I ordered construction of the first dock on the site in 1194, while his successor John added walls around the area in 1212. The docks were used by various kings when embarking on invasions of France through the 13th and 14th centuries, including the Saintonge War in 1242. Edward II ordered all ports on the south coast to assemble their largest vessels at Portsmouth to carry soldiers and horses to the Duchy of Aquitaine in 1324 to strengthen defences.

=== Tudors ===
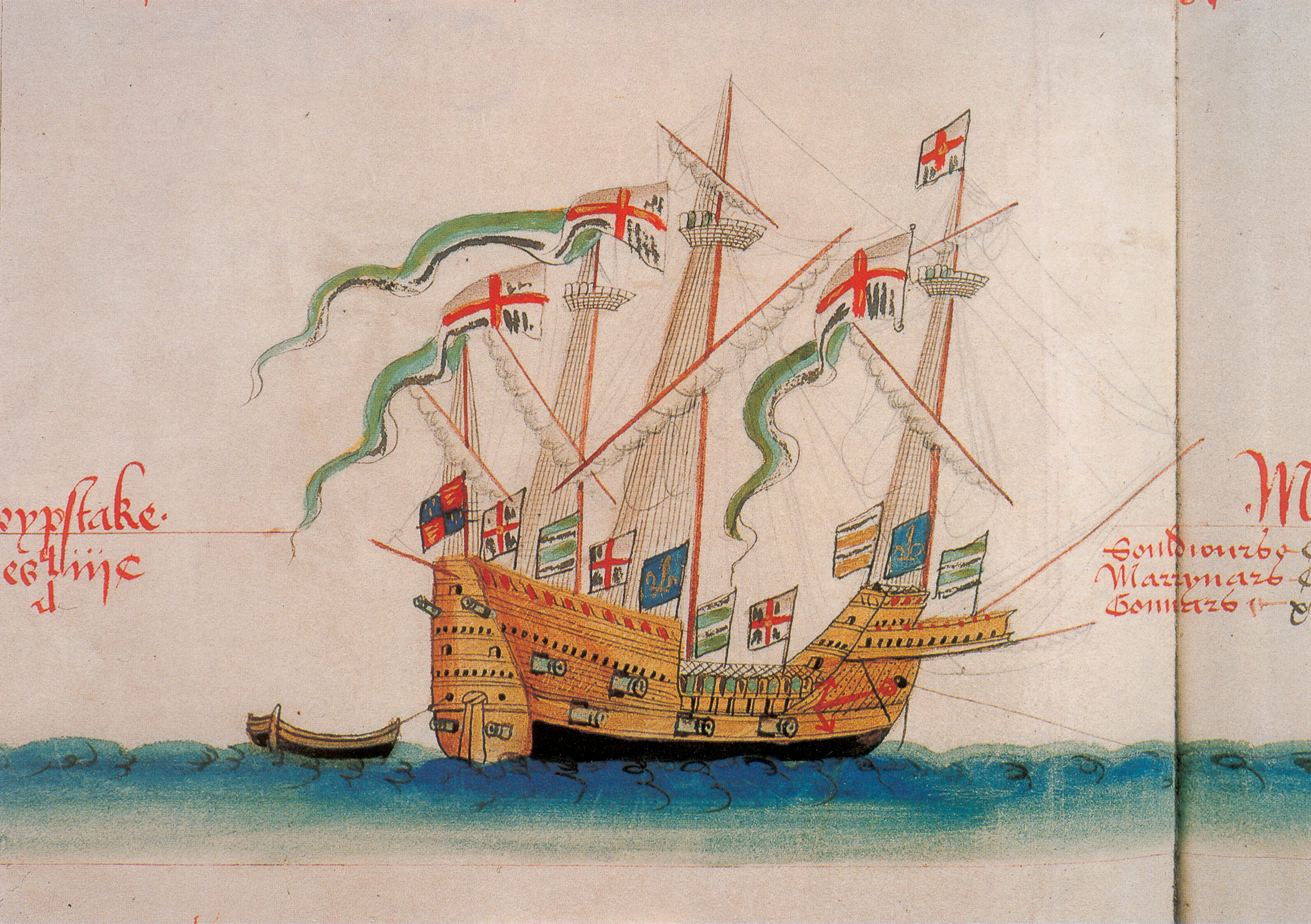
Sweepstake as pictured in the Anthony Roll.

The first recorded dry dock in the world was built in Portsmouth by Henry VII in 1495. The first warship built here was the Sweepstake of 1497; of more significance were the carracks Mary Rose of 1509 and Peter Pomegranate of 1510—both were rebuilt here in 1536. The wreck of the Mary Rose (which capsized in 1545, but was raised in 1982) is on display in a purpose-built museum. A fourth Tudor warship was the galleass Jennett, built in 1539 and enlarged as a galleon in 1559.

The appointment of one Thomas Jermyn as Keeper of the Dock at Portsmouth is recorded in 1526, with a Clerk of the Stores being appointed from 1542. Contemporary records suggest that the dry dock was enlarged and rebuilt in 1523 in order to accommodate the Henry Grace à Dieu (the largest ship of the fleet at that time); but a hundred years later it is described as being filled with rubble.

Following the establishment of Chatham Dockyard in the mid-1500s, no new naval vessels were built here until 1648, but ships from Portsmouth were a key part of the fleet that drove off the Spanish Armada in 1588.

=== Seventeenth century ===
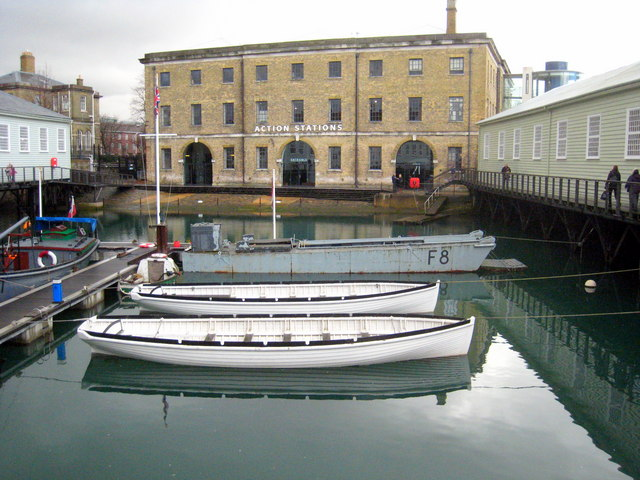
The Mast Pond (later used as a Boat Pond) dates from 1665; timber for masts and spars was stored in ponds to prevent drying and splitting

Naval shipbuilding at Portsmouth recommenced under the English Commonwealth, the first ship being the eponymous fourth-rate frigate Portsmouth launched in 1650. (Portsmouth had been a parliamentarian town during the civil war.) A resident Commissioner was first appointed in 1649; fifteen years later the Commissioner was provided with a house, and extensive gardens, at the centre of the yard. A new double dry dock (i.e. double the standard length so as to accommodate two ships at once) was built by the Commonwealth government in 1656, on what was then the tip of land at the north-west corner of the yard. It was joined by a single dry dock, just to the south; the yard's one shipbuilding slip (completed in 1651) stood between the two docks. These would all have been built of timber, rather than stone.

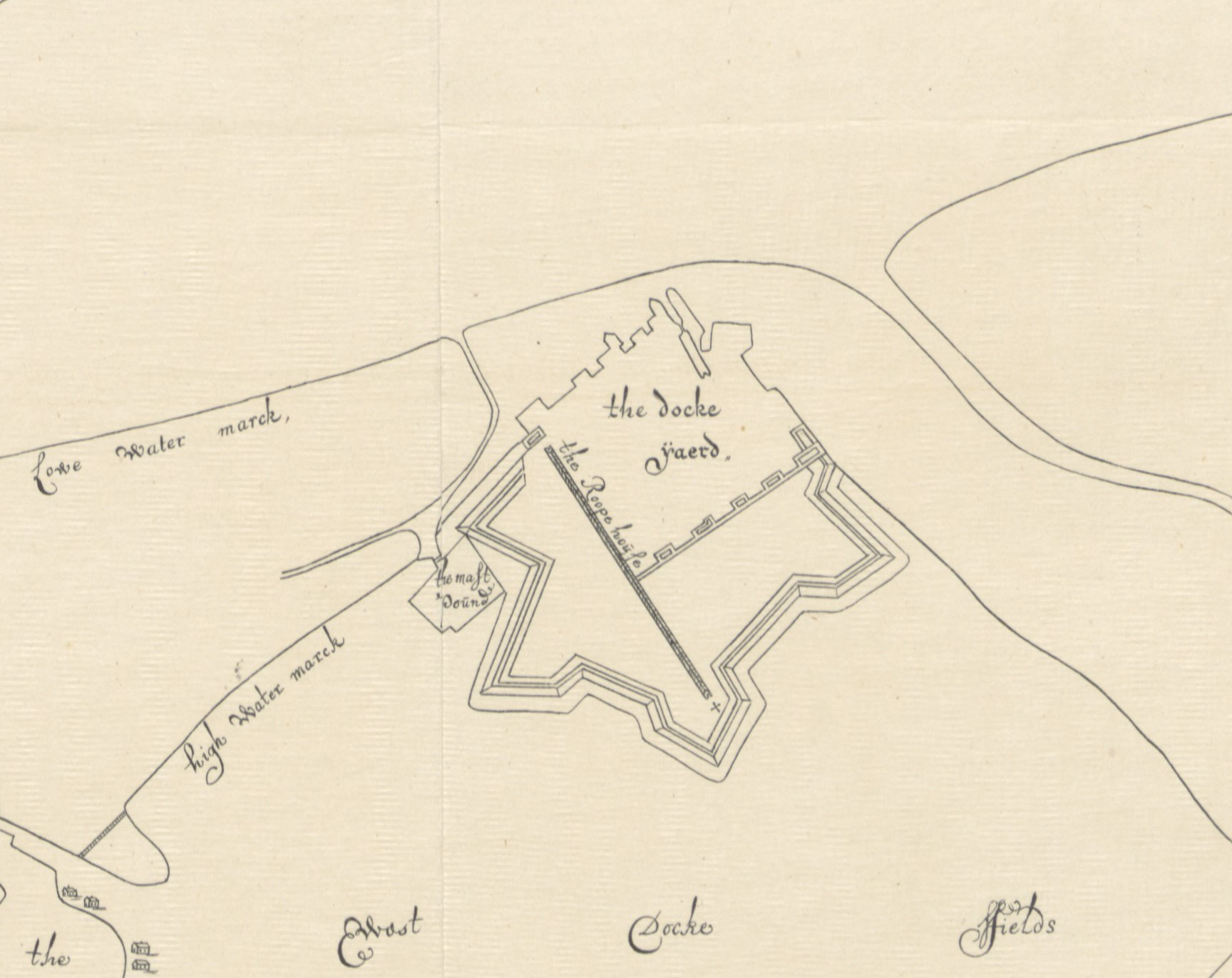
The newly-fortified 'docke yaerd' in 1668 (from a copy of a map by Sir Bernard de Gomme). The 'mast pound' and 'roope house' are shown.

By 1660 the dockyard had, in addition to these large-scale facilities for shipbuilding and repairs, a new rope house (1,095 ft (334 m) in length) and a variety of small storehouses, workshops and dwellings arranged around the site, which was now enclosed by a wooden palisade. After the Restoration, there was continued investment in the site with the excavation of a new mast pond, begun in 1664, alongside which a mast house was built in 1669. Between 1665 and 1668 Bernard de Gomme fortified the dockyard with an earthen rampart (complete with one bastion and two demi-bastions), as part of his wider fortification of Portsmouth and Gosport.

==== Dummer's pioneering engineering works ====
As France began to pose more of a military threat to England, the strategic importance of Portsmouth grew. In 1689, Parliament ordered a new dry dock to be built there, large enough to accommodate the latest first-rate and second-rate ships of the line (which were too big for the existing docks). Work began in 1691; as with all subsequent extensions to the dockyard, the new works were built on reclaimed land (on what had been mud flats, to north of the old double dock) and the civil engineering involved was on an unprecedented scale.

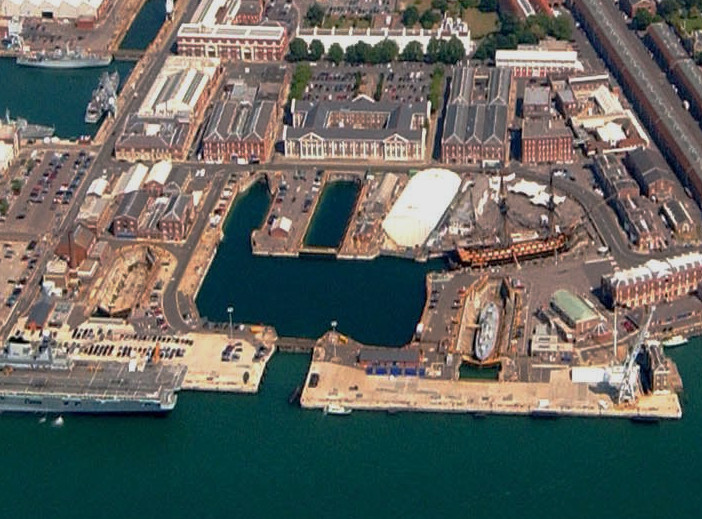
No 1 Basin, originally built by Edmund Dummer in 1698.

The work was entrusted to Edmund Dummer, naval engineer and surveyor to the Navy Board. His new dry dock (the "Great Stone Dock" as it was called) was built to a pioneering new design, using brick and stone rather than wood and with an increased number of 'altars' or steps (the stepped sides allowed shorter timbers to be used for shoring and made it much easier for shipwrights to reach the underside of vessels needing repair). Extensively rebuilt in 1769, the Great Stone Dock is now known as No.5 dock.

Along with the new dock, Dummer proposed that two wet docks (non-tidal basins) be built: the first ("Lower") Wet Dock was entered directly from the harbour and provided access to the Great Stone Dock; since much expanded, it remains in place (now known as "No. 1 Basin"). The second ("Upper") Wet Dock was entered by way of a channel. To empty the dry dock, Dummer designed a unique system which used water from the Upper Wet Dock to drive a water-wheel on the ebb tide, which in turn powered a set of pumps. (At high tide, an auxiliary set of pumps was used, powered by a horse gin.)

In 1699 Dummer adapted the channel leading to the Upper Wet Dock, enabling it to be closed off at each end by a set of gates, thus forming a second dry dock (called the "North Stone Dock" after it was rebuilt with stone altars in 1737, and known today as No 6 dock). Severed from the harbour, the Upper Wet Dock became a reservoir into which water from various nearby dry docks could be drained; it was vaulted and covered over at the end of the eighteenth century, but still exists today underground. By 1700 a shipbuilding slip had been constructed off the (Lower) Wet Dock, parallel with the dry dock (roughly where No 4 dry dock is today).

=== Eighteenth century ===
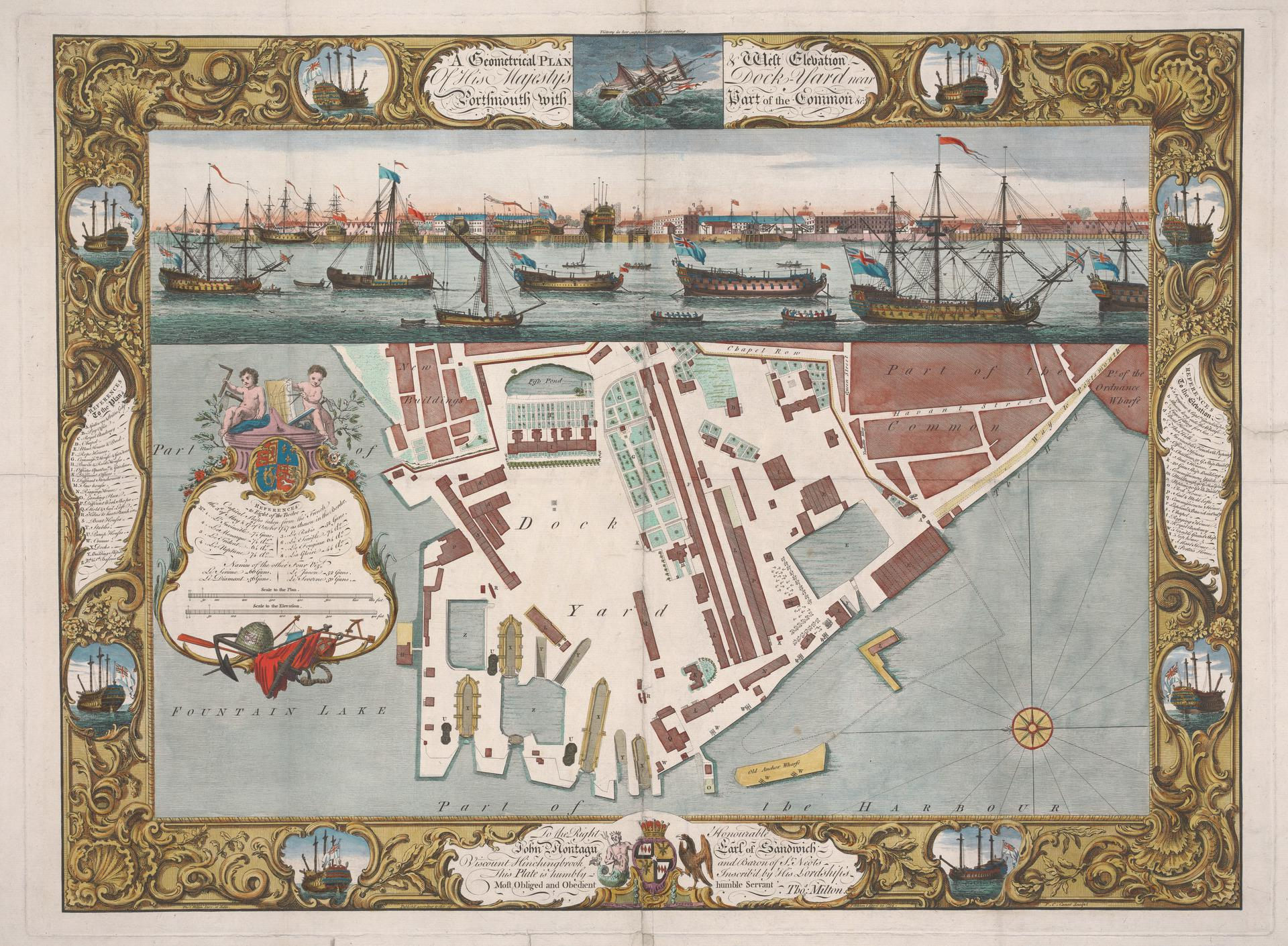
A Geometrical Plan & West Elevation of His Majesty's Dock-Yard near Portsmouth by Thomas Milton, 1754.

Between 1704 and 1712 a brick wall was built around the Dockyard, following the line of the town's 17th-century fortifications; together with a contemporary (though altered) gate and lodge, much of the wall still stands, serving its original purpose. A terrace of houses for the senior officers of the yard was built at around this time (Long Row, 1715–19); later in the century it was joined by a further terrace (Short Row, 1787). In 1733 a Royal Naval Academy for officer cadets was established within the Dockyard, the Navy's first shore-based training facility and a forerunner of Britannia Royal Naval College in Dartmouth.

==== The 'Great Rebuilding' ====
The second half of the eighteenth century was a key period in the development of Portsmouth (and indeed of the other Royal Dockyards). A substantial planned programme of expansion and modernisation was undertaken from 1761 onwards, driven (as would be future periods of expansion) by increases both in the size of individual ships and in the overall size of the fleet. In the 1760s the Lower Wet Dock (by then known as the Great Basin) was deepened, the Great Stone Dock was rebuilt and a new dry dock (known today as No 4 dock) was built alongside it over a five-year period from 1767. During 1771–76 the former Upper Wet Dock was reconfigured to serve as a reservoir into which water from the dry docks could be drained by way of culverts (enabling ships to be dry docked much more speedily). From 1789 work was begun on replacing the old wooden South Dock with a modern stone dry dock (known today as No 1 dock, it currently accommodates the museum ship HMS M33).

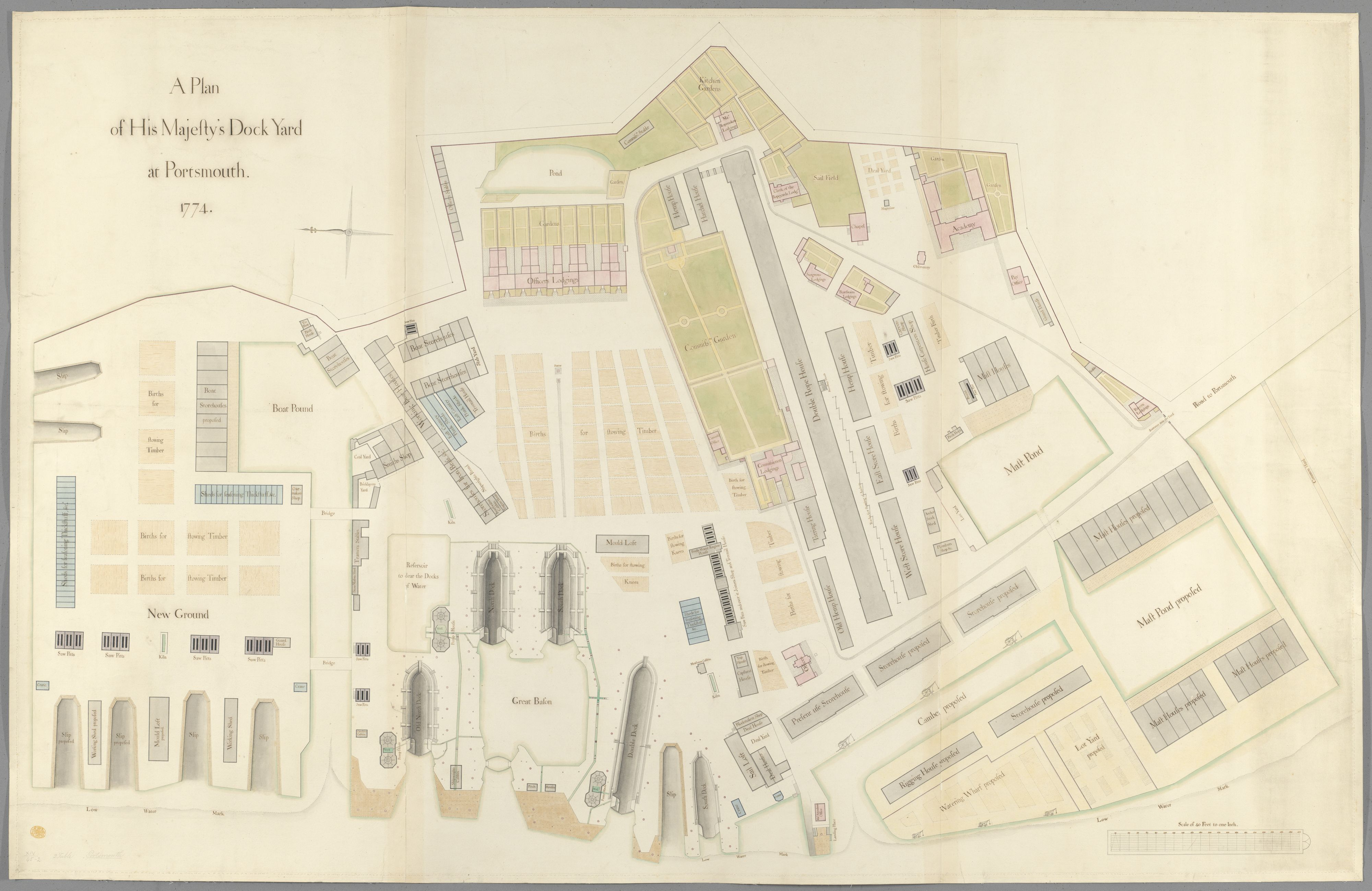
Plan, dated 1774, showing the 'New Ground' to the north (left) and planned extension to the south-west (bottom right).

North of the reservoir a channel was dug leading to a new boat basin, beyond which several shipbuilding slips were constructed on reclaimed land at what became known as the North Corner of the dockyard. The rest of the reclaimed land was given over to storage space for timber with saw pits and seasoning sheds alongside, as shown in the dockyard model of 1774.

Several of Portsmouth Dockyard's most notable historic buildings date from this period, with several older wooden structures being replaced in brick on a larger scale. The three great storehouses (Nos 9, 10 & 11) were built between 1764 and 1785 on a wharf, alongside a deep canal (or camber) which allowed transport and merchant vessels to moor and load or unload goods; the camber was rebuilt in Portland stone between 1773 and 1785. On the other side of the camber, on newly reclaimed land, two more sizeable brick storehouses were built to serve as a sail loft and a rigging store; the reclaimed land was later named Watering Island after a fresh water supply was provided for ships mooring alongside.

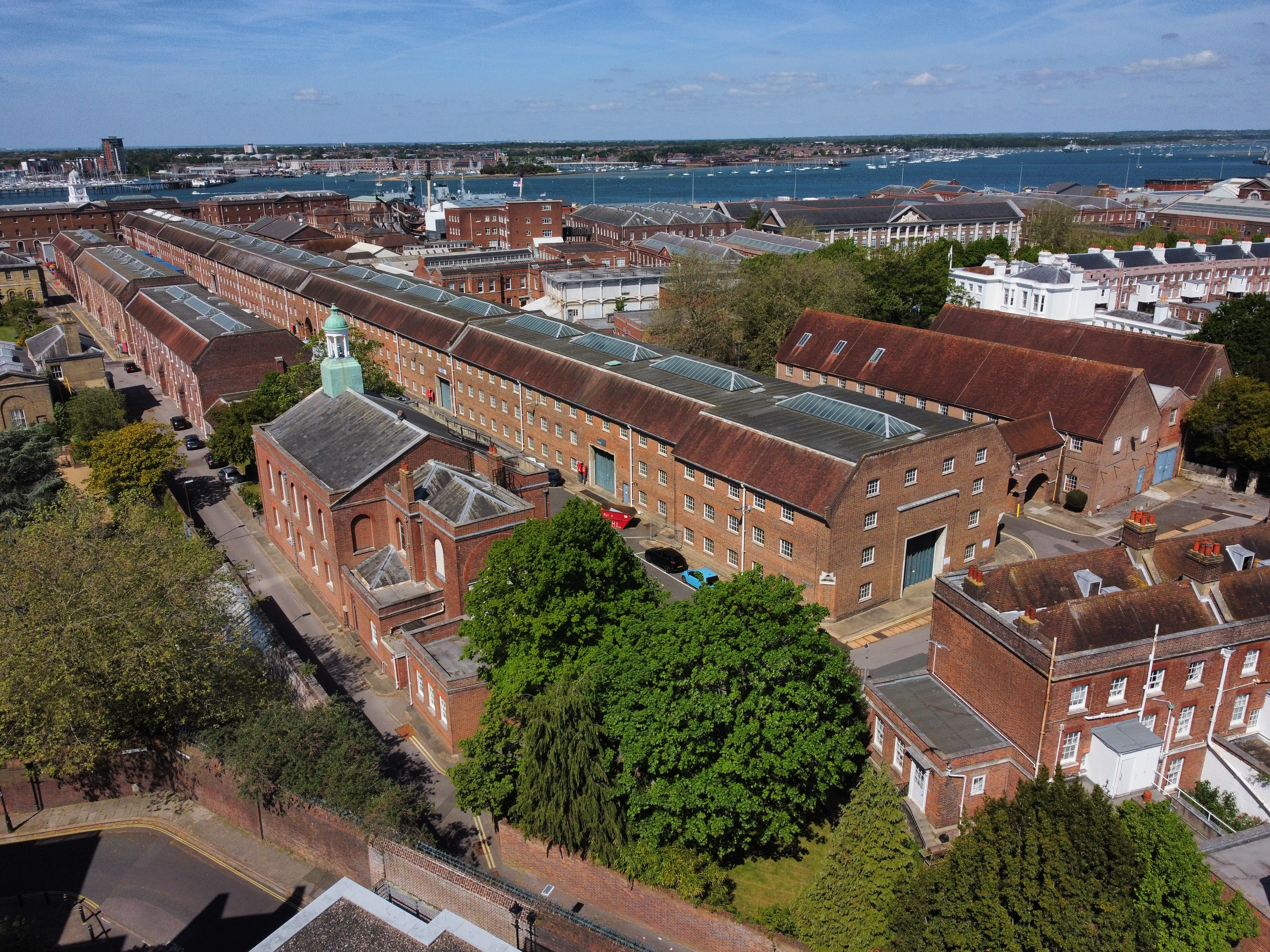
The long Double Rope House and parallel storehouses (with St Ann's Church in the foreground).

The Great Ropehouse, a double ropery over 1,000 ft (300 m) in length, dates from the same period. It is, however, the sixth ropehouse (since 1665) to have stood on the site. Both its immediate predecessors were destroyed by fire (in 1760 and 1770) and the current building was itself gutted by fire in 1776 as the result of an arson attack. It was called a 'double' ropery because the spinning and laying stages took place in the same building (on different floors) rather than on two separate sites. Other buildings associated with ropemaking (including hemp houses, a hatchelling house, tarring house and storehouses) were laid out alongside and parallel to the ropehouse; they largely date from the same period.

The ropeyard required considerable hemp supplies for its production. The Portsouth Dockyard Commissioner, William Gifford, reported a ketch The George, carrying 60 tons of hemp from Archangel, arriving on 17 December 1703.

Later, in 1784, a large new house was built for the Dockyard Commissioner. Unusually for the time it was designed by a civilian architect (Samuel Wyatt, with Thomas Telford as clerk-of-works); most other dockyard buildings were designed in-house. The dockyard chapel, built eighty years earlier, was demolished to make way for the new Commissioner's house and a new chapel (St Ann's Church) was built nearby. At the same time a set of offices for the senior officers of the yard was built (in place of an earlier office block), overlooking the docks and basin; it continues to provide office space to this day.

After the old Commissioner's House had been demolished, four identical quadrangular buildings were built, flanking the timber ground east of the Basin; as well as providing storage space, they accommodated workshops for a variety of trades, including joiners, wheelwrights, wood-carvers, capstan-makers and various other craftsmen. A new smithery was also built nearby, immediately to the north (the latest in a succession of smiths' shops to have been built on the site); dating from 1791, it was mainly occupied with anchor making. Ten years later this process was vividly described: "The immense masses of the anchors, the ponderous hammers, the vast size of the bellows, the roaring of the flaming furnaces, the reverberations of the falling cumbrous hammers, and the fiery pieces of metal flying in all directions, are truly awful, grand and picturesque".

18th-century buildings and structures in the Dockyard
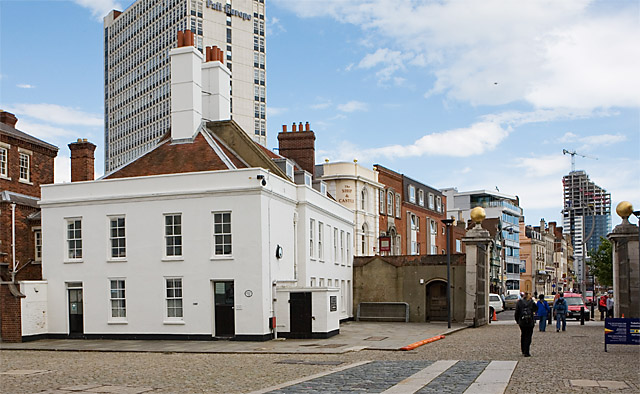
Porters' Lodge (1708), the oldest surviving building in the Dockyard.

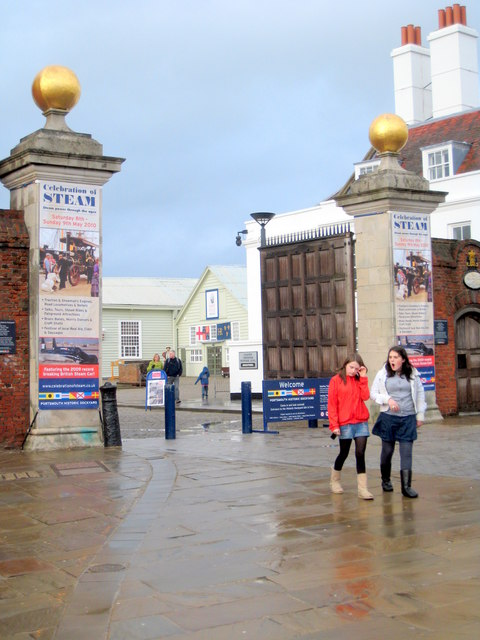
Main Gate (1711, widened c.1940 and now known as Victory Gate).

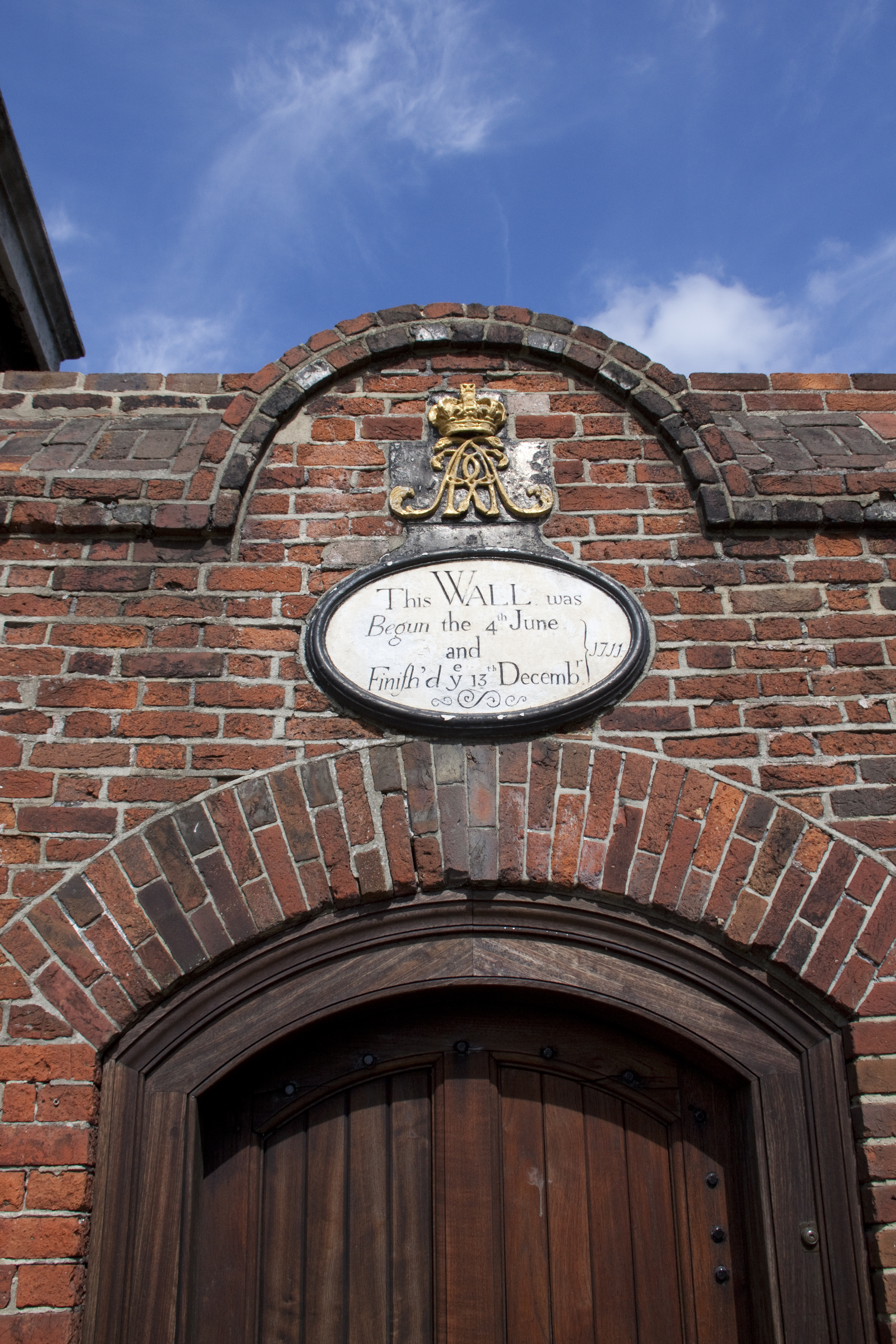
1711 plaque on the perimeter wall.

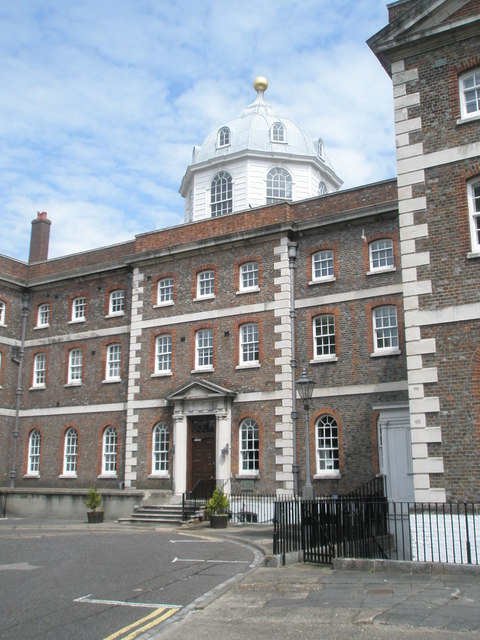
Royal Naval Academy building (1732); it later accommodated the RN Navigation School (HMS Dryad) until 1941.

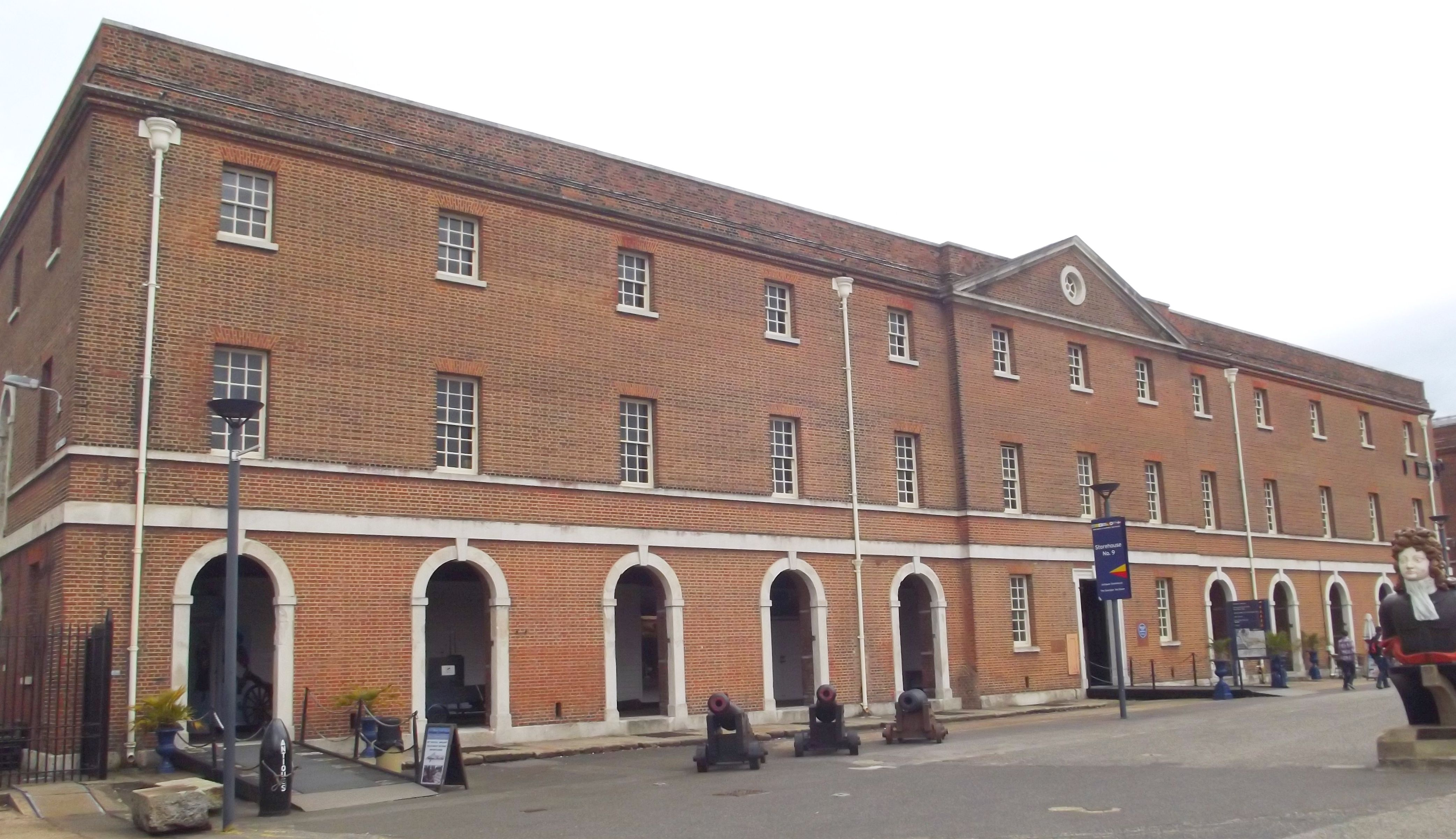
No 9 Storehouse (1782) – one of a set of three with Nos 10 and 11.

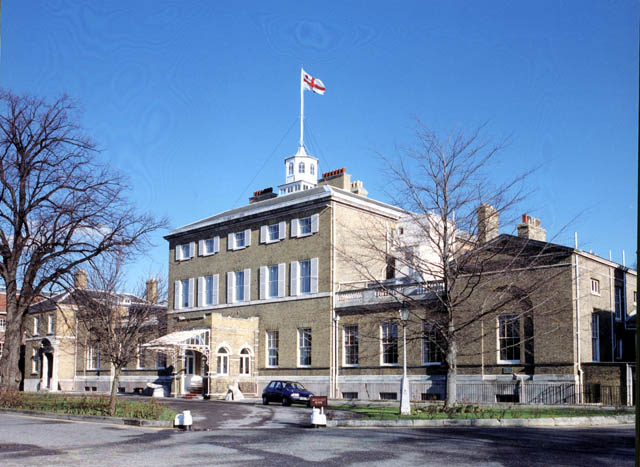
Admiralty House, built as the Commissioner's House in 1784.

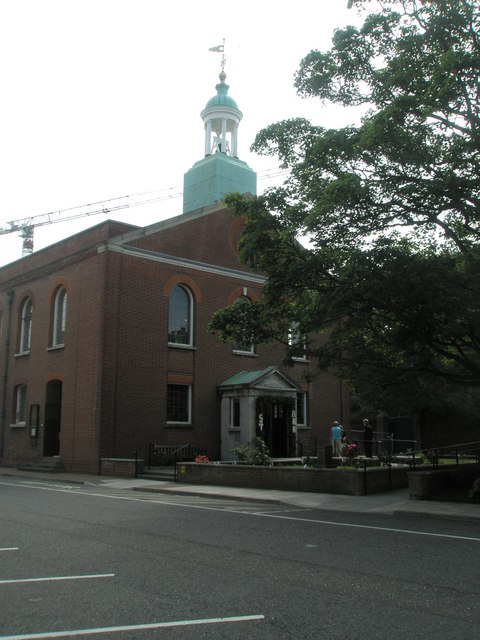
St Ann's Church (1787, rebuilt 1956 after bomb damage).

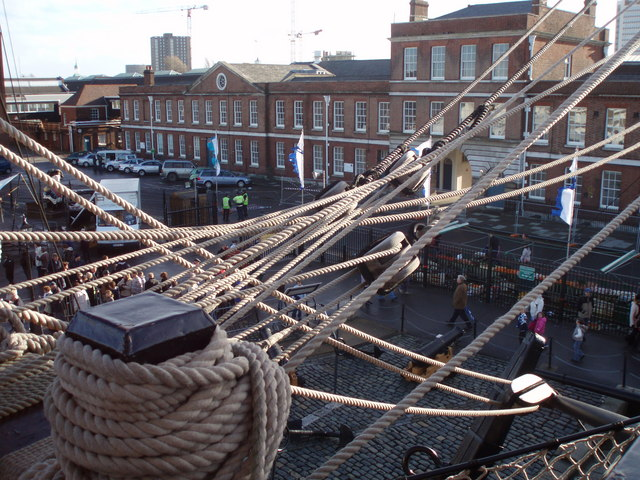
South Office Block (1786–1789).

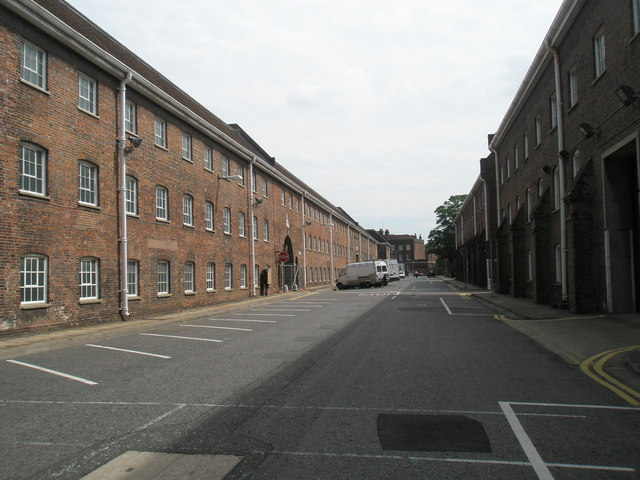
Double Ropery (left, 1771-1775) and associated storehouses (right, 1771–1781). Between them is Anchor Lane, where anchors were formerly stored in the open air until required.

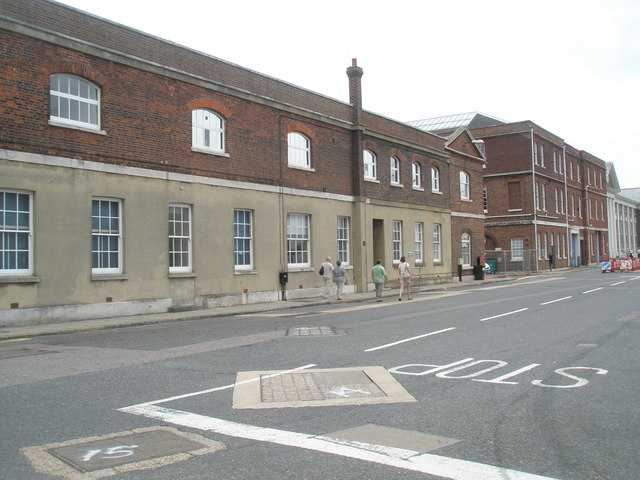
Former Smithery (left, 1791-1794); No 33 Store (right, 1782): one of four identical blocks of combined stores and workshops.

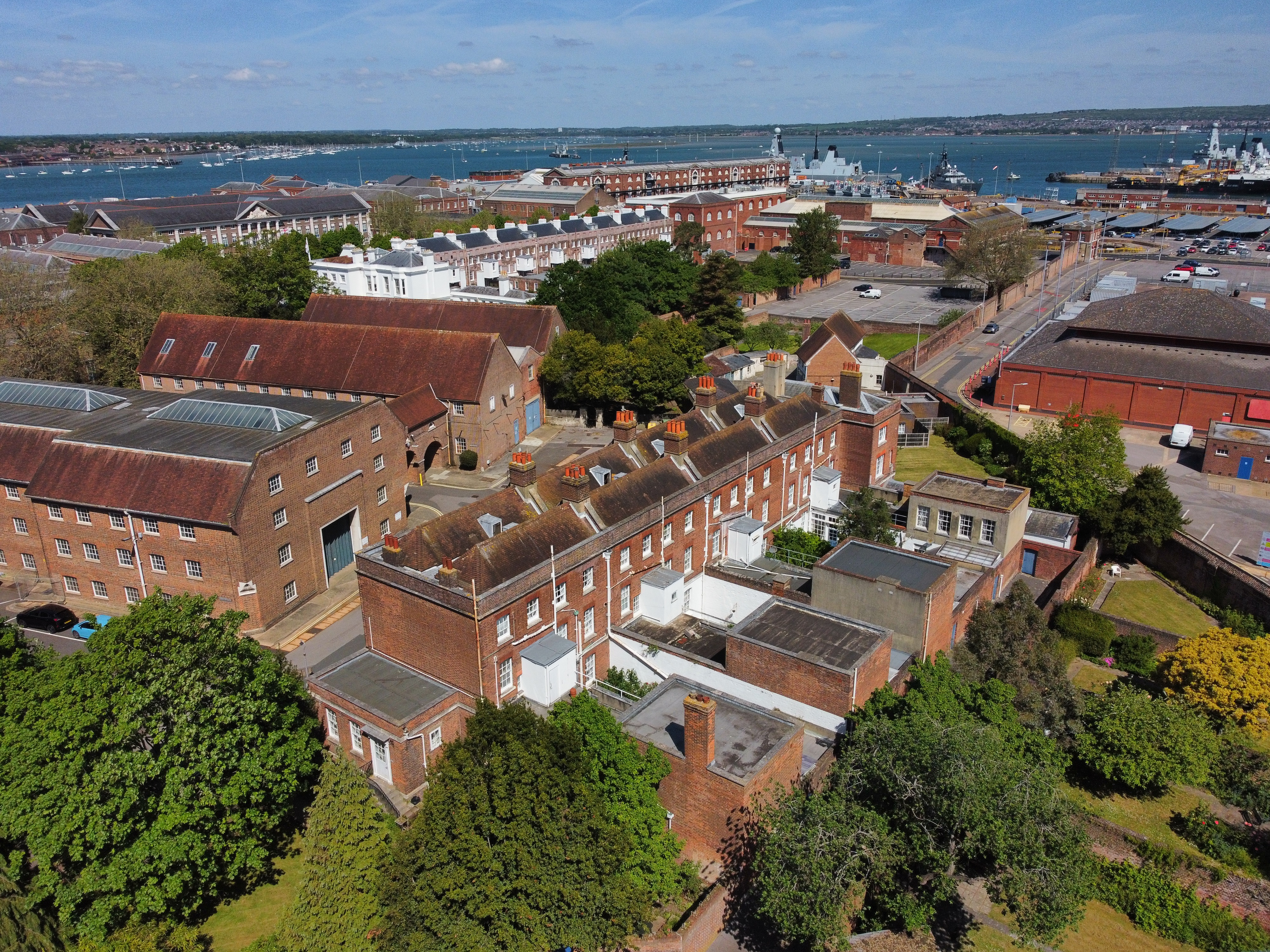
Short Row (1787): officers' terraced houses.

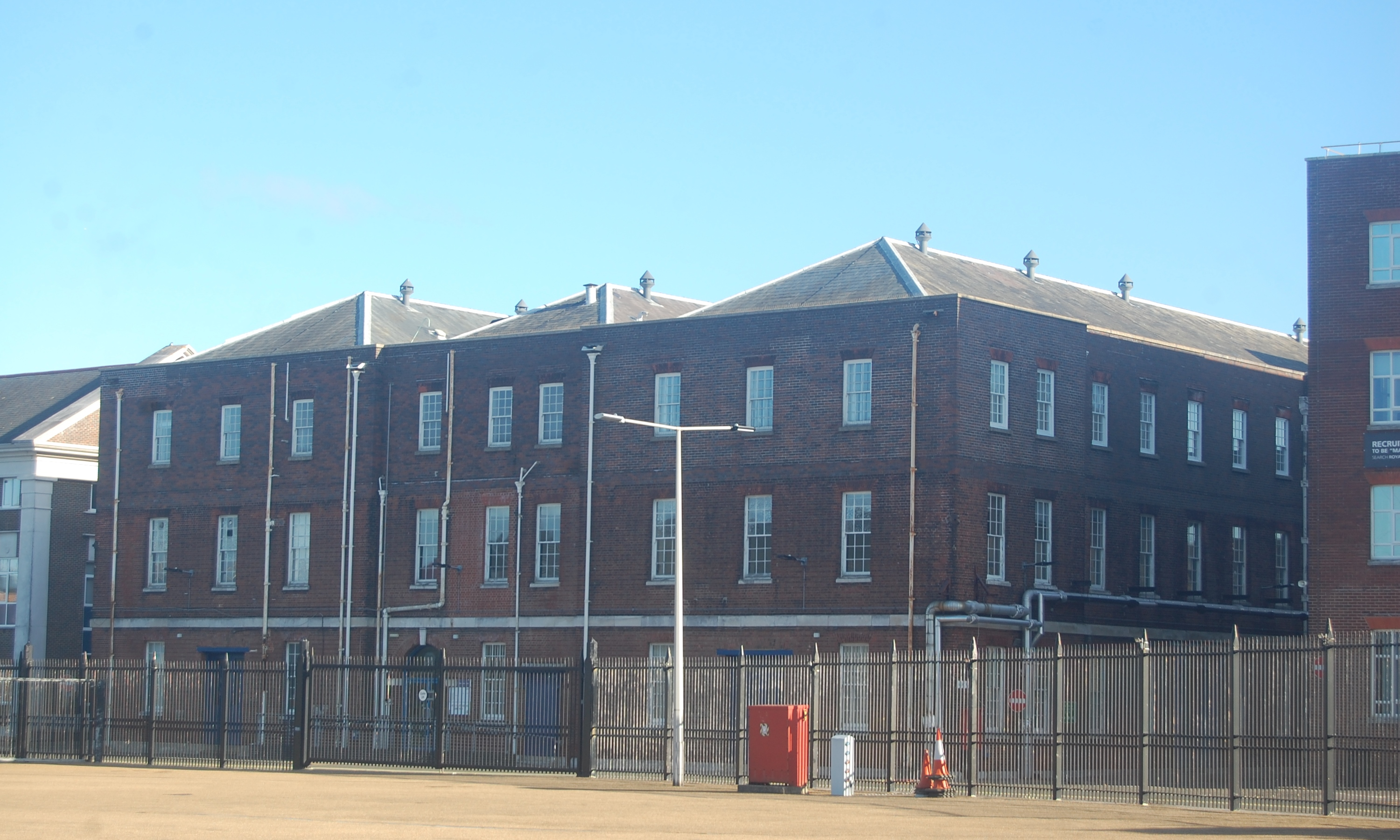
No 24 Store (1783): one of four identical blocks of combined stores and workshops.

==== Samuel Bentham and industrial revolution ====
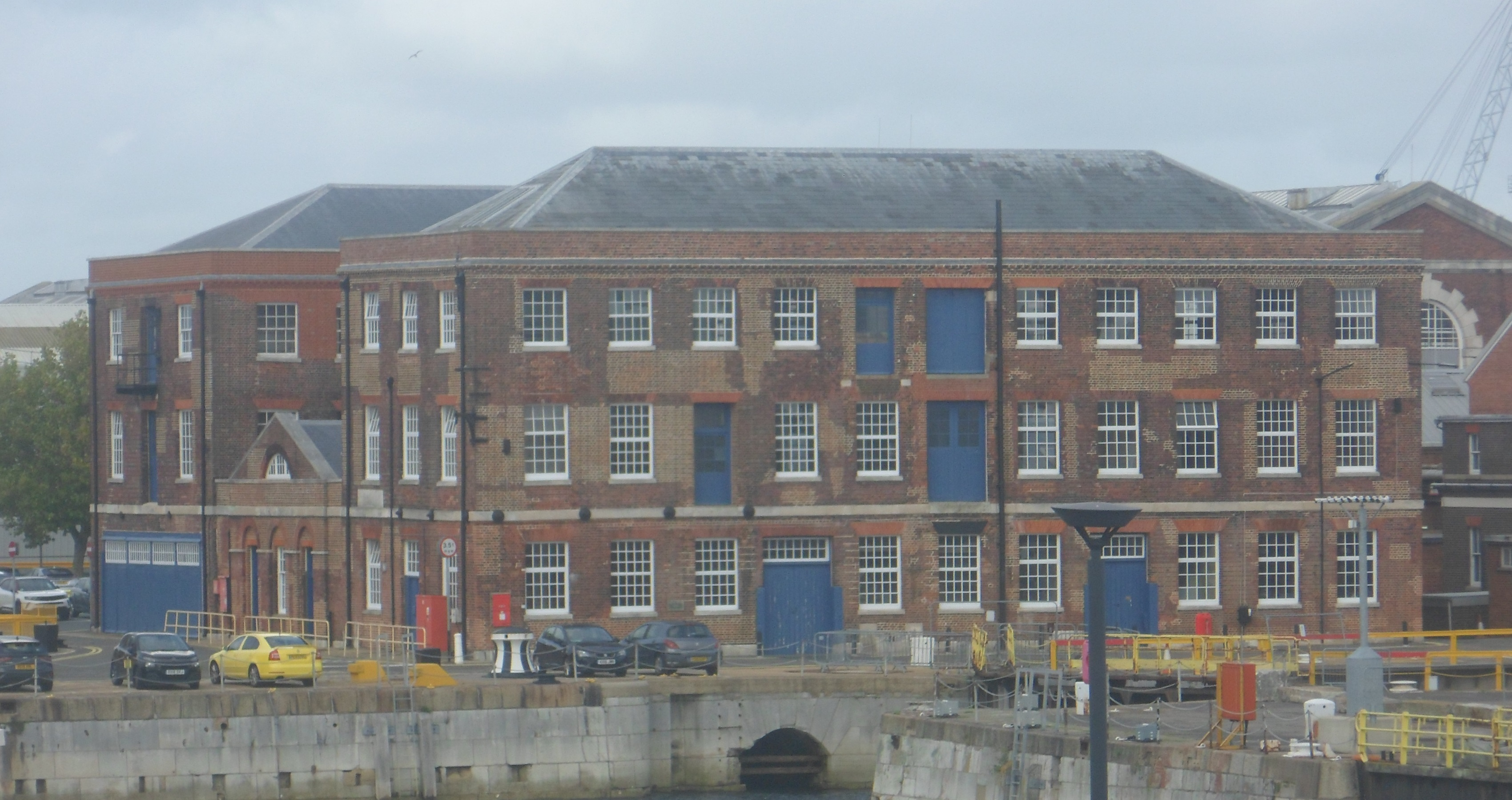
Bentham's parallel 3-storey buildings contained wood mills, water tanks and pumping engines; while the central, single-storey workshop housed Brunel's pioneering block mills.

In 1796 Samuel Bentham was appointed Inspector General of Naval Works by the Admiralty with the brief of modernising the Royal Dockyards. As such, he took on responsibility for overseeing the continued rebuilding at Portsmouth and initiated further key engineering works. A prolific inventor and precision engineer, Bentham's initiatives at Portsmouth ranged from instituting new management principles in the manufacturing departments to developing the first successful steam-powered bucket dredger, which began work in the harbour in 1802.

The 1761 rebuilding plan had envisaged the old wooden double dock being refurbished, but Bentham instead proposed expanding the Basin (building over the double dock in the process) and adding a further pair of single docks built entirely of stone (unlike previous 'stone docks' which had had timber floors). The proposal was accepted; the new docks (now known as Nos 2 and 3 docks) were completed in 1802-3 and are still in place today (accommodating HMS Victory and the Mary Rose respectively). While constructing a new entrance to the Basin, Bentham introduced the innovation of an inverted masonry arch to tie together the walls on either side. He went on to use the same principle in constructing the new dry docks attached to the basin; it soon became standard for dock construction around the world. In constructing the docks and basin he made pioneering use of Smeaton's waterproof cement. He also designed a "ship caisson" to close off the entrance to the basin (another innovation which soon became a standard design).

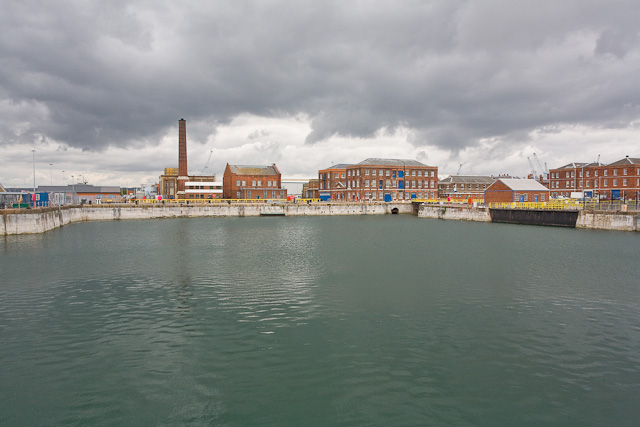
View across No 1 Basin toward Brunel's Block Mills (centre-right, nestled between Bentham's saw mills and pump house). A new pump house (centre-left, with boiler house and chimney alongside) was built in 1909.

To deal with the increasing number of docks, Bentham in 1797 proposed replacing one of the horse pumps above the reservoir with a steam engine. His plan was that the engine should be used not only to drain the reservoir (by night) but also to drive a sawmill and woodworking machinery (during the day); he also envisaged linking it to a freshwater well, to enable water to be pumped through a network of pipes to various parts of the dockyard. A table engine, designed by Bentham's staff chemist James Sadler, was installed in 1799; it represented the first use of steam power in a Royal Naval Yard. By 1800 a second steam engine (a Boulton & Watt beam engine) was being installed alongside the first. Meanwhile, Bentham designed and built a series of subterranean vaulted chambers over the reservoir, upon which he erected a pair of parallel three-storey workshops to contain reciprocating and circular saws, planning machines and morticing machines, built to his own designs, to be driven by the two engines (which were accommodated together with their boilers in the south workshop). Tanks installed on the upper floor provided a head of water for Bentham's aforementioned dockyard-wide pipe network, providing both salt water for firefighting and fresh water for various uses (including, for the first time, provision of drinking water to ships on the wharves) sourced from a newly sunk 274 ft well.

Between the two Wood Mills buildings a single-storey workshop was built in 1802 to accommodate what soon came to be recognised as the world's first steam-powered factory for mass production: Portsmouth Block Mills. Marc Brunel, father of Isambard Kingdom Brunel, famously designed the machines, which manufactured ships' pulley blocks through a total of fifteen separate stages of production. Having been presented with Brunel's designs, which would be built by Henry Maudslay, Bentham incorporated them into his woodworking complex and linked them to the engines by way of line shafts.

At the same time as building his Wood Mills, Bentham, with his deputy Simon Goodrich, was constructing a Metal Mills complex a little to the north-east. Alongside a smithery were a copper-smelting furnace and refinery, and a steam engine which drove a rolling mill and tilt hammers. Begun in 1801, these facilities were for recycling the copper sheathing of ships' hulls. In 1804 the works were extended to accommodate machinery for the rolling of iron to make bars and bolts. A millwrights' shop was also established nearby. The Wood Mills, Block Mills, Metal Mills and Millwrights' department were all placed under Goodrich's supervision as Mechanist to the Royal Navy.

=== Nineteenth century ===
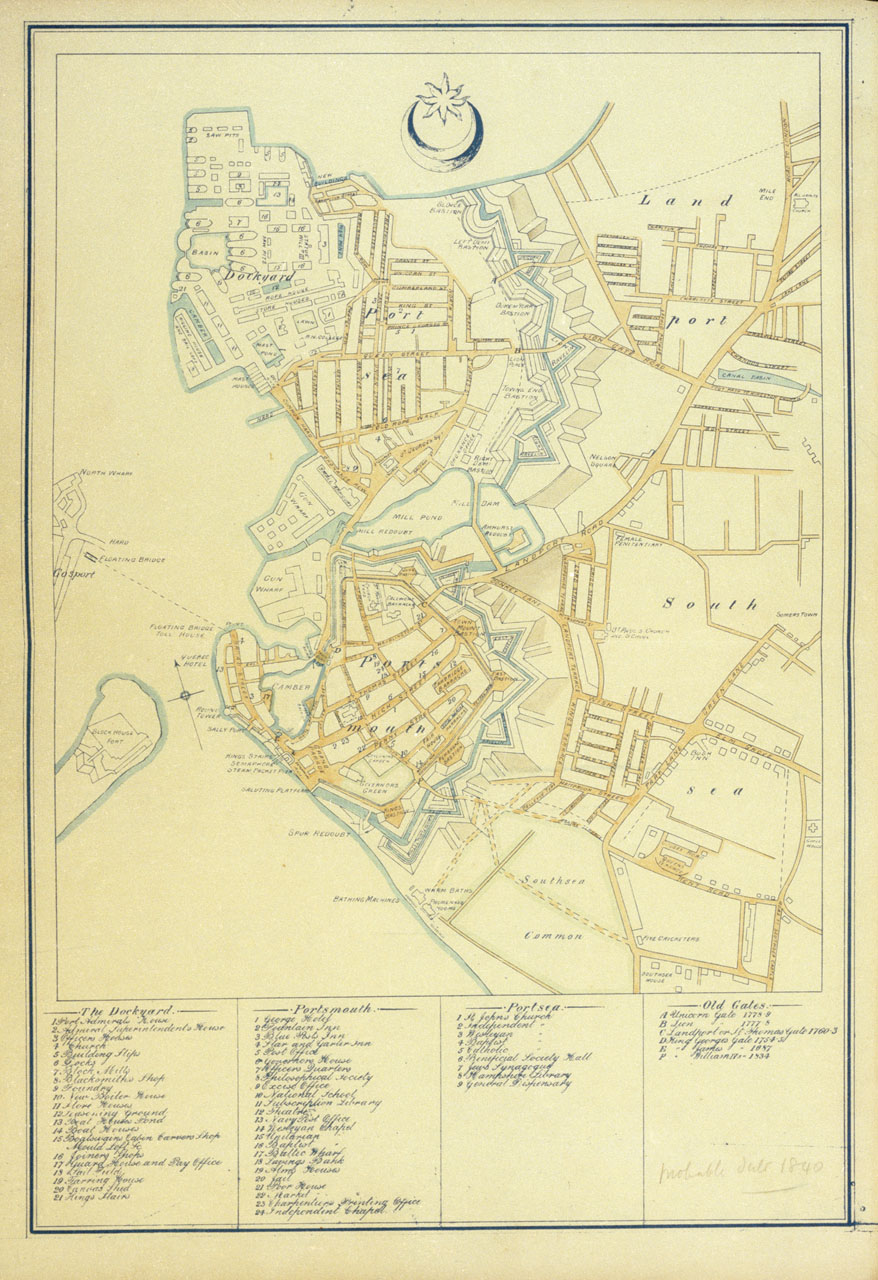
Map of Portsmouth (c. 1840) showing the Dockyard (top left) before construction of the new Steam Factory and Basin.

In 1800, the Royal Navy had 684 ships and the Dockyard was the largest industrial complex in the world. In 1805 Horatio Nelson toured the newly opened block mills before embarking from Portsmouth on HMS Victory, leaving Britain for the last time before his death at the Battle of Trafalgar.

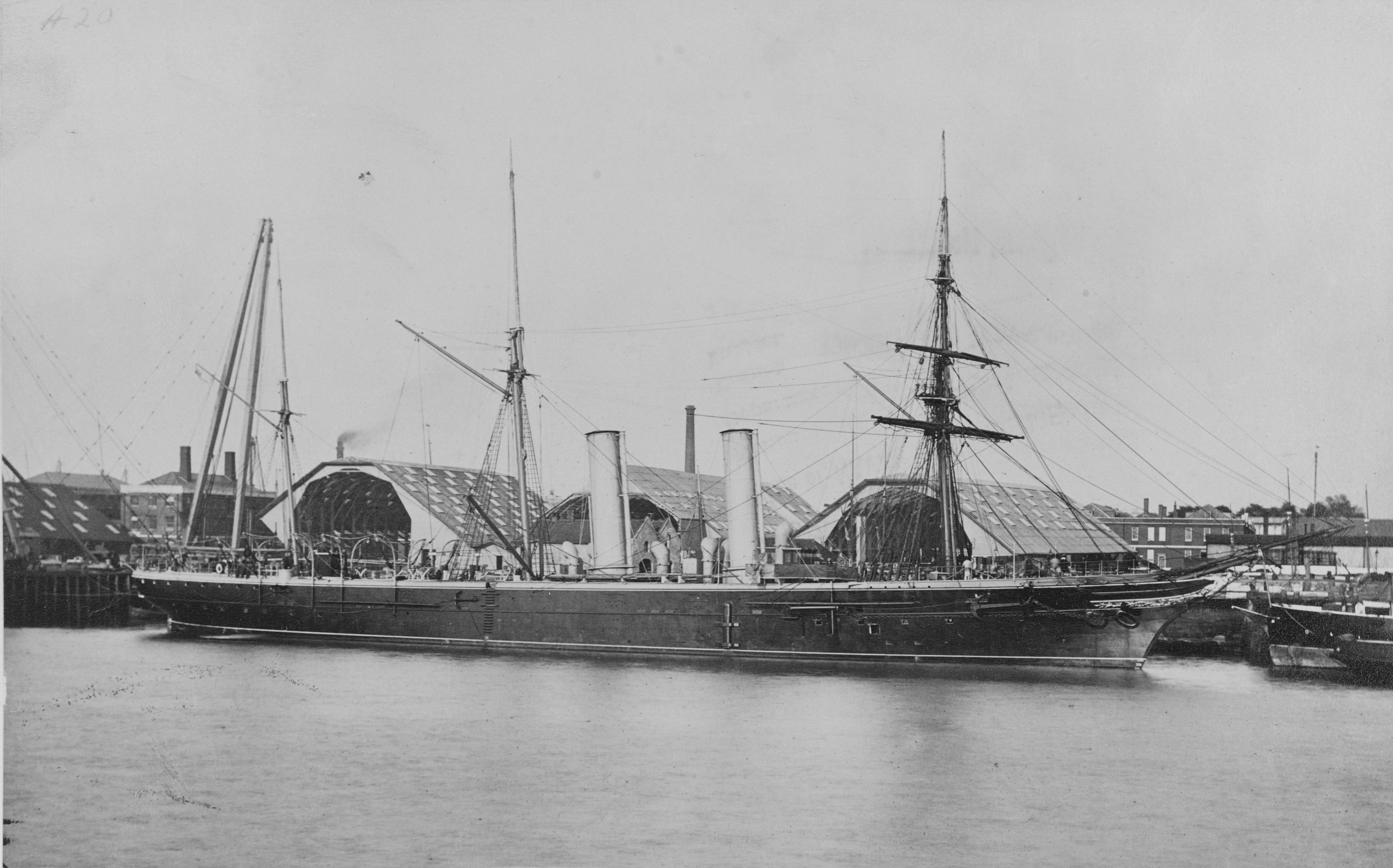
Wooden covers over dry docks Nos 3, 4 and 5; in the foreground HMS Iris.

From 1814 wooden covers were built over some of the slips and docks, to designs by Robert Seppings.

From 1815 the system of Dockyard apprenticeship was supplemented by the establishment of a School of Naval Architecture in Portsmouth (for training potential Master Shipwrights), initially housed in the building which faces Admiralty House on South Terrace. Taking on students from the age of 14, this was the forerunner of Portsmouth Dockyard School (later Technical College) which continued to provide specialist training until 1970.

==== Victorian dockyard expansion ====
The adoption of steam propulsion for warships led to large-scale changes in the Royal Dockyards, which had been built in the Age of Sail. The Navy's first 'steam factory' was built at Woolwich in 1839; but it soon became clear that the site was far too small to cope with this revolutionary change in ship building and maintenance.

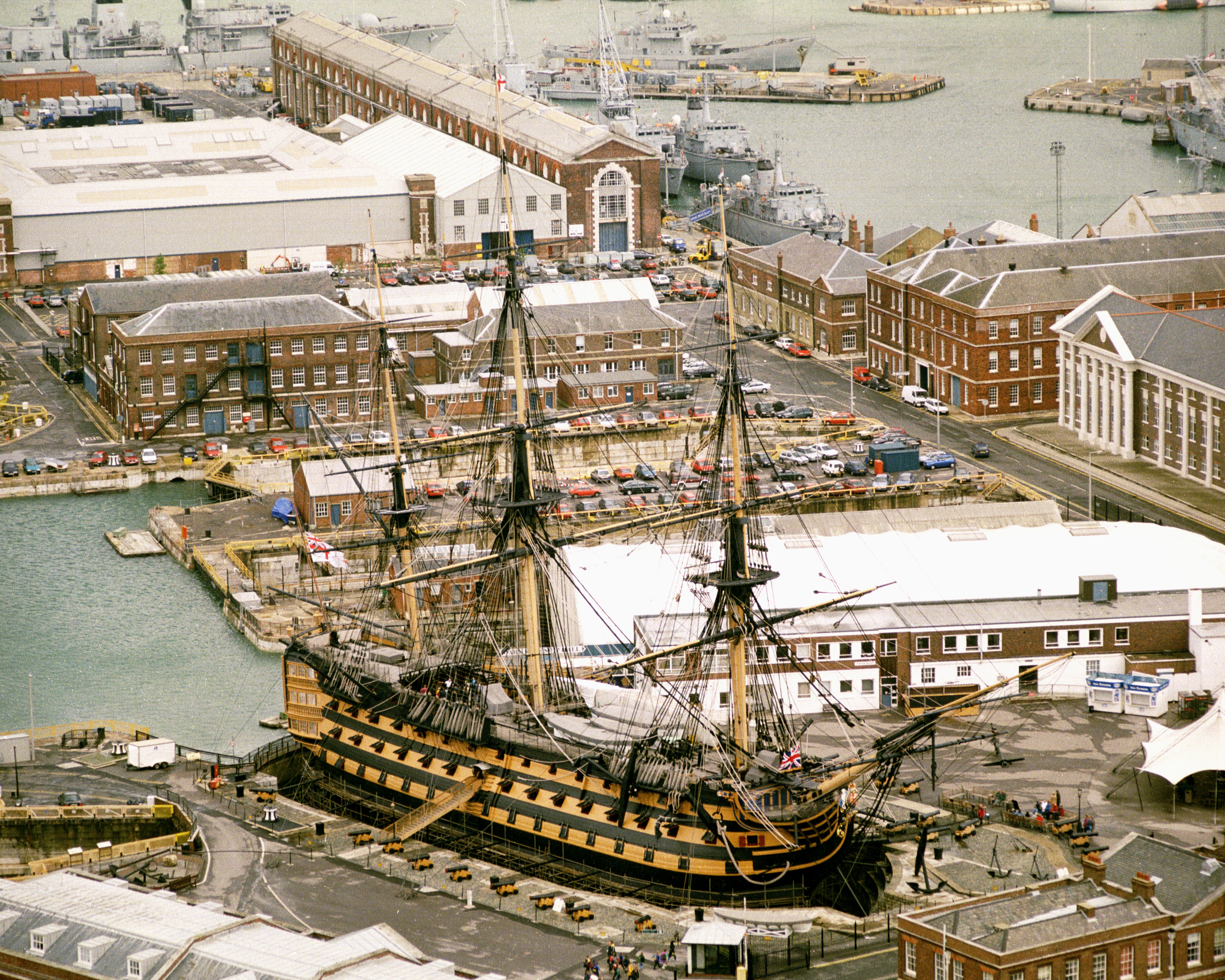
View north from the older section of the Dockyard toward the former Smithery, Erecting Shop, Steam Factory and No 2 Basin (left to right, top of picture).

Therefore, in 1843, work began in Portsmouth on further reclamation of land to the north of the then Dockyard to create a new 7-acre basin (known today as No 2 Basin) with a sizeable factory alongside for manufacturing marine steam engines. The Steam Factory, on the western edge of the basin, housed a series of workshops: for construction and repair of boilers, for punching and shearing and for heavy turning; there was also an erecting shop for assembling the finished engines. The upper floor housed pattern shops, fitting shops and other light engineering workshops. Line shafts throughout were powered by an 80hp steam engine accommodated to the rear. A new Brass and Iron Foundry was also built soon afterwards, on the southern edge of the basin, and in 1852 the Great Steam Smithery was opened alongside the Steam Factory (where Bentham's Metal Mills had formerly stood), containing a pair of steam hammers designed by James Nasmyth. The infrastructure and buildings were designed by a group of Royal Engineer officers, overseen by Captains Sir William Denison and Henry James. (The new steam basin was built over what had been the boat pond and boat houses; so in 1845 a new facility (No 6 Boathouse) was built alongside the mast pond, to the south, which was converted into a boat pond.)

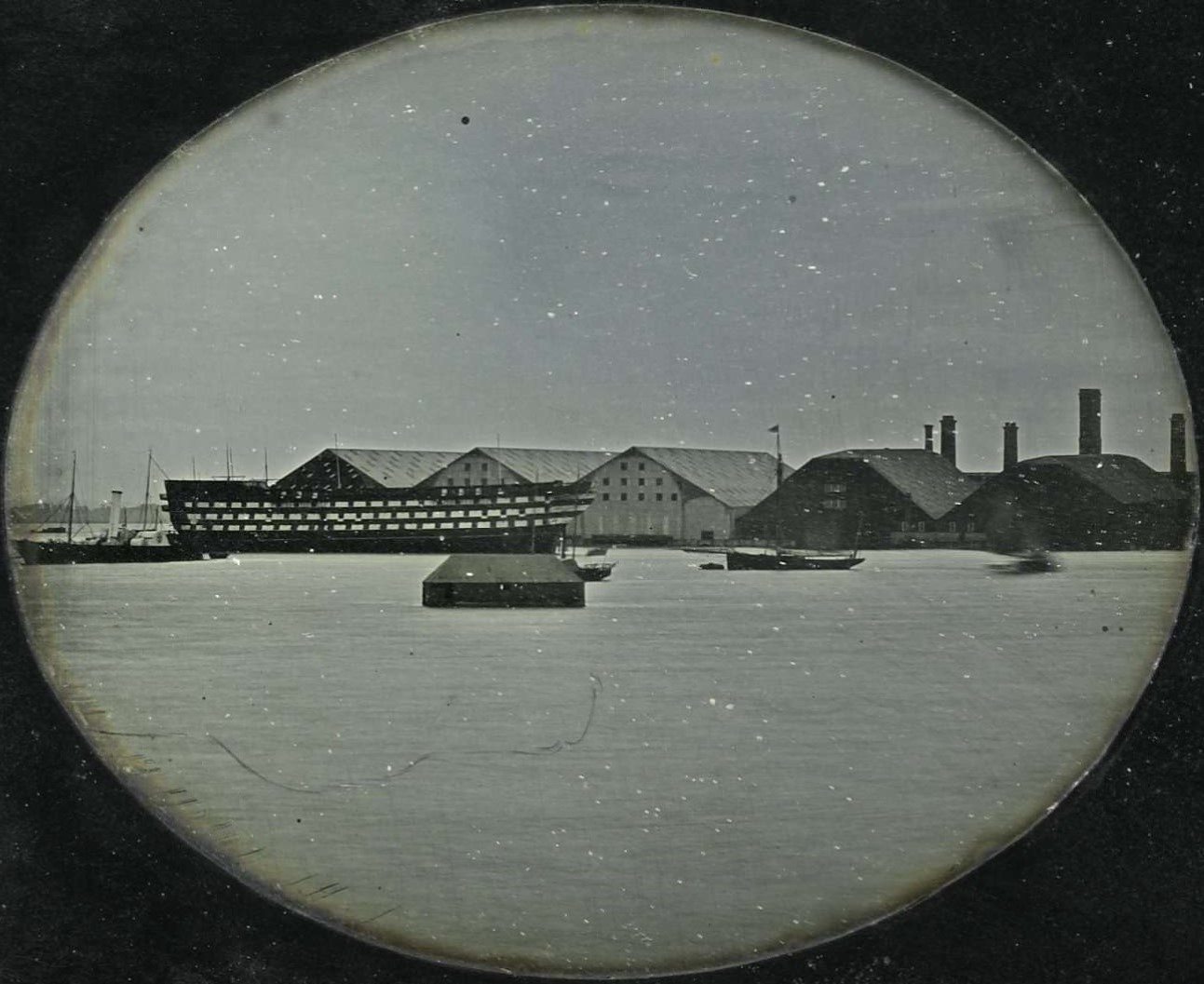
Covered slips 1–5 in 1855 (launch of HMS Marlborough). The wooden roofs over slips 1 & 2 (right) were destroyed in a fire in January 1915; the metal roof over No. 5 slip (far left) was removed in the late 19th century.

Three new dry docks were constructed over the next 20 years, opening off the new basin, and another was built on reclaimed land west of the basin, immediately north of the shipbuilding slips. The slips were now five in number, with Nos. 3–5 being covered by interlinking metal roofs (believed to have comprised the widest iron span in Britain when built in 1845).

Developments in shipbuilding technology, however, led to several of the new amenities having to be rebuilt and expanded (almost as soon as they were finished). A much larger Iron Foundry was opened in 1861, immediately to the east of its predecessor; it was further expanded in the following decade. In 1867 a very large Armour Plate Workshop was opened, filling the space between the new North and South dry docks on the eastern side of the basin.

In 1860 policing of the dockyard was also transferred to the new No. 2 Division of the Metropolitan Police, a role it fulfilled until 1933.

==== The 'Great Extension' ====
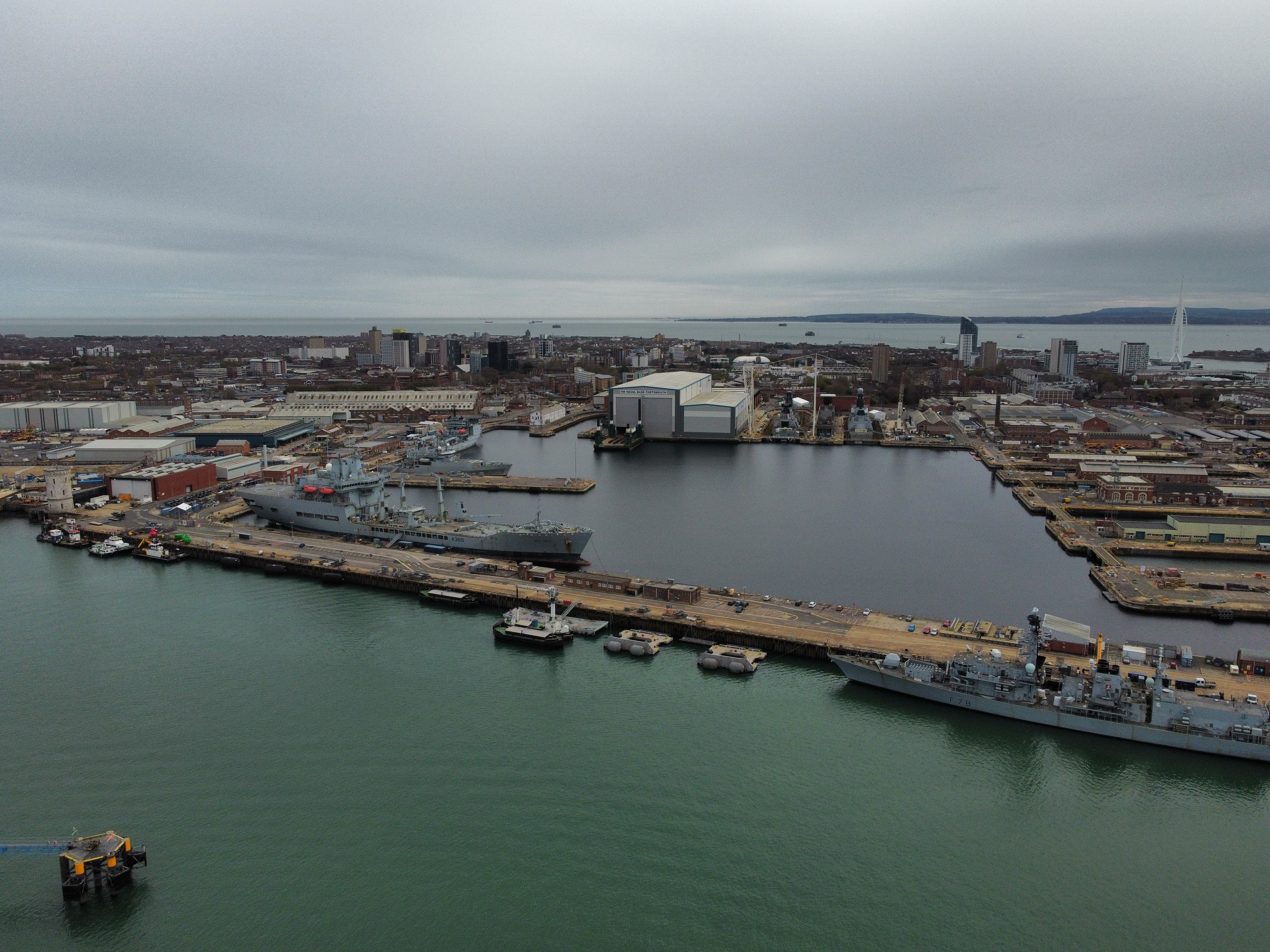
Number 3 Basin was constructed (as three interlocking basins) between 1867 and 1881.

Technological change affected not only ships' means of propulsion, but the materials from which they were built. By 1860 wooden warships, vulnerable as they were to modern armaments, had been rendered largely obsolescent. The changeover to metal hulls not only required new building techniques, but also heralded a dramatic and ongoing increase in the potential size of new vessels. The Dockyards found themselves having to expand in kind. At Portsmouth, plans were drawn up in the late 1850s for further land reclamation north and east of the new Steam Basin, and from 1867 work was begun on a complex of three new interconnected basins, each of 14–22 acres. Each basin served a different purpose: ships would proceed from the repairing basin, to the rigging basin, to the fitting-out basin, and exit from there into a new tidal basin, ready to take on fuel alongside the sizeable coaling wharf there.

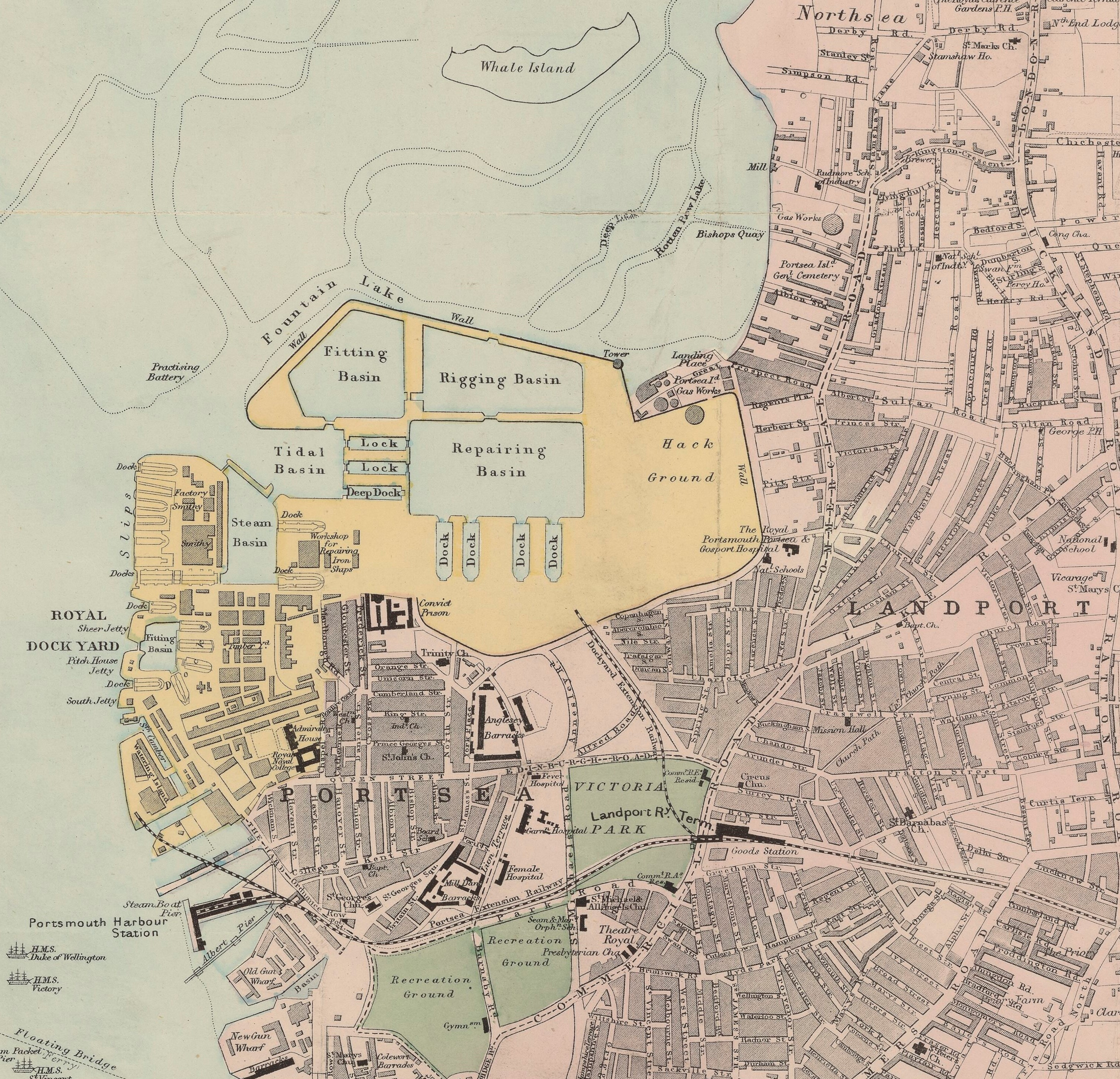
Late 19th-century map showing the interlocking basins within the Royal Dockyard (shaded yellow).

Three dry docks were also constructed as part of the plan, as well as parallel pair of sizeable locks for entry into the basin complex; the contemporary pumping station which stands nearby not only served to drain these docks and locks, but also delivered compressed air to power equipment around the edges of the basins: five cranes, seven caissons and forty capstans were run on compressed air from the pump house.

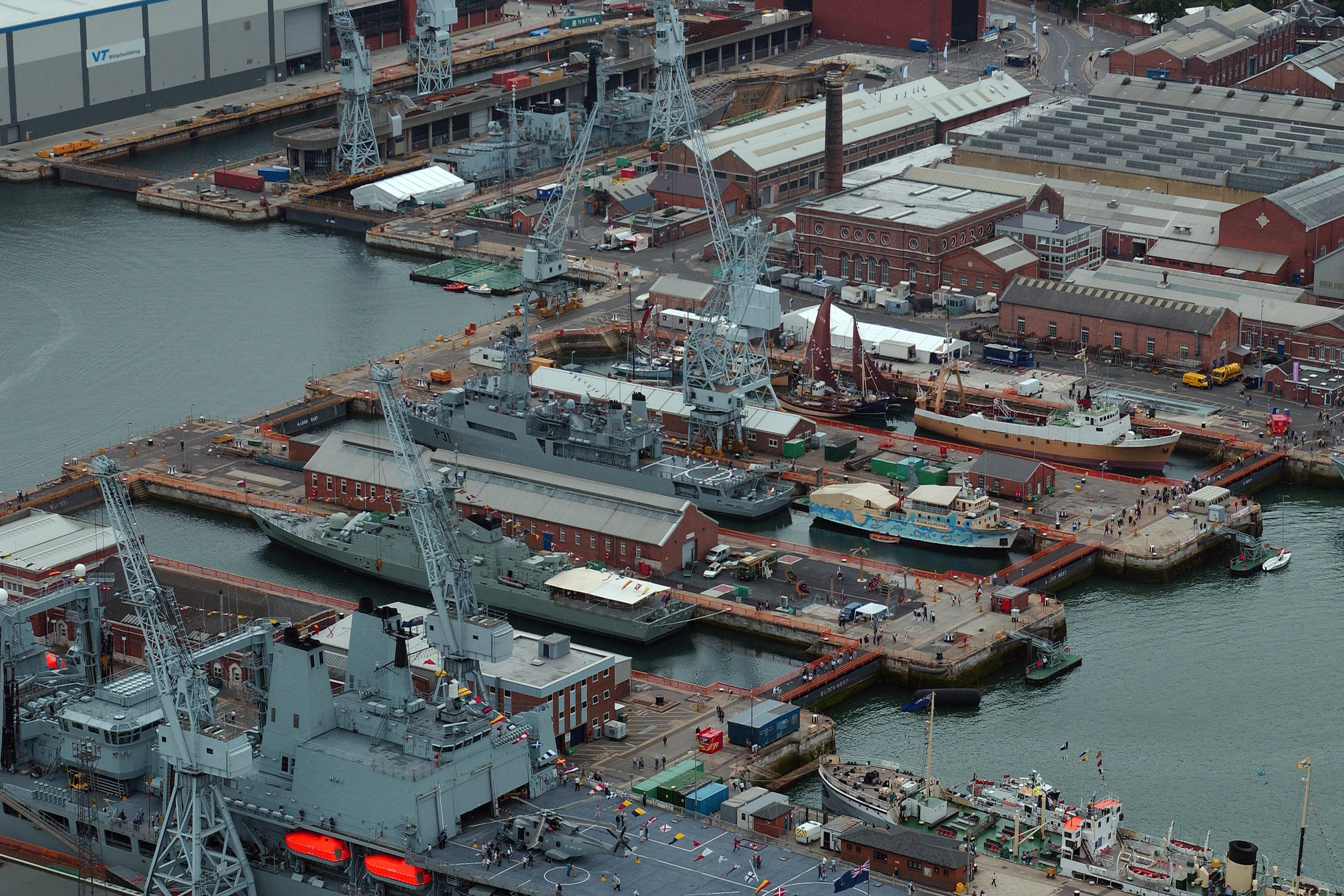
Locks and dry docks at the south-west corner of No 3 Basin; the building with the chimney is Main Pumping Station of 1878, beyond which is the former gun-mounting workshop.

The "Great Extension" of Portsmouth Dockyard was largely completed by 1881. Alongside the new Basins new buildings were erected, on a huge scale, to accommodate new manufacturing and construction processes. These included a gun-mounting workshop (built alongside the pumping station in 1881) which produced gun turrets, and a torpedo workshop (built to the east of No 12 dock in 1886).

Before the end of the century, it was recognised that there would have to be still further expansion across all the Royal Dockyards in order to keep pace with the increasing likely size of future naval vessels. At Portsmouth two more dry docks, Nos 14 & 15, were built alongside the Repairing Basin in 1896; (within ten years these, together with the adjacent docks 12 & 13, had to be extended, and by the start of World War I Dock No 14 was over 720 ft in length).

==== The dockyard railway ====
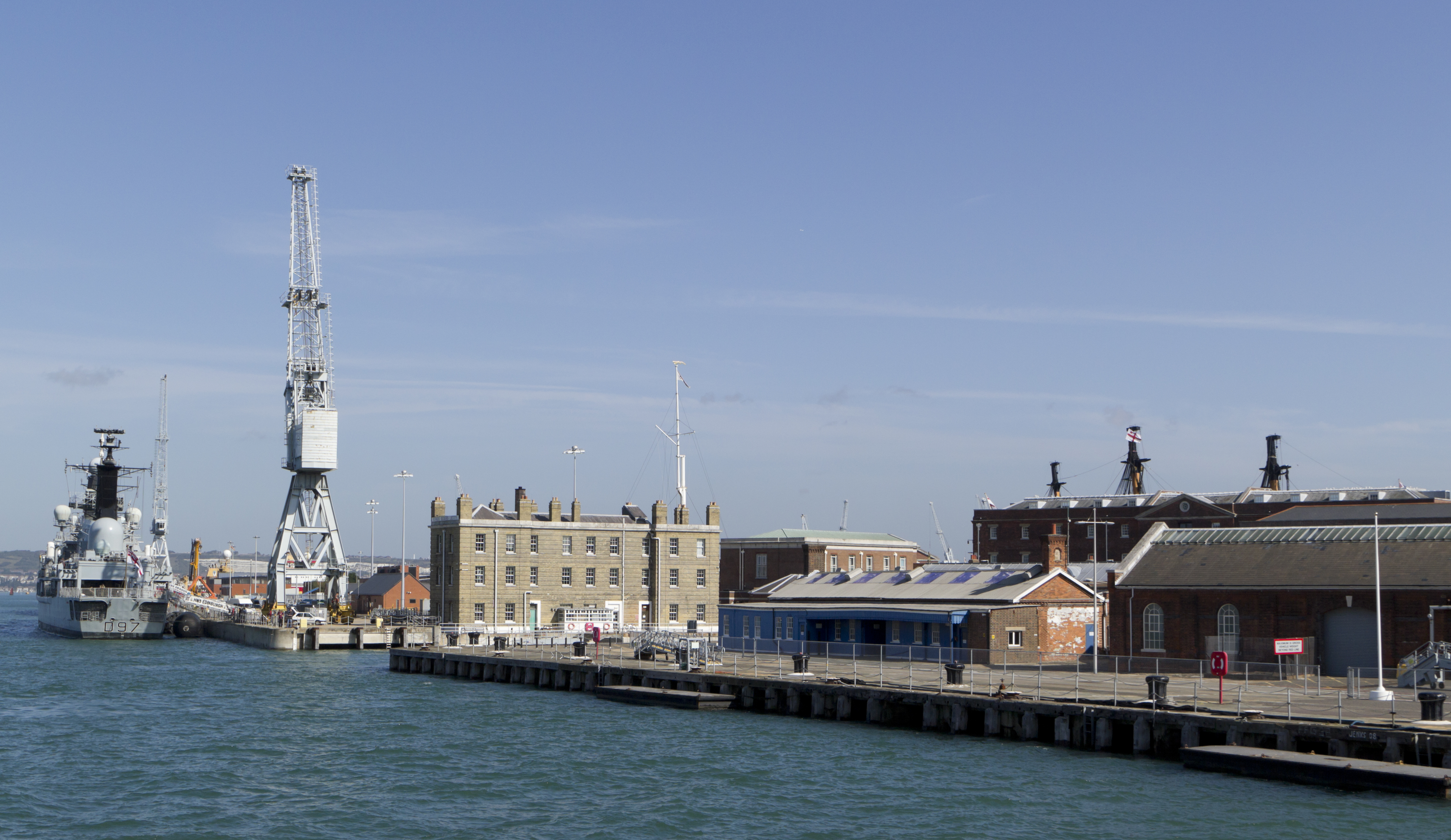
Left to right: HMS Edinburgh, Quayside crane, former QHM offices and flagstaff (1850), former Railway station (1878), No 1 Store (1905).

In 1843 construction began on a railway system within the dockyard. In 1846 this was connected to Portsmouth Town railway station via what became known as the Admiralty Line. By 1952 there was over 27 miles of track within the dockyard. Its use declined in the 1970s: the link to the mainline was closed in 1977 and locomotives ceased operating within the yard the following year.

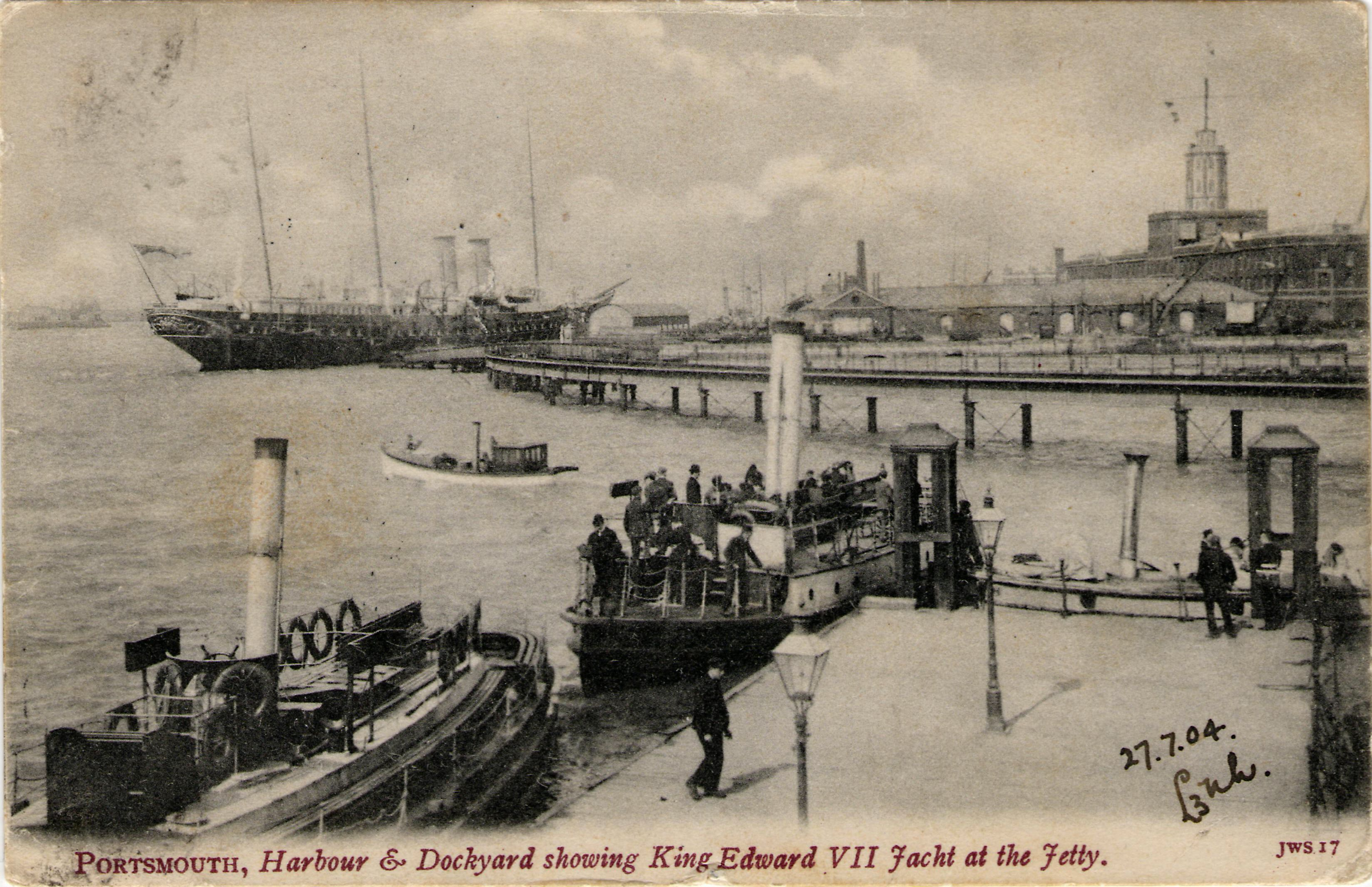
Railway viaduct leading to the South Railway Jetty (where HMY Victoria and Albert is moored) in 1904.

In 1876 a railway station was built on what became known as South Railway Jetty on Watering Island (west of the Semaphore Tower). It was served by a separate branch line which crossed the South Camber by way of a swing bridge and continued on a viaduct over the foreshore, joining the main line just east of Portsmouth Harbour railway station.

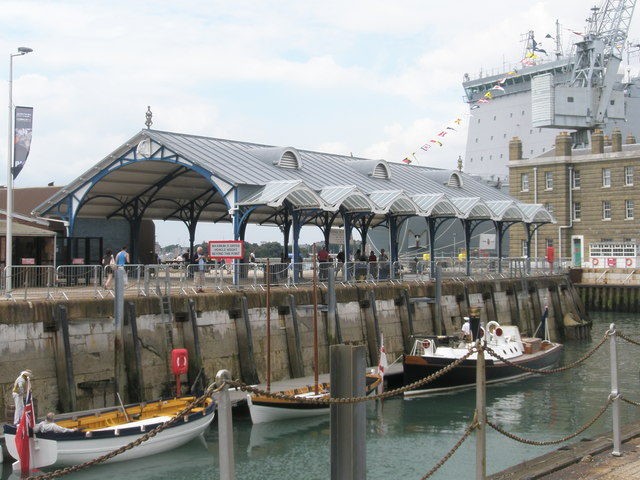
Relocated railway shelter (1888).

A small railway station and ornamental cast-iron shelter served in particular the needs of Queen Victoria and her family, who would often transfer from yacht to train at this location; this line soon became the main arrival/departure route for personnel. The swing bridge and viaduct were damaged in the wartime blitz and subsequently dismantled in 1946. The Royal Naval Railway Shelter has recently been moved to the other side of the island and restored.

=== Twentieth century ===
By the end of the 19th century, No 5 Slip had been uncovered and extended (to a length of 666 feet (203 m)) to become the yard's principal shipbuilding slip. At the same time the adjacent dry dock (No 9) was filled in to provide space for stacking steel plates, alongside which a further smithery (No 3 Engine Smithery) was erected in 1903. Meanwhile, slips 1–4 were repurposed (being no longer large enough for warship construction). Before long Nos 4 and 3 had been filled in, and the space beneath their cast iron covers converted into a shipbuilding workshop (No 3 Ship Shop); the neighbouring No 2 Slip was used for hauling up torpedo boat destroyers for a time, while No 1 was used as a boat slip.

In 1900 the Third class cruiser HMS Pandora was launched, followed by the armoured cruisers Kent in 1901 and Suffolk in 1903. Two battleships of the pre-Dreadnought King Edward VII Class were launched in 1904—Britannia and New Zealand.

==== Dreadnoughts ====
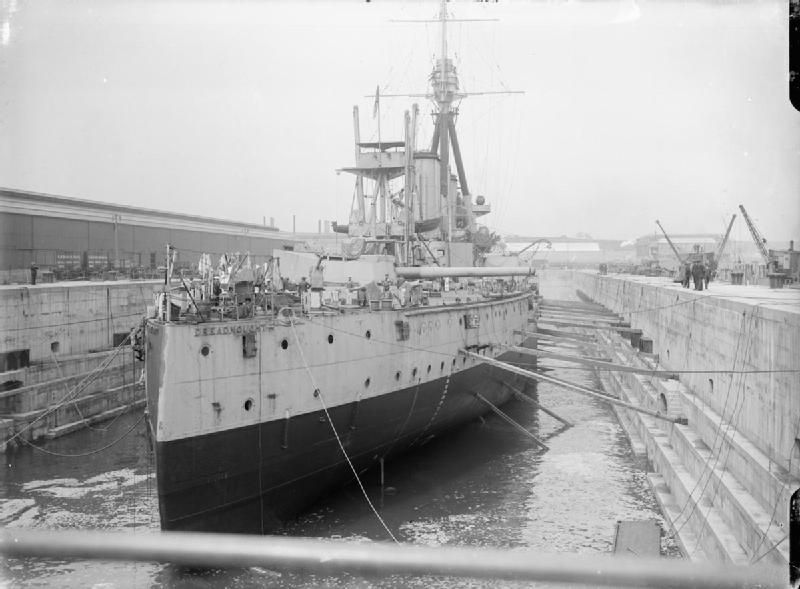
The era-defining HMS Dreadnought, back in Portsmouth for a refit in 1916.

The first modern battleship, Dreadnought, was built in 1905–06, taking one day more than a year. Further dreadnoughts followed—Bellerophon in 1907, St. Vincent in 1908, Orion in 1910, King George V in 1911, Iron Duke in 1912 and Queen Elizabeth in 1913.

Electrification came to the Yard with the opening of a 9,800 kW power station in 1906. At this time the 1846 Steam Factory still served as the dockyard's main heavy engineering complex, but the following year a very large New Steam Factory (to the east of No 12 dock) was opened. Equipped for the repair and maintenance of steam turbine propulsion units, it was soon put to the task of fitting out dreadnoughts. Nearby a new boiler shop had recently been built (south of No 13 dock), together with a new sawmill. Dry-docking provision was further increased in 1912 through the addition of an Admiralty Floating Dock, large enough to accommodate a dreadnought, which was moored just off Fountain Lake Jetty.

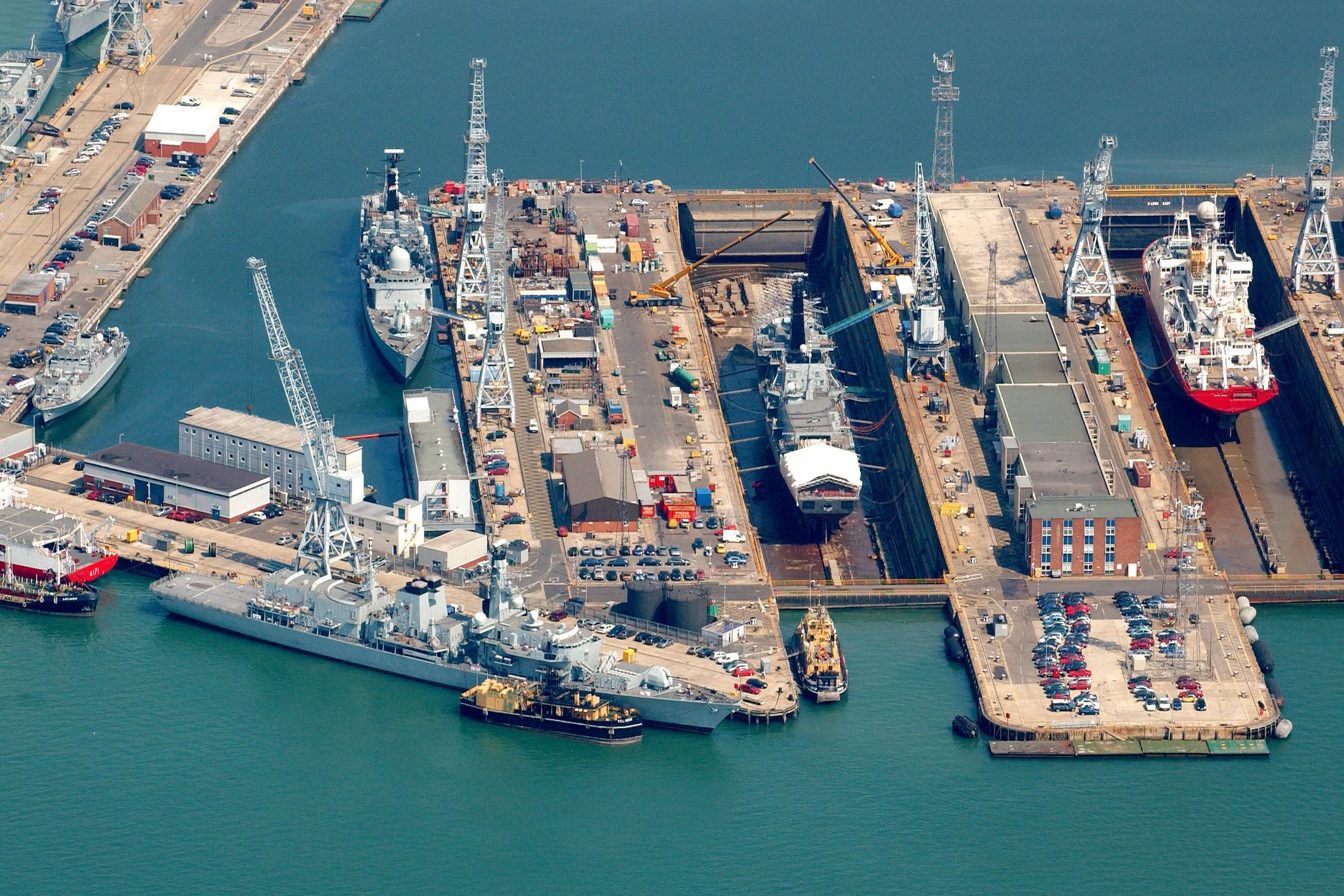
Northwest corner of No 3 Basin: the Pocket (left), D Lock (centre) and C Lock (right)

The largest Naval ships were now too large for the interlocking basins, so to guarantee access to the new dry docks the intervening walls between the basins were removed to create a single large non-tidal body of water (No 3 Basin), with a pair of 850 ft entrance locks being built at the same time. These (C & D locks) were operational from 1914, and they, together with the enlarged basin and docks, have remained in use, largely unaltered, ever since. On 8 April 1913, Portsmouth Dockyard opened the first of two new large 850 ft long drydock locks directly connecting Portsmouth Harbour to No.3 Basin, the first named 'C' Lock. A year later, 'D' Lock was opened in April 1914.

In one of the more serious suffragette attacks that happened before the First World War, a fire was purposely started at the dockyard on 20 December 1913, in which two men were killed after it spread through the industrial area. In the midst of the firestorm, the battlecruiser Queen Mary, had to be towed to safety to avoid the flames.

==== First World War ====
The largest vessel launched at Portsmouth during World War I was the 27,500-ton battleship Royal Sovereign in 1915. The only other launchings during the war were the submarines J1 and J2 in 1915, and K1, K2 and K5 in 1916. Some 1,200 vessels, however, underwent a refit at Portsmouth during the course of the War, and over the same period 1,658 ships were either hauled up the slipways or placed in dry-dock for repairs.

For the duration of the war significant numbers of women were employed in the yard, including in the erstwhile male domains of the Engineering Department, the Electrical Department and the Constructive Department. By the end of the war a total of 2,122 women were employed; 280 worked as clerks, the rest were manual workers.

==== Inter-war years ====
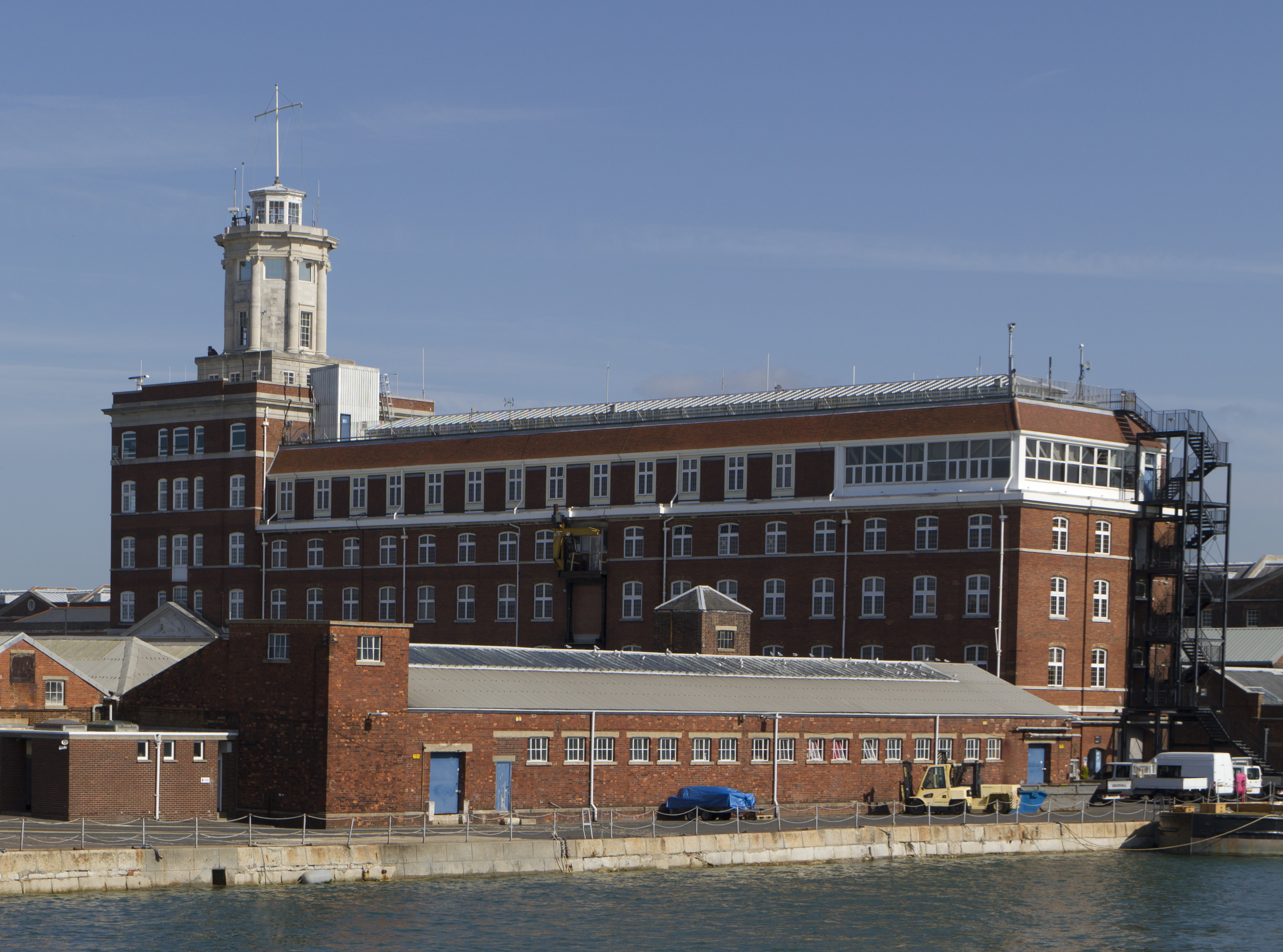
The rebuilt Semaphore Tower and adjacent office block (1923–29). The single-storey building in front, dating from 1847, was used for the storage, maintenance and hydraulic testing of chains and cables.

The period after the war was inevitably a time of contraction at the Dockyard, and there were many redundancies. In accordance with the Government's Ten Year Rule the Dockyard worked over the next decade and a half with a presumption of enduring peace rather than future conflict.

The majority of warships launched at Portsmouth following the end of the War were cruisers—Effingham in 1921, Suffolk in 1926, London in 1927, Dorsetshire in 1929, Neptune in 1933, and Amphion and Aurora in 1934. There were also four destroyers—Comet and her sister Crusader in 1931, and the flotilla leaders Duncan in 1932 and Exmouth in 1934. The only other vessels launched between the wars were the mining tenders Nightingale in 1931 and Skylark in 1932.

In 1922 HMS Victory was brought into No 2 Dry Dock (where she remains to this day). She was opened to the public on 17 July 1928, and ten years later a museum building (the Victory Gallery) was opened nearby to house works of art and other items related to the ship (including W L Wyllie's Panorama of the Battle of Trafalgar).

New Dockyard facilities in this period included a Steel Foundry, built in 1926, and the Central Metallurgical Laboratory, established ten years later. The "Semaphore Tower" was opened in 1930, a facsimile of its namesake (dating from 1810–24) which had been destroyed in a fire in 1913. The arch beneath incorporates the Lion Gate, once part of the 18th-century fortifications. The original Semaphore Tower had been erected between a sizeable pair of buildings: the Rigging Store and Sail Loft (both of 1784), which perished in the same fire; in the end only one of the pair was rebuilt, as a five-storey office block. In 1937 work began on a new boathouse (No 4 Boathouse), which replaced the last working masthouse of the yard (in place there since c.1700). Construction was halted by the start of the Second World War, and the southern half of the new building was never completed; during the war it was fully occupied with building landing craft, small boats and midget submarines.

==== Second World War ====
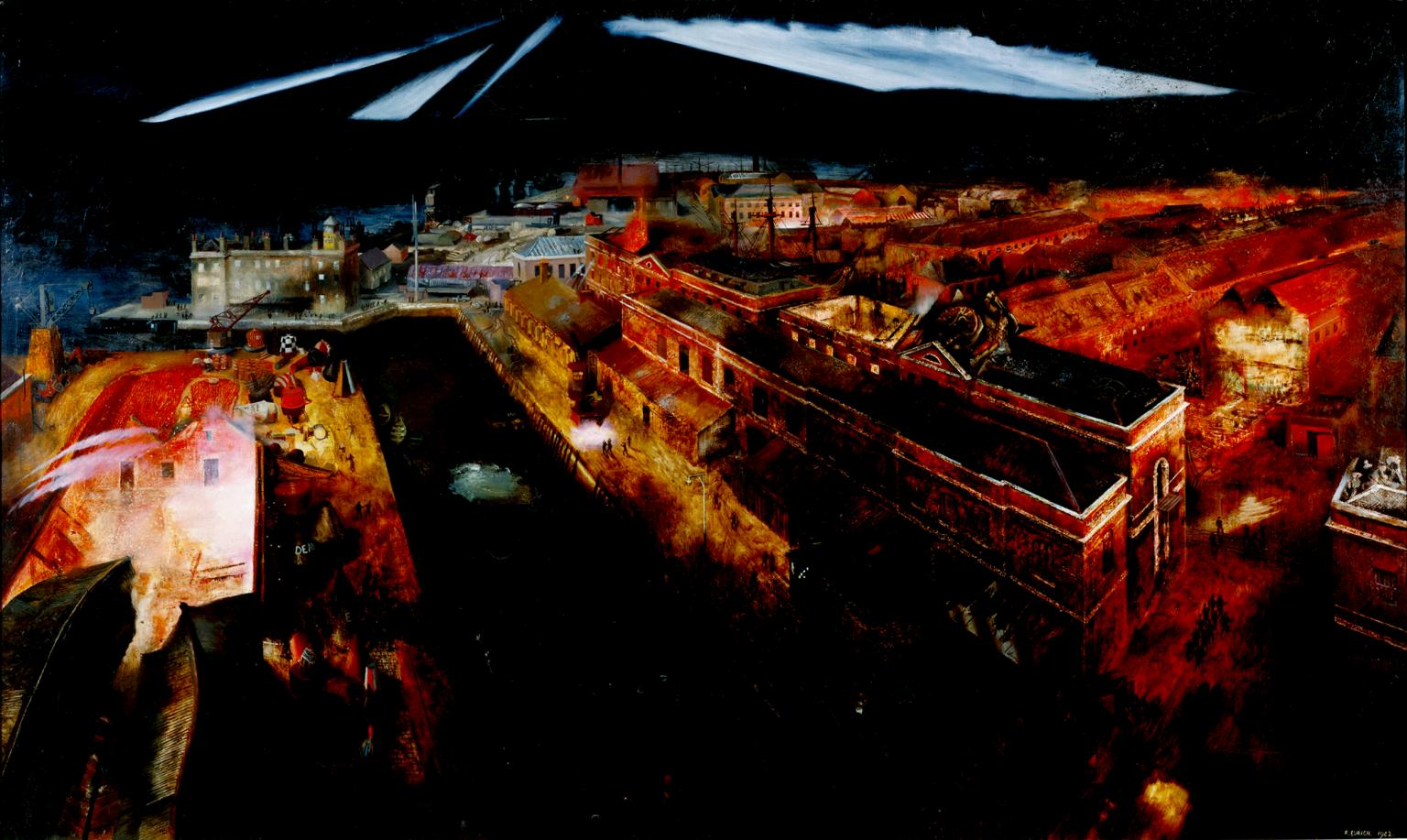
Night Raid on Portsmouth Docks, 1941: oil painting by Richard Eurich (looking north from the Semaphore Tower).

The destroyer flotillas (the capital ships having been evacuated to Scapa Flow), were essential to the defence of the English Channel, particularly during Operation Dynamo (the Dunkirk evacuation) and against any potential German Invasion. The base itself served a major refit and repair role. The Germans realised this importance and the city and base in particular was heavily bombed.

Portsmouth and the Naval Base itself were the headquarters and main departure point for the military and naval units destined for Sword Beach on the Normandy coast as a part of Operation Overlord and the D-Day landings on 6 June 1944. Troops destined for each of the landing beaches left from Portsmouth aboard vessels such as the armed merchant cruisers HMCS Prince Henry and HMCS Prince David, escorted by the Canadian destroyers HMCS Algonquin and Sioux. The majority of the naval support for the operation left from Portsmouth, including the Mulberry Harbours. Boathouse 4 (built around the start of hostilities) contributed to the construction of landing craft and support vessels as well as more specialised craft such as midget submarines.

==== Post Second World War ====
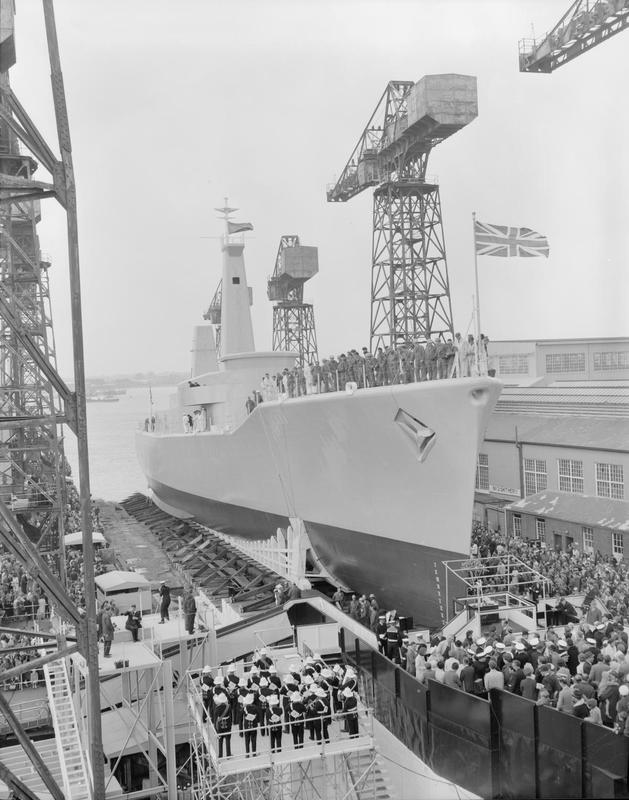
No 5 Slip in 1967: the launch of HMS Andromeda the last ship to be built in Portsmouth's Dockyard.

There was much rebuilding, demolition and consolidation of bomb-damaged buildings in the aftermath of the Second World War. At the same time, a number of returning ships were refitted in the yard (while others were de-equipped, ready for scrapping). The Dockyard was kept busy with refitting and modernisation works through the 1950s and 60s. Private yards were used to a greater extent for shipbuilding, but five new frigates were launched at Portsmouth in this time. Numbers employed in the dockyard remained steadily above 16,000 through the 1950s and early '60s; but a Defence Review published in 1966 signalled a significant reduction in the size of the fleet and a parallel downsizing of workforces in the Royal Dockyards.

In the decade that followed No 5 shipbuilding slip was taken out of commission; it was infilled (along with the other remaining slips at the north corner) and the adjacent buildings were demolished. Nevertheless, elsewhere in the yard a number of new workshops and other facilities were built in the 1970s, especially around Nos 12–15 docks (including a large Heavy Plate Shop, now the Steel Production Hall, built on the site of the Edwardian Boiler Shop).

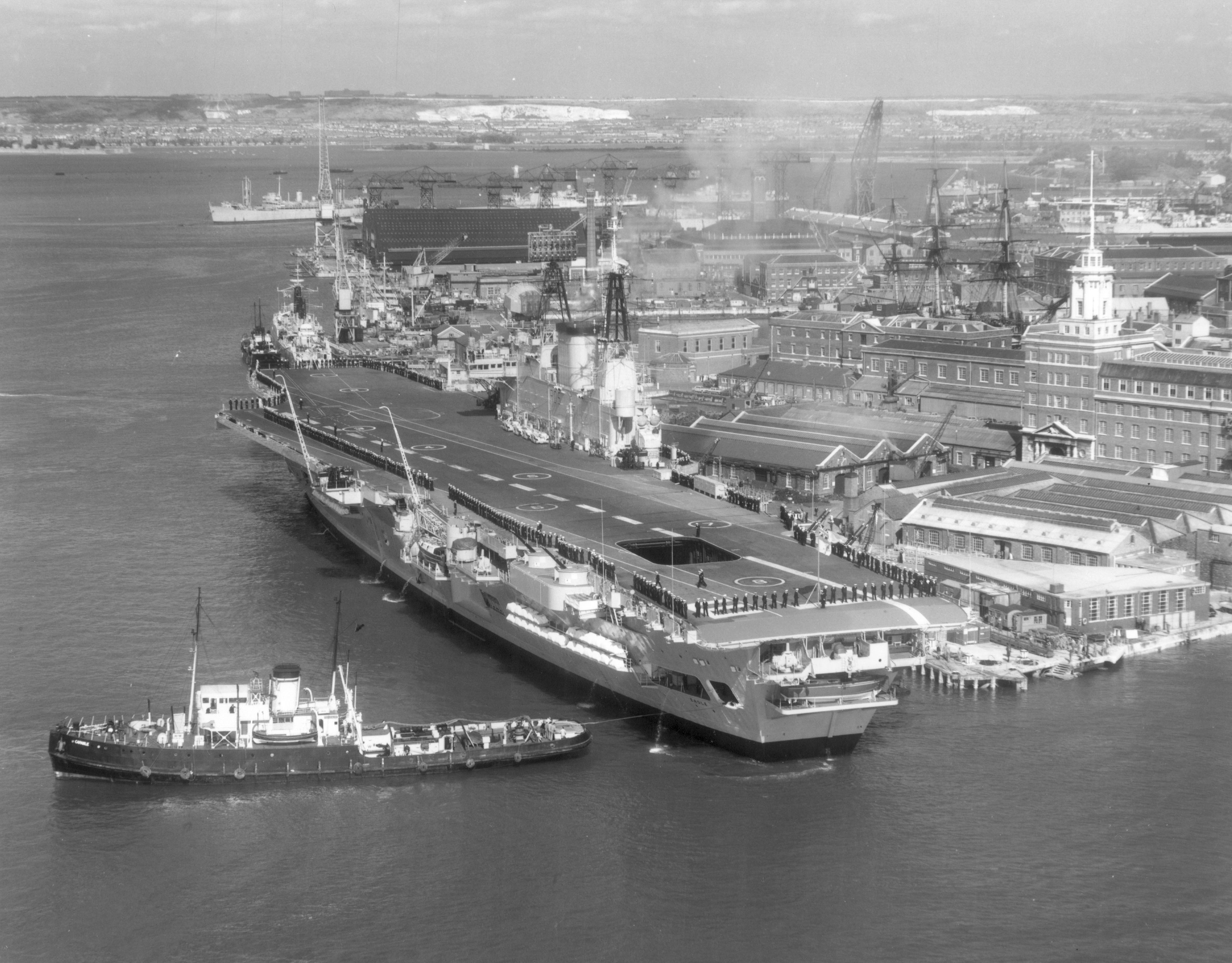
HM Dockyard, Portsmouth in the 1960s. Foreground: HMS Eagle; the covered slips and hammerhead cranes beyond were demolished in the 1980s.

In June 1981, however, the government announced that shipbuilding would cease at Portsmouth, that the workforce would be reduced from just under 7,000 to 1,225 and that the erstwhile Royal Dockyard would become a Fleet Maintenance & Repair Organisation (FMRO) with a minor support and repair role (Devonport and Rosyth would take over major refits and ship modernisation work). The run-down of the Dockyard was put on hold, however, at the start of the Falklands Conflict, with all available hands being put to the task of preparing the Falklands Task Force.

===== Falklands Task Force =====
In 1982 Argentina invaded the Falkland Islands. In response a task force of British military and merchant ships was dispatched from Portsmouth Naval Base to the islands in the South Atlantic to reclaim them for the United Kingdom.

The task force consisted of the following ships:

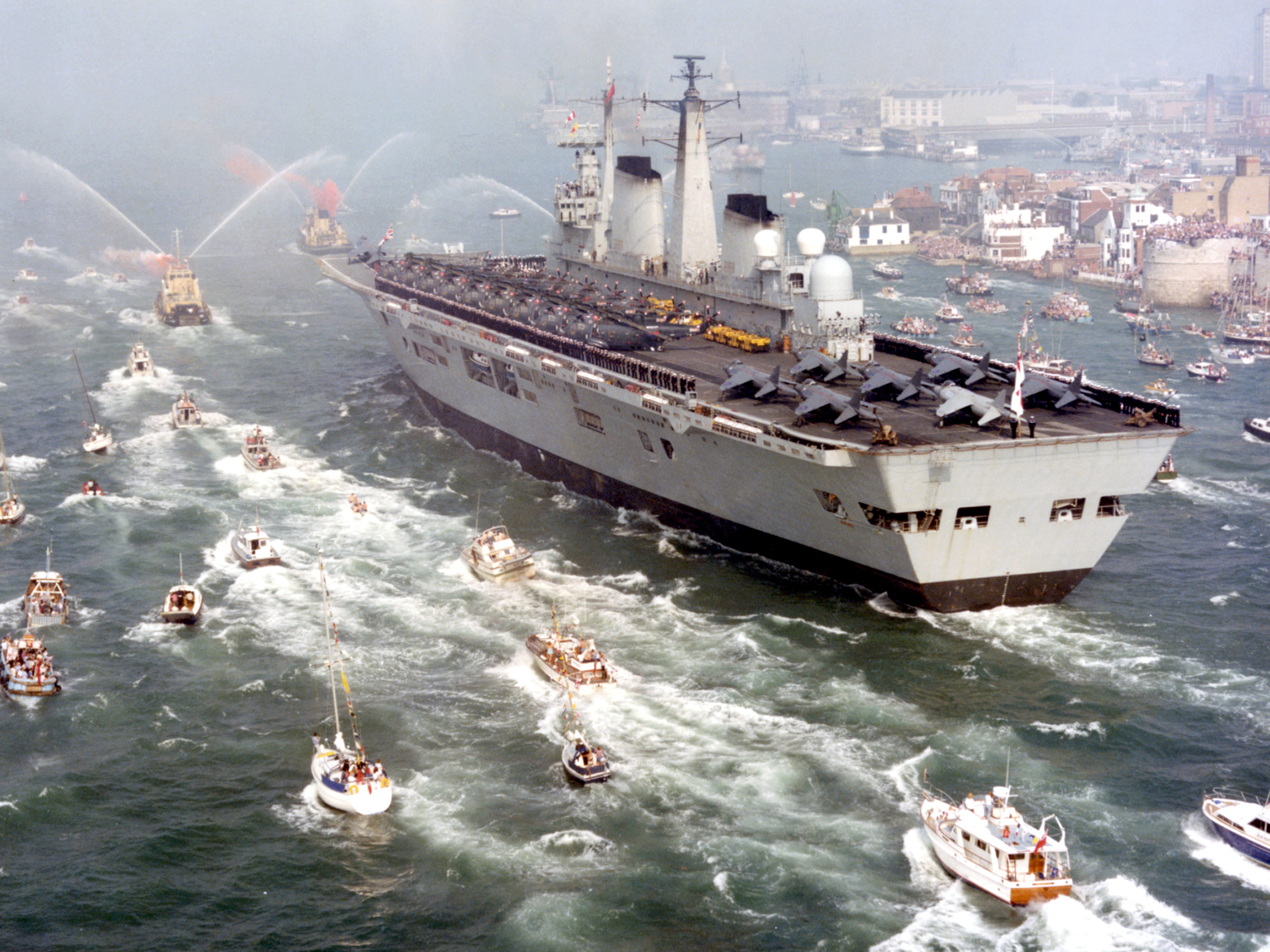
HMS Invincible arriving back at HMNB Portsmouth from the Falklands.

- Two aircraft carriers
- Two landing ship docks
- Eight destroyers
- Fifteen frigates
- Three patrol ships
- Five submarines
- Three survey vessels
- Five minesweepers
- Ten fleet tankers
- Six logistic landing ships
- Five supply ships
- One helicopter supply ship
- Eighteen merchant ships including troop/cruise ships such as Queen Elizabeth 2 and SS Canberra

Following some losses, the majority of these ships returned to Portsmouth later that year.

===== Rundown of the Dockyard =====
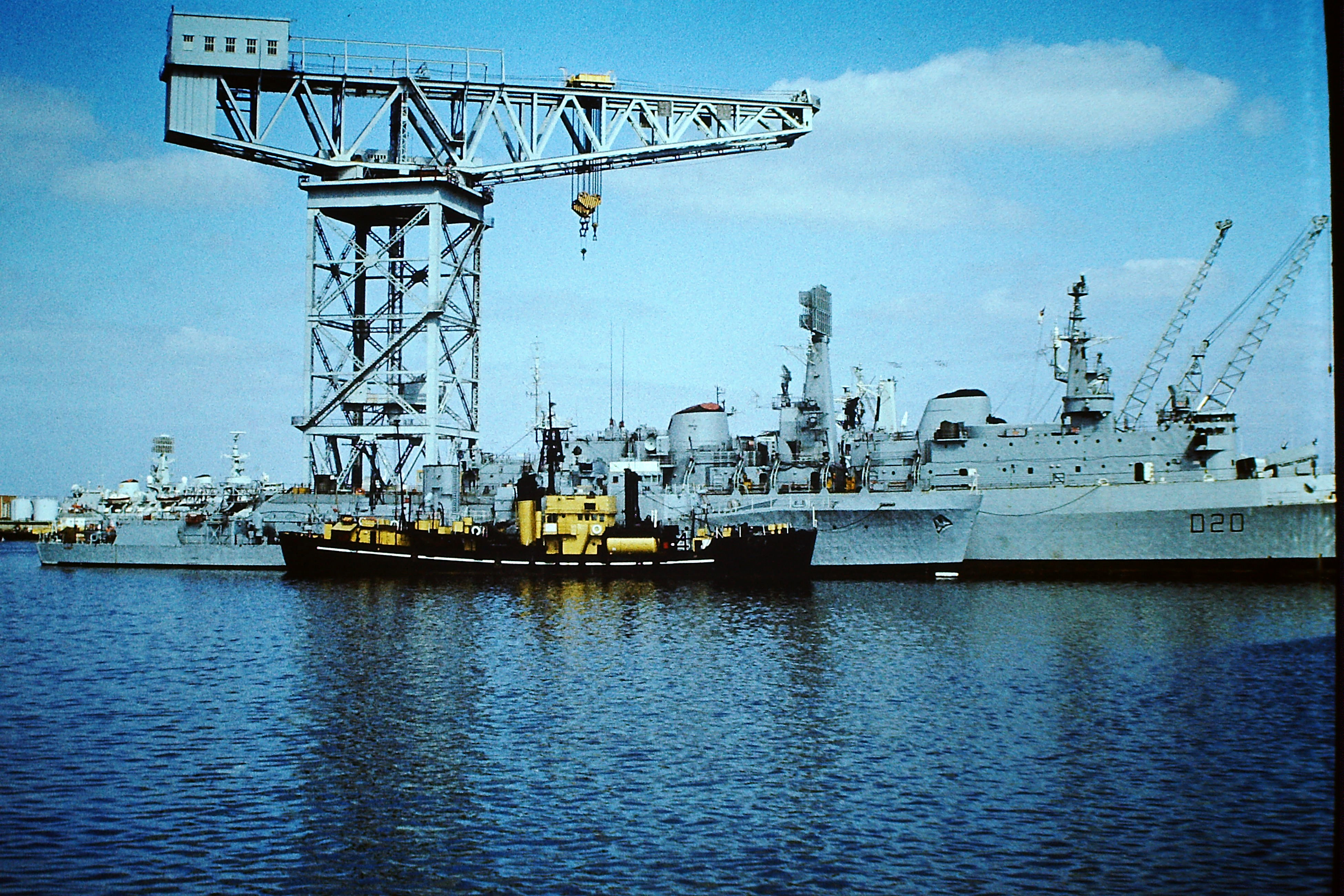
1980: Various craft alongside a 1912 Arrol 250-ton electric hammerhead crane (demolished 1984).

Thereafter, some of the cuts that had been proposed in the 1981 Defence White Paper were reversed. The retention of a larger fleet meant that a larger workforce was retained at Portsmouth than had been envisaged (around 2,800); however the run-down of the old Dockyard went ahead, with dry docks 1–7 being closed, just under half the dockside cranes demolished and ten out of the nineteen major workshops on the site taken out of service. The dockyard's 'Edwardian piece de résistance', the Great Factory of 1905, ceased manufacturing in 1986 and was converted to serve as a warehouse (at the end of the century it was linked by monorail to other nearby buildings to create a large Central Storage and Distribution Facility).

In the older parts of the dockyard several buildings, ranging from storehouses to foundries, were converted for office use; this trend continued in later years. Similarly, the Great Steam Smithery (1852) adjoining the Steam Factory (aka No 2 Ship Shop) underwent conversion in 1993 to provide squash courts, offices, messrooms and a self-service laundry. In the same year, Victory Building, a new neo-Georgian office block, was opened on a prominent site facing the historic No 1 basin (just one of several new office blocks built across the dockyard site in each decade of the second half of the century); it accommodated staff of the Second Sea Lord, relocated there from London.

In 1998 the work of the FMRO was contracted out to the private sector in the shape of Fleet Support Limited.

=== Twenty-first century ===
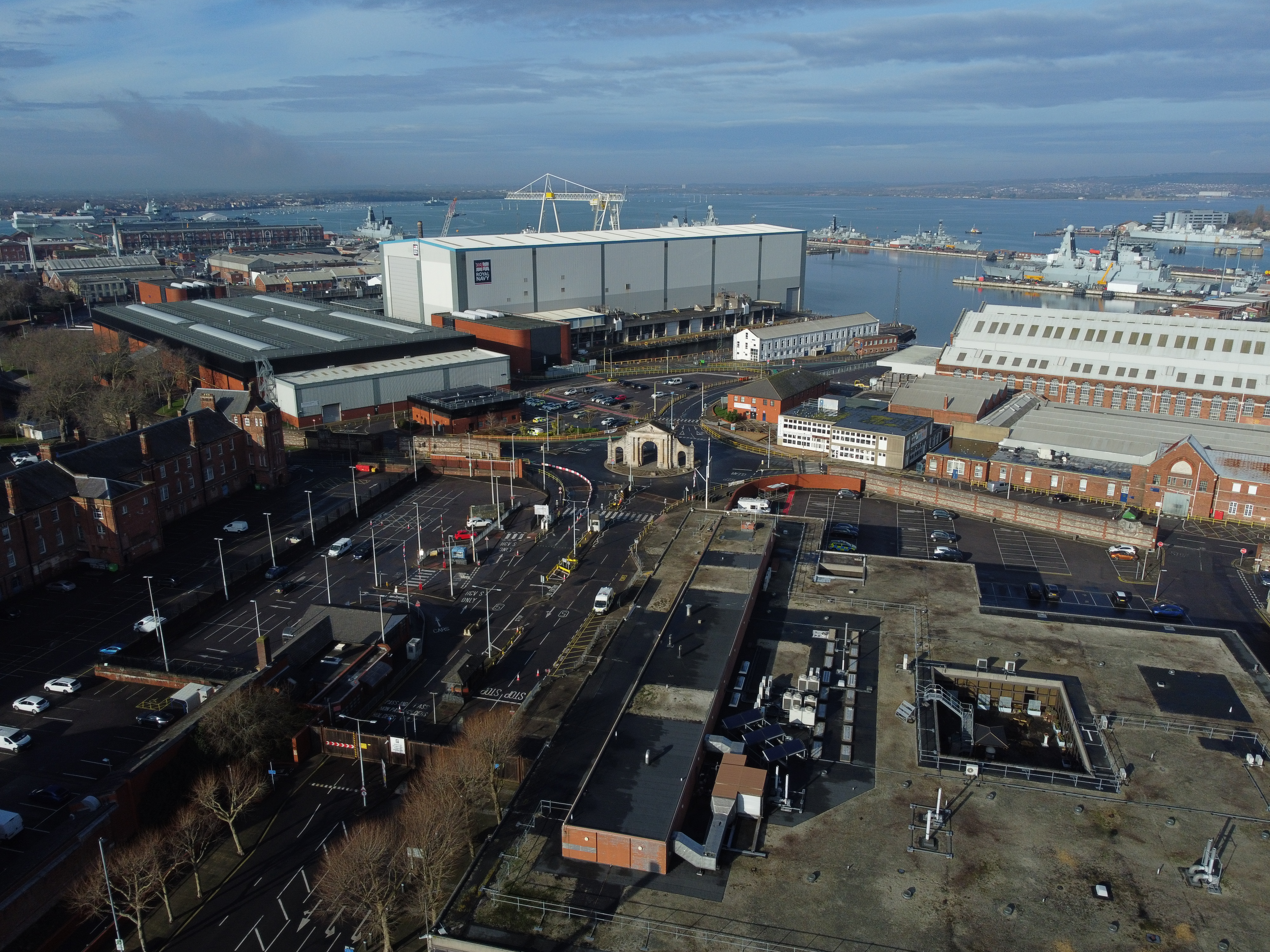
HMNB Portsmouth in 2022. In the centre is Unicorn Gate (originally part of the 18th-century fortifications), and beyond it Ship Hall B (2003); to the left is the Steel Production Hall (1975), to the right the old Torpedo Depôt (1886) and Great Factory (1903).

In the summer of 2005 Portsmouth Naval Base and the Solent played host to two special events organised as part of the Trafalgar 200 commemorations recognising the 200th Anniversary of the Battle of Trafalgar. These were the International Fleet Review and the International Festival of the Sea.

In 2007 it was reckoned that the Royal Navy/MOD directly employed 9,774 people at Portsmouth, of whom 5,680 were ships' crew and the rest either service personnel or civilian employees working in the naval base. In addition, there were 3,834 private-sector employees on the base, including defence contractors, sub-contractors and heritage-related workers.

==== Shipbuilding, maintenance and repair ====
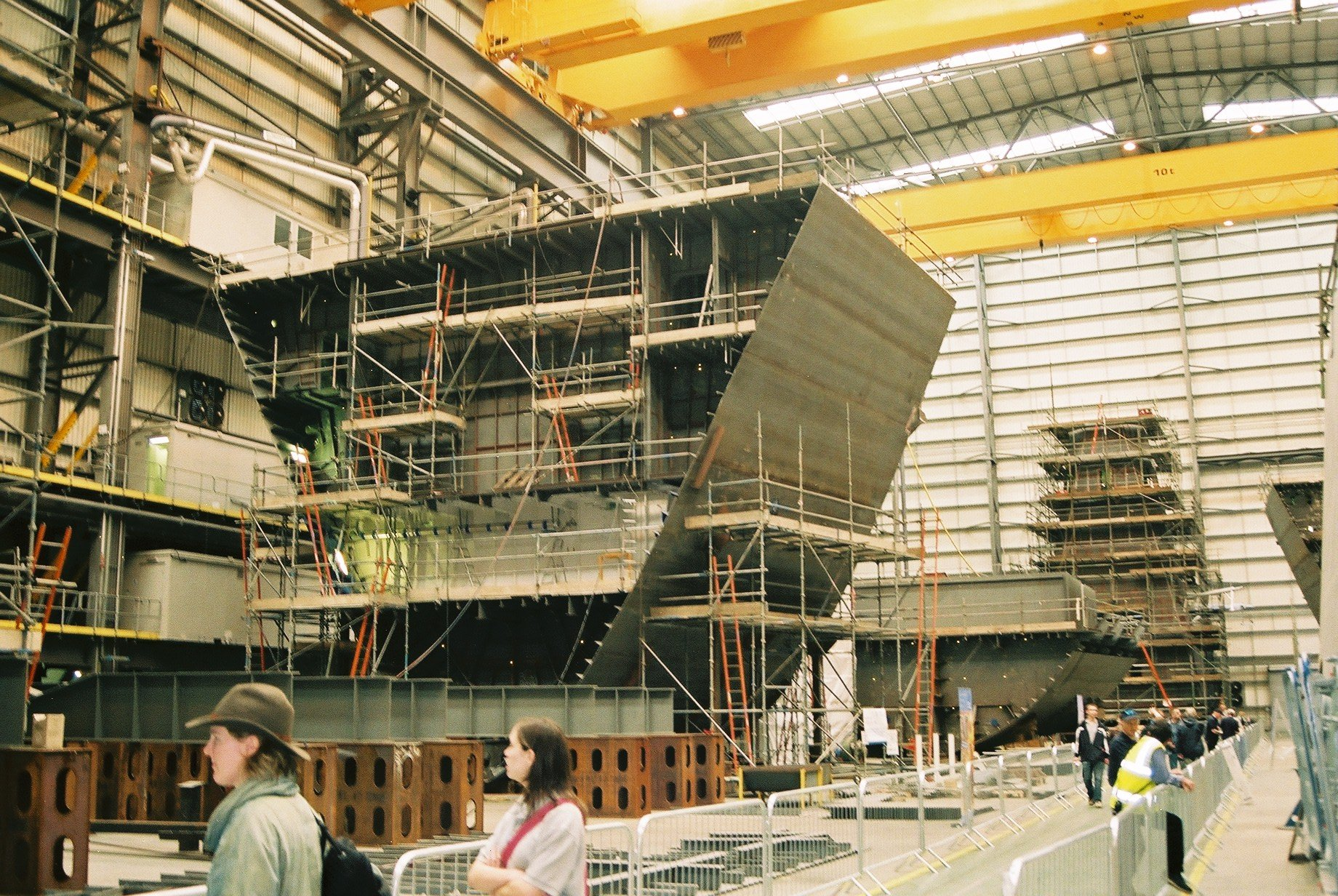
Parts of HMS Dauntless under construction in VT Shipbuilding's Portsmouth facility

Shipbuilding recommenced on the site in 2003 following the construction of a facility by VT Group on the site of No. 13 dry dock (having relocated there from the old Thornycroft Yard in Woolston, Southampton). Modular construction of warships took place in an interlinked complex of large buildings: the Steelwork Production Hall, the Unit Construction Hall and the Ship Assembly Hall. Construction of modules for the Type 45 destroyers and Queen Elizabeth-class aircraft carriers took place here, latterly under BAE Systems Maritime – Naval Ships. The project was intended to secure the base's future for the next forty years and revitalise shipbuilding in the city; but in 2013 it was announced that, due to budget cuts, the shipbuilding facility in Portsmouth would close in favour of BAE keeping its yards in Glasgow open. (There was speculation at the time that this was to help retain Scotland in the union during the 2014 Scottish independence referendum.)

BAE Systems, having subsumed Fleet Support Ltd, continues to manage ship repair and maintenance facilities around No. 3 Basin at Portsmouth. As of 2016 the former shipbuilding complex was being used for repairing minehunters and other small craft.

==== New aircraft carriers ====
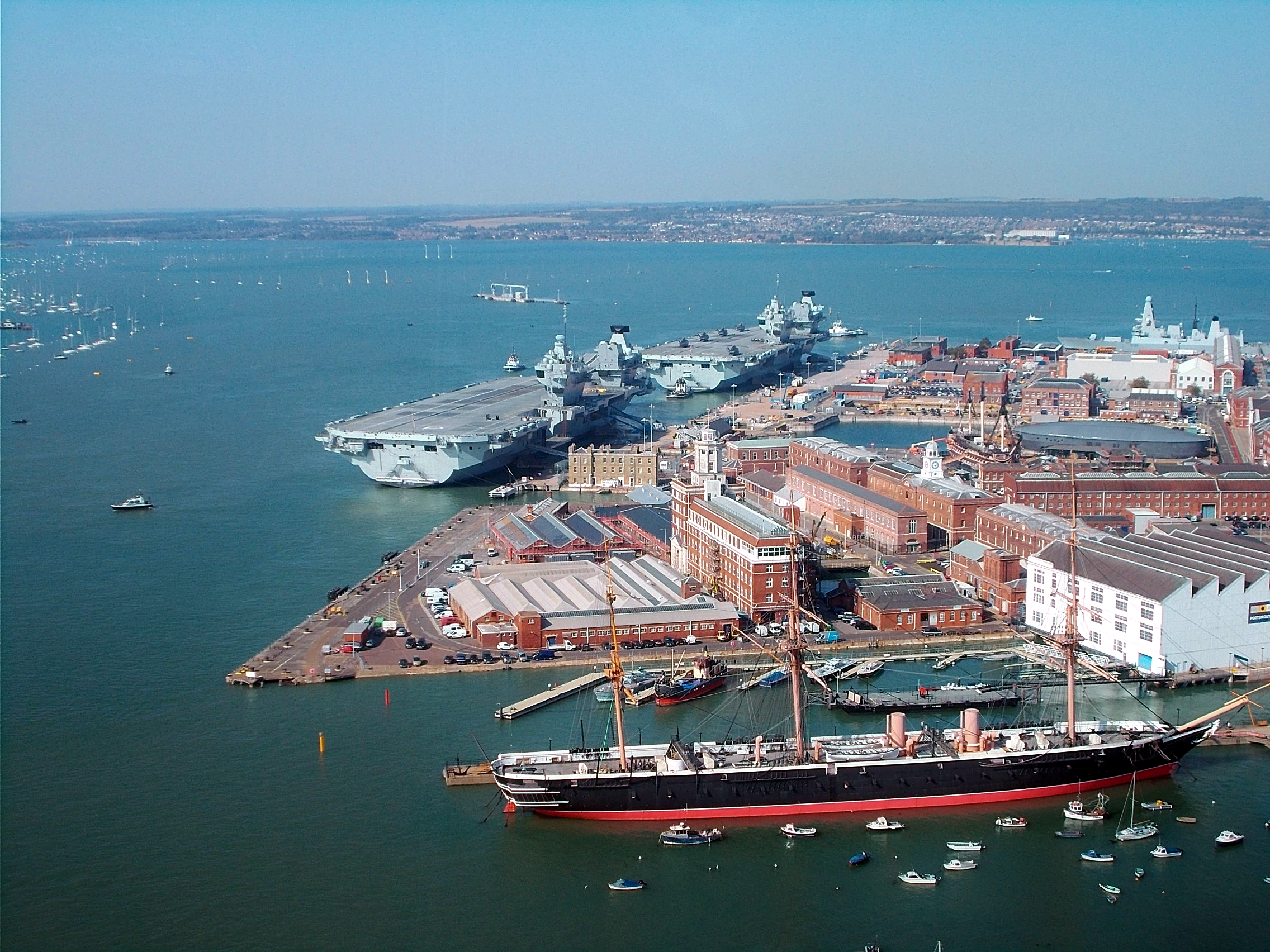
Aircraft carriers HMS Prince of Wales and HMS Queen Elizabeth berthed together at Portsmouth in 2020. In the foreground is the historic ship HMS Warrior.

In 2013 a £100 million upgrade of the naval base facilities and harbour was begun, in preparation for the arrival of the two Queen Elizabeth-class aircraft carriers (Portsmouth having been chosen to serve as their home base). These ships required the harbour to be dredged to allow safe entry and exit. Victory Jetty and the Middle Slip Jetty were strengthened and upgraded (the latter being renamed Princess Royal Jetty on completion of the works), so as to enable both carriers to lay alongside at the same time. HMS Queen Elizabeth arrived in Portsmouth in 2017, and HMS Prince of Wales followed two years later.

== Civil and military administration of the Dockyard ==
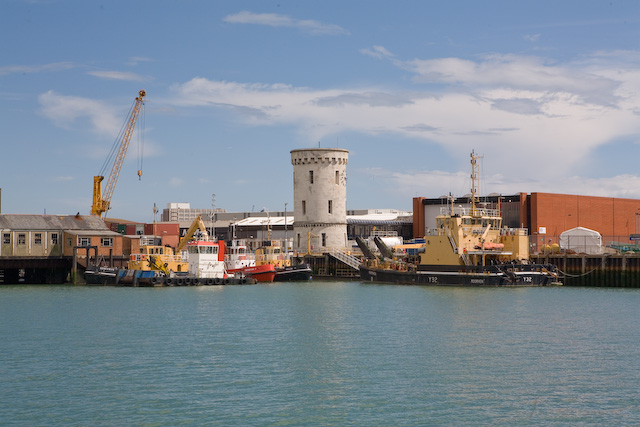
Once part of a 19th-century gun battery, the round tower now forms an entrance for the adjacent 1979 office, store & workshop by Ove Arup (right).

From 1546 until 1832 prime responsibility for administering H.M. Royal Navy Dockyards lay with the Navy Board, and resident commissioners who were naval officers though civilian employees of the Navy Board, not sea officers in charge of the day-to-day operational running of the dockyard and superintendence of its staff, following the abolition of that board its functions were merged within the Admiralty and a new post styled Admiral-superintendent was established the admiral-superintendent usually held the rank of rear-admiral though sometimes vice-admiral. His immediate subordinate was an officer known as the captain of the dockyard (or captain of the port from 1969). This followed the appointment of a (civilian) Chief Executive of the Royal Dockyards in September 1969 and the creation of a centralised Royal Dockyards Management Board. Admiral-superintendents ceased to be appointed in the royal navy after 15 September 1971, and existing post-holders were renamed port admirals. In May 1971 the post was renamed Flag Officer, Portsmouth and Admiral Superintendent until July 1971 when it was renamed Flag Officer, Spithead and Port Admiral until August 1975, the post name was changed again to Flag Officer, Portsmouth and Port Admiral until October 1996 when it ceased to exist as a separate command that was then absorbed into the First Flotilla Command later renamed Portsmouth Flotilla.

== Associated establishments in the Portsmouth area ==
The presence of the Dockyard and Fleet led to the establishment of a variety of other naval and military installations in and around Portsmouth over the years, some of which are listed below.

=== Naval ===
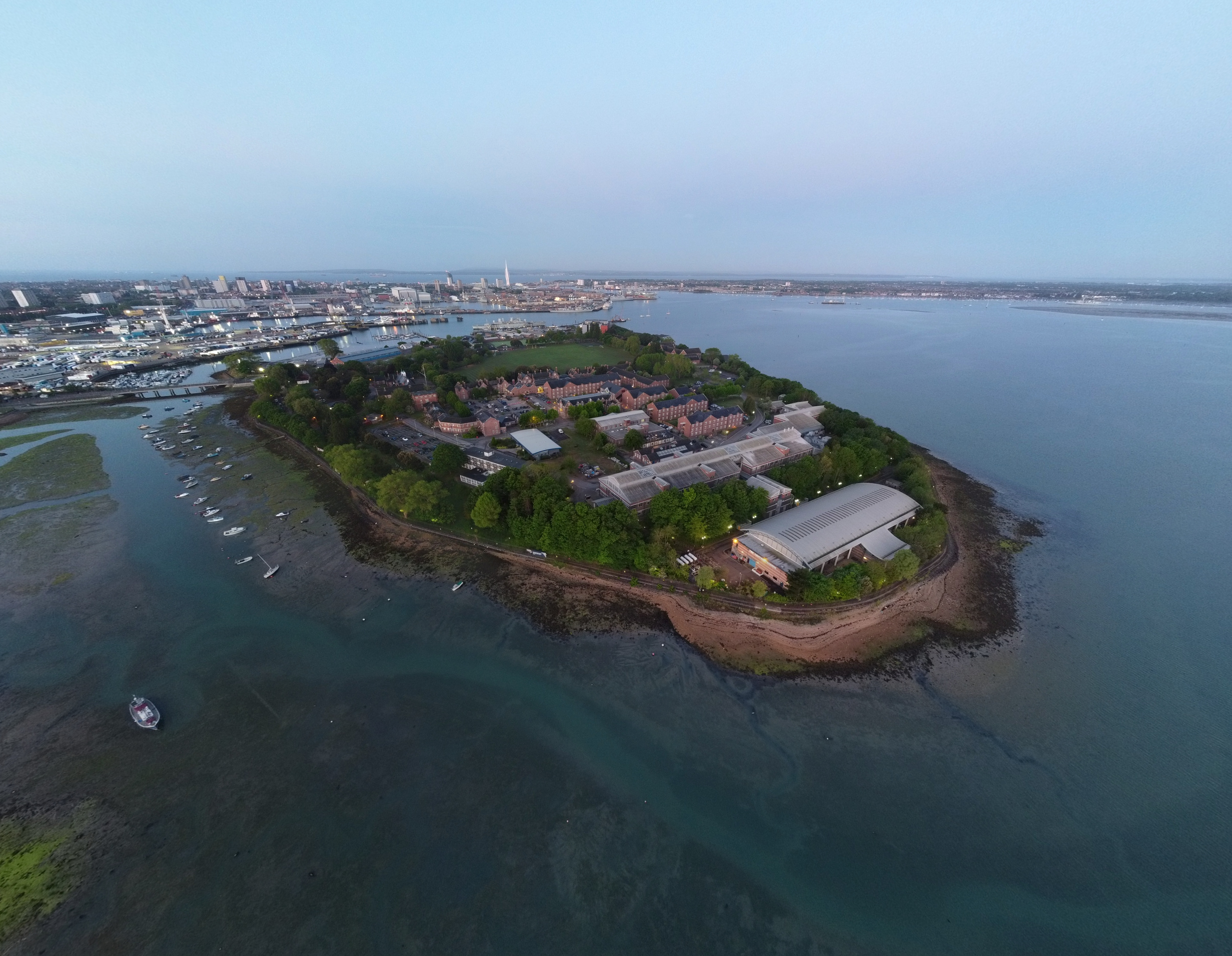
HMS Excellent on Whale Island.

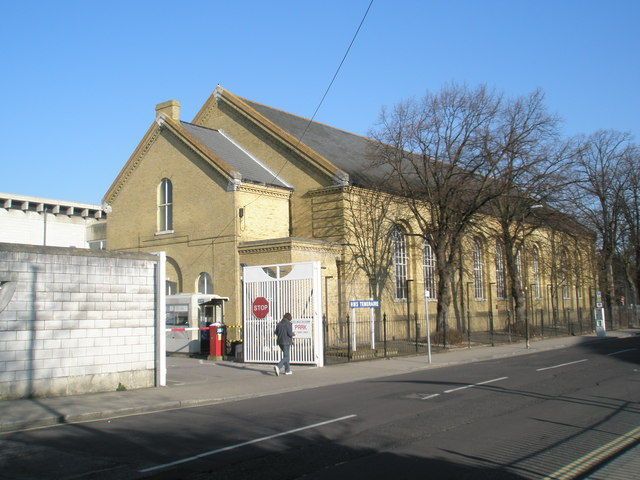
Gateway and Old Gymnasium, HMS Temeraire

- HMS King Alfred: A Royal Naval Reserve unit located in the renovated "Semaphore Tower".
- HMS Excellent: Whale Island, Portsmouth (includes Navy Command Headquarters together with a front-line Naval Training establishment operated by Babcock International (with all catering, front of house, cleaning and hotel services sub-contracted to Compass Group plc)). The name was formerly attached to the barracks and other facilities of the RN Gunnery Establishment (based on the island from 1891 to 1985); these now form part of the training base.
- HMS Temeraire: Burnaby Road, Portsmouth. Training of Naval Physical Training Instructors and sports grounds and facilities for Portsmouth-based personnel. RN School of Physical Training has been known as Temeraire since 1971, and moved to its current site in 1988.
- HMS Collingwood: Fareham. Naval training provided mainly under contract to Babcock International (catering and cleaning services are sub-contracted to Sodexo). Commissioned in 1940 as a training establishment for 'new entry' seamen, it later housed the RN School of Electrical Engineering, but serves today as headquarters of the Maritime Warfare School.
- HMS Nelson: Portsmouth. Naval barracks.
- HMS Sultan: Gosport. Naval (and tri-service) training, home of the centre of excellence for mechanical and electrical engineering. Naval training provided mainly under contract to Babcock International (catering and cleaning services are sub-contracted to Sodexo); opened on this site in 1956.
- Institute of Naval Medicine, Gosport.
- Marchwood Military Port, Southampton Water. Royal Fleet Auxiliary base-port.

==== Decommissioned ====
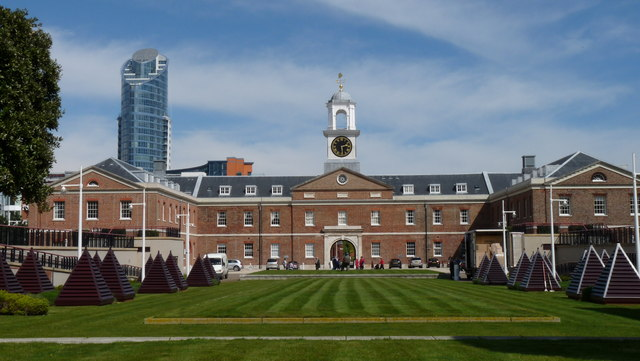
Former Ordnance Storehouse (Vulcan building) Gunwharf Quays

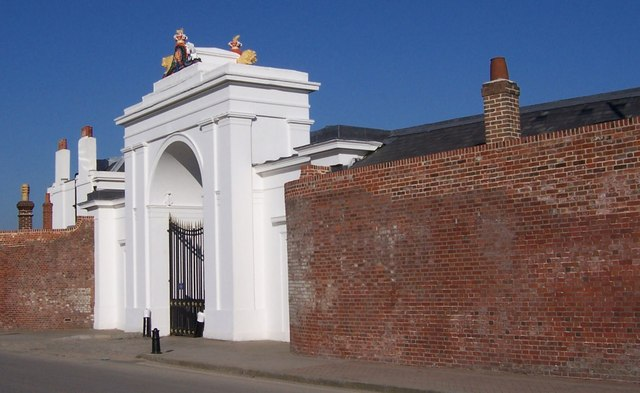
Entrance to the former Royal Clarence Victualling Yard (est. 1827)

- HMS Dryad: Now MOD Southwick Park—Tri-Service Defence School of Policing and Guarding
- HMS Dolphin diesel electric submarine base—Now MOD Fort Blockhouse
- HM Gun Wharf, later HMS Vernon torpedo and mines establishment – Now in civilian use as Gunwharf Quays
- HMS Daedalus Fleet Air Arm base
- Royal Naval Hospital, Haslar
- Eastney Barracks (Royal Marine Artillery barracks 1867–1923, Royal Marines barracks 1923–1995) — converted into housing.
- Forton Barracks (Royal Marine Light Infantry barracks 1848–1923, then HMS St Vincent boys' training establishment until 1968) — Now in civilian use as St Vincent College
- Royal Clarence Victualling Yard, Gosport
- RNAD Gosport: A composite site which included:
  - RNAD Priddy's Hard (1776) gunpowder storage and shell-filling facility. Closed 1988 – now Explosion! Museum of Naval Firepower
  - RNAD Bedenham (1908) gunpowder stores were moved here from Priddy's Hard (judged to be dangerously close to the Dockyard).
  - RNAD Elson (now part of DM Gosport)
  - RNAD Frater (now part of DM Gosport)
- RNAD Marchwood (1811) closed 1961 – Converted for housing and use by Marchwood Yacht Club
- Haslar Gunboat Yard (opened 1859, closed 1973)
- HMS Mercury: RN Signals School 1941–1993, Leydene House, East Meon, near Portsmouth
- HMS Phoenix: Fire fighting training establishment 1946–1993, now part of HMS Excellent

=== Military ===
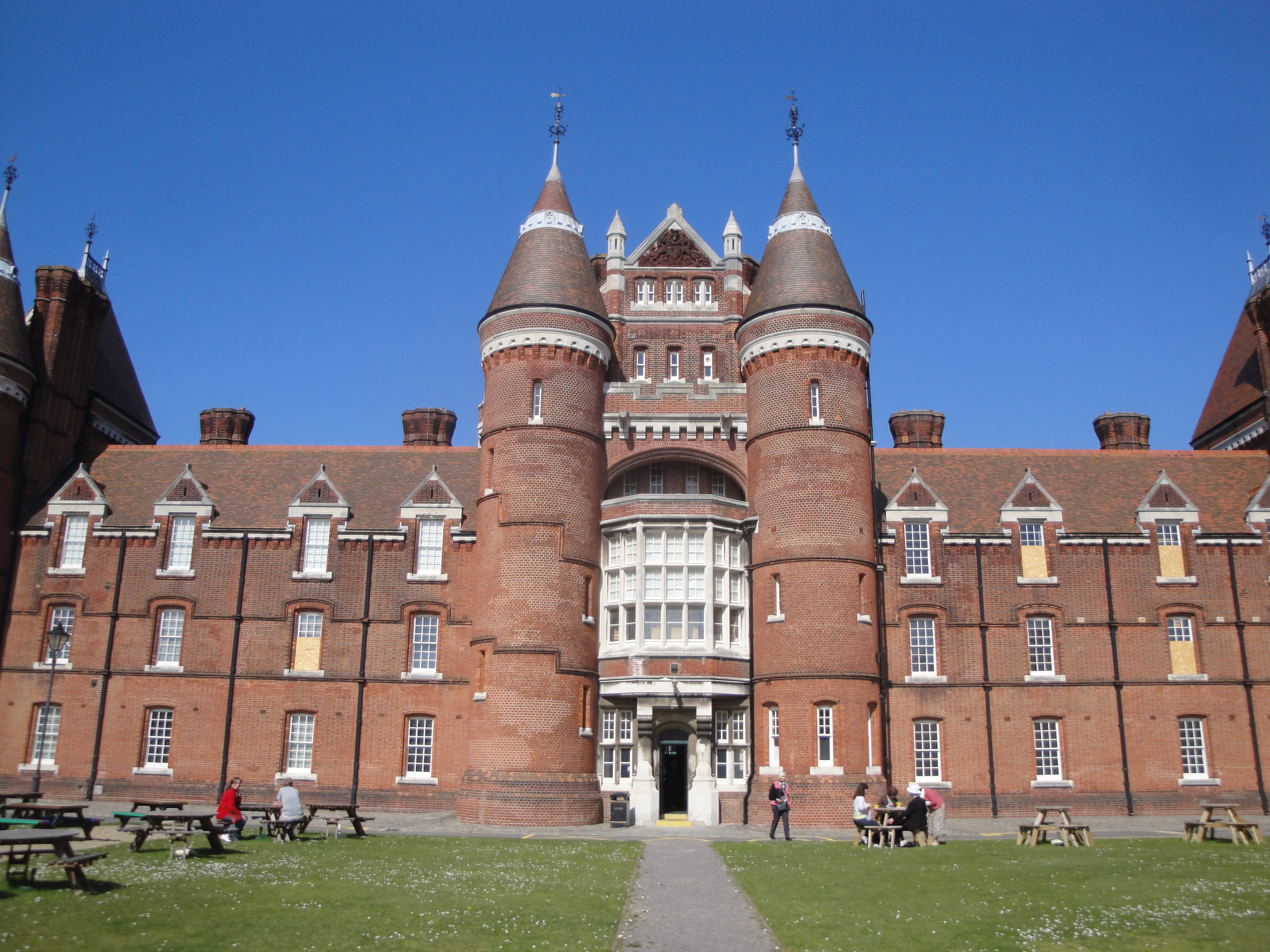
One of the few surviving parts of the once extensive Clarence and Victoria Barracks complex (now the home of Portsmouth City Museum).

The Fortifications of Portsmouth were developed over several centuries to protect the fleet and dockyard from attacks either by land or by sea. From 1665 Bernard de Gomme oversaw construction of defensive Lines around both Portsmouth (the Dockyard and the old town) and Gosport (on the opposite side of Portsmouth Harbour). These defences were extended in the 18th century, before being superseded in the 19th by the Palmerston forts which encircle Portsmouth on and off-shore.

Milldam Barracks block, c.1800

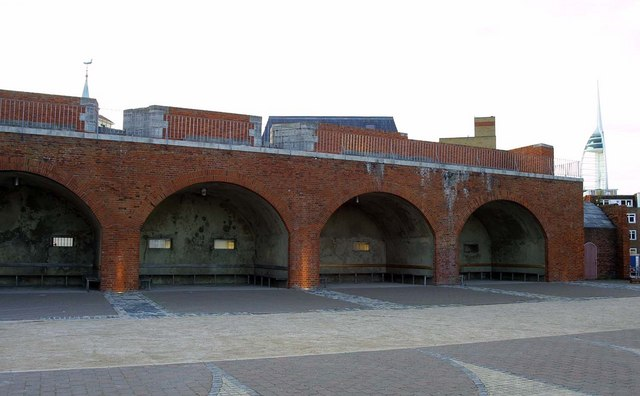
Remains of the Point Barracks

These fortifications required substantial numbers of personnel to man them and, from the mid-18th century onwards, they (together with other troops who were either stationed in the garrison or preparing to embark overseas) were accommodated in a variety of barracks in and around the city. By 1900 these included:

- Cambridge Barracks, High Street (Infantry) – established in 1825 in a set of late 18th-century warehouses; the officers' quarters have been occupied by Portsmouth Grammar School since 1926.
- Clarence Barracks (Royal Garrison Artillery) – established in 1760 as Fourhouse Barracks on land between St Nicholas Street and the fortifications (alongside an earlier Royal Marine Barracks); renamed in 1827; rebuilt around 1881, expanding across the old defensive lines into the field beyond; demolished c. 1967.
- Colewort Barracks, St George's Road (Army Service Corps) – built as a garrison hospital, converted to barracks 1694, demolished to make way for expansion of nearby power station in the 1920s.
- Hilsea Barracks (Royal Field Artillery) – built 1854, Royal Army Ordnance Corps from 1921; closed 1962, site redeveloped for housing (the surviving 18th-century Gatcombe House served as the officers' mess).
- Milldam Barracks (Royal Engineers) – built late 18th century onwards, housed the Engineers responsible for upkeep of the fortifications; sold in 1969 and now occupied by the University of Portsmouth and Portsmouth Register Office.
- Point Barracks (Artillery) – built alongside the medieval Round Tower in 1846–50; sold to Portsmouth City Council in the early 1960s following disbandment of the UK's Coastal Artillery network. Part of the brick structure was demolished, but is marked by stones in the ground alongside the surviving casemates.
- St George Barracks, Gosport (Infantry) – built 1856–59 as a transit barracks for troops, continuing in military use until 1991; several buildings remain, since converted to new uses.
- Victoria Barracks (Infantry) – built in 1888 alongside New Clarence Barracks; demolished 1967.

According to the census over 6,000 men were living in barracks in the Portsmouth area in 1911.

== Naval Base Commander (Portsmouth) ==
The head of HMNB Portsmouth is titled Naval Base Commander (Portsmouth).

- 1996–1998: Commodore I.R. Henderson CBE ADC
- 1998–2000: Commodore S.W. Graham OBE
- 2000–2002: Commodore R.P. Bossier ADC
- 2002–2005: Commodore A.M. Hussain
- 2005–2008: Commodore David Steel ADC
- 2008–2011: Commodore Rick Thompson
- 2011–2012: Commodore Tony Radakin
- 2012–2018: Commodore Jeremy Rigby CBE ADC
- 2018–2019: Commodore Jim Higham OBE ADC
- 2019–2022: Commodore Jeremy Bailey ADC
- 2022–2024: Commodore John Voyce OBE ADC
- 2024–present: Commodore Marcel Rosenberg ADC

(decorations and ranks detailed at the time of being in Command, and do not reflect subsequent promotions, or honours and awards)

== See also ==
- Portsmouth Dockyard (Tissot), 1877 painting

== Bibliography ==
- Goss, James (1984). Portsmouth-built warships 1497–1967. Kenneth Mason.
