= List of active Royal Navy ships =

List of current ships in the Royal Navy

The Royal Navy is the principal naval warfare service branch of the British Armed Forces. Its assets include both commissioned warships and non-commissioned vessels. As of July 2026, there are 60 commissioned and active ships, including auxiliary ships, in the Royal Navy.

Of the commissioned vessels, thirteen are major surface combatants (two aircraft carriers, six guided missile destroyers and five frigates) and ten are nuclear-powered submarines (four ballistic missile submarines and six fleet submarines). In addition the Navy possesses seven mine countermeasures vessels, twenty-six patrol vessels, two survey vessels, one icebreaker and one historic warship, Victory.

The total displacement of the Royal Navy's commissioned and active ships is approximately 391,000 tonnes.

The Royal Navy also includes several smaller non-commissioned assets. The naval training vessels Brecon and Hindostan can be found based at the Royal Navy stone frigates HMS Raleigh and the Britannia Royal Naval College, respectively. Non-commissioned Sea-class workboats, procured under Project Vahana, are operated by the Royal Navy in various support, survey and training roles, replacing previous P1000 Class Picket Boat vessels. This class of vessel also incorporates an autonomous minehunting variant (known as the Arcims-class), while another autonomous vessel, Madfox, is employed in varied roles including as a testbed for autonomous combat operations. Madfox and other experimental vessels, including XV Patrick Blackett and autonomous Rigid Inflatable Boats (RIBs) (such as those based on the Pacific 24 boat or Rattler USVs - several of which have been acquired since 2025), are operated by the Fleet Experimentation Squadron within the Disruptive Capabilities and Technologies Office. As of 2025, XV Excalibur, an Extra-Large Uncrewed Underwater Vehicle (XLUUV), was also operated by the Squadron while other autonomous surface vessels, for minehunting and other roles, were in service and in the process of procurement from Thales Group and Kraken Technologies. In November 2026, the Royal Navy formed the '1st Autonomous Squadron' to operate uncrewed boats on frontline operations. Initially the Squadron is being equipped with the Kraken K3 Scout USV and the Rattler uncrewed vehicle.

Besides the Royal Navy, the Royal Fleet Auxiliary (RFA) and the Royal Marines operate their own flotillas of vessels which complement the assets of the Royal Navy. These vessels are not included in this list or the above figures. Nevertheless, combined, the Royal Navy and RFA have 69 vessels with a total displacement of about 635,000 tonnes, with the principal landing craft of the Royal Marines having an additional combined displacement of about 2,200 tonnes.

As a supporting contingent of His Majesty's Naval Service, the civilian Marine Services operate nearly 100 auxiliary ships (including coastal logistics, tugs and research vessels) in support of Royal Navy and Royal Fleet Auxiliary operations.

In the United Kingdom, the Royal Navy operates three main bases where commissioned ships are based: HMNB Portsmouth, HMNB Devonport and HMNB Clyde. A number of commissioned vessels, belonging to the University Royal Naval Units (URNU), are stationed at various other locations around the United Kingdom.

The Royal Navy's principal overseas base is HMS Jufair in Bahrain. However, as of early 2026 there were no crewed vessels permanently based there.

Two fast patrol boats normally form part of the Gibraltar Squadron and are permanently based there. Some River-class offshore patrol vessels are also forward-deployed: including in the Falkland Islands, in the Indo-Pacific region and, somewhat more intermittently, in the Caribbean or out of Gibraltar. Additionally, the United Kingdom maintains a Joint Logistics Support Base in Duqm, Oman.

All ships and submarines currently in commission with the Royal Navy were built in the United Kingdom, with the exceptions of icebreaker Protector which was built in Norway, the survey vessel Magpie which was substantially built in Ireland, and the specialist mine countermeasures vessel HMS Stirling Castle, a former vessel of the Royal Fleet Auxiliary originally built in Romania. All commissioned vessels of the Royal Navy bear the ship prefix "HMS", for His Majesty's Ship or His Majesty's Submarine.

== Availability and readiness ==
A growing proportion of the Royal Navy's ships are old and some have experienced significant availability and maintenance problems. The First Sea Lord, Gwyn Jenkins, has stated that the Royal Navy is not yet as ready for an armed conflict as it should be, with full war readiness targeted for the end of the decade. As of June 2026, none of the Royal Navy's six fleet submarines (attack submarine) are reportedly deployable at sea, due to several factors including maintenance works.

== Ceremonial/Historic ship ==
Flagship of the First Sea Lord
Class	Ship	No.	Commissioned	Displacement	Type	Homeport	Note
Classic first-rate (1)
–	HMS Victory	–	1778 (Note: Launched in 1765 and commissioned in 1778, making Victory the world's oldest warship still in commission.)	3,556 tonnes	First-rate ship of the line	Portsmouth	

== Submarine service ==
Submarine service
Class	Ship	No.	Commissioned	Displacement	Type	Homeport	Note
Strategic (4)
Vanguard class	HMS Vanguard	S28	1993	15,900 tonnes	Ballistic missile submarine	Clyde	
Vanguard class	HMS Victorious	S29	1995	15,900 tonnes	Ballistic missile submarine	Clyde	
Vanguard class	HMS Vigilant	S30	1996	15,900 tonnes	Ballistic missile submarine	Clyde	
Vanguard class	HMS Vengeance	S31	1999	15,900 tonnes	Ballistic missile submarine	Clyde	
Fleet (6)
Astute class	HMS Astute	S119	2010	7,400 tonnes	Fleet submarine	Clyde	
Astute class	HMS Ambush	S120	2013	7,400 tonnes	Fleet submarine	Clyde	
Astute class	HMS Artful	S121	2016	7,400 tonnes	Fleet submarine	Clyde	
Astute class	HMS Audacious	S122	2021	7,400 tonnes	Fleet submarine	Clyde	
Astute class	HMS Anson	S123	2022	7,400 tonnes	Fleet submarine	Clyde	
Astute class	HMS Agamemnon	S124	2025	7,400 tonnes	Fleet submarine	Clyde	(Note: On sea trials as of September 2026; may not be fully operational until 2027.)

== Surface fleet ==
Surface fleet
Class	Ship	No.	Commissioned	Displacement	Type	Homeport	Note
Aircraft carriers (2)
Queen Elizabeth class	HMS Queen Elizabeth	R08	2017	80,600 tonnes	Aircraft carrier	Portsmouth	
Queen Elizabeth class	HMS Prince of Wales	R09	2019	80,600 tonnes	Aircraft carrier	Portsmouth	(Note: Prince of Wales is the current Fleet Flagship as of late 2024.)
Destroyers (6)
Type 45 destroyer (Daring class)	HMS Daring	D32	2009	8,500 tonnes	Anti-air guided-missile destroyer	Portsmouth	
Type 45 destroyer (Daring class)	HMS Dauntless	D33	2010	8,500 tonnes	Anti-air guided-missile destroyer	Portsmouth	
Type 45 destroyer (Daring class)	HMS Diamond	D34	2011	8,500 tonnes	Anti-air guided-missile destroyer	Portsmouth	
Type 45 destroyer (Daring class)	HMS Dragon	D35	2012	8,500 tonnes	Anti-air guided-missile destroyer	Portsmouth	
Type 45 destroyer (Daring class)	HMS Defender	D36	2013	8,500 tonnes	Anti-air guided-missile destroyer	Portsmouth	
Type 45 destroyer (Daring class)	HMS Duncan	D37	2013	8,500 tonnes	Anti-air guided-missile destroyer	Portsmouth	(Note: Refit)
Frigates (5)
Type 23 frigate (Duke class)	HMS Somerset	F82	1996	4,900 tonnes	Frigate	Devonport	
Type 23 frigate (Duke class)	HMS Sutherland	F81	1997	4,900 tonnes	Frigate	Devonport	
Type 23 frigate (Duke class)	HMS Kent	F78	2000	4,900 tonnes	Frigate	Devonport	
Type 23 frigate (Duke class)	HMS Portland	F79	2001	4,900 tonnes	Frigate	Devonport	
Type 23 frigate (Duke class)	HMS St Albans	F83	2002	4,900 tonnes	Frigate	Devonport	
Offshore patrol (8)
River class	HMS Tyne	P281	2003	1,700 tonnes	Offshore patrol vessel	Portsmouth	
River class	HMS Severn	P282	2003 and 2021	1,700 tonnes	Offshore patrol vessel	Portsmouth	
River class	HMS Mersey	P283	2003	1,700 tonnes	Offshore patrol vessel	Portsmouth	
River class	HMS Forth	P222	2018	2,000 tonnes	Offshore patrol vessel	Portsmouth	
River class	HMS Medway	P223	2019	2,000 tonnes	Offshore patrol vessel	Portsmouth	(Note: HMS Medway is forward deployed, operating from Mare Harbour as guardship in the Falkland Islands.)
River class	HMS Trent	P224	2020	2,000 tonnes	Offshore patrol vessel	Portsmouth	
River class	HMS Tamar	P233	2020	2,000 tonnes	Offshore patrol vessel	Portsmouth	(Note: HMS Tamar is forward deployed to the Indo-Pacific region with her primary logistics hub at the British Defence Singapore Support Unit in Singapore)
River class	HMS Spey	P234	2021	2,000 tonnes	Offshore patrol vessel	Portsmouth	(Note: HMS Spey is forward deployed to the Indo-Pacific region with her primary logistics hub at the British Defence Singapore Support Unit in Singapore)
Mine countermeasures (7)
Hunt class	HMS Ledbury	M30	1981	750 tonnes	Minehunter	Portsmouth	
Hunt class	HMS Cattistock	M31	1982	750 tonnes	Minehunter	Portsmouth	
Hunt class	HMS Brocklesby	M33	1983	750 tonnes	Minehunter	Portsmouth	
Hunt class	HMS Middleton	M34	1984	750 tonnes	Minehunter	Portsmouth	
Hunt class	HMS Hurworth	M39	1985	750 tonnes	Minehunter	Portsmouth	
Sandown class	HMS Bangor	M109	2000	600 tonnes	Minehunter	Clyde	
-	HMS Stirling Castle	M01	2025	6,000 tonnes	Specialist mine hunting ship	Portsmouth	(Note: Former vessel of the Royal Fleet Auxiliary serving as mothership for Royal Navy autonomous minehunting/sweeping systems.)
Coastal & fast patrol (18)
Archer class	HMS Archer	P264	1985	54 tonnes	Patrol boat, University Royal Naval Units	Edinburgh	
Archer class	HMS Biter	P270	1986	54 tonnes	Patrol boat, University Royal Naval Units	Liverpool	
Archer class	HMS Smiter	P272	1988	54 tonnes	Patrol boat, University Royal Naval Units	Portsmouth	
Archer class	HMS Pursuer	P273	1988	54 tonnes	Patrol boat, University Royal Naval Units	Glasgow	
Archer class	HMS Blazer	P279	1988	54 tonnes	Patrol boat, University Royal Naval Units	Portsmouth	
Archer class	HMS Dasher	P280	1988	54 tonnes	Patrol boat, University Royal Naval Units	Portsmouth	
Archer class	HMS Puncher	P291	1988	54 tonnes	Patrol boat, University Royal Naval Units	Portsmouth	
Archer class	HMS Charger	P292	1988	54 tonnes	Patrol boat, University Royal Naval Units	Liverpool	
Archer class	HMS Ranger	P293	1988	54 tonnes	Patrol boat, University Royal Naval Units	Portsmouth	
Archer class	HMS Trumpeter	P294	1988	54 tonnes	Patrol boat, University Royal Naval Units	Ipswich	
Archer class	HMS Express	P163	1988	54 tonnes	Patrol boat, University Royal Naval Units	Cardiff	
Archer class	HMS Example	P165	1985	54 tonnes	Patrol boat, University Royal Naval Units	Gateshead	
Archer class	HMS Explorer	P164	1986	54 tonnes	Patrol boat, University Royal Naval Units	Hull	
Archer class	HMS Exploit	P167	1988	54 tonnes	Patrol boat, University Royal Naval Units	Portsmouth	
Archer class	HMS Tracker	P274	1998	54 tonnes	Patrol boat	Clyde	(Note: Forms part of the Faslane Patrol Boat Squadron providing security to nuclear submarines entering and leaving the waters in and around HMNB Clyde.)
Archer class	HMS Raider	P275	1998	54 tonnes	Patrol boat	Clyde	(Note: Forms part of the Faslane Patrol Boat Squadron providing security to nuclear submarines entering and leaving the waters in and around HMNB Clyde.)
Cutlass class	HMS Cutlass	P295	2022	35 tonnes	Patrol boat	Gibraltar	(Note: Permanently based in the British Overseas Territory of Gibraltar. Forms part of the Gibraltar Squadron.)
Cutlass class	HMS Dagger	P296	2022	35 tonnes	Patrol boat	Gibraltar	(Note: Permanently based in the British Overseas Territory of Gibraltar. Forms part of the Gibraltar Squadron.)

== Auxiliary and non-commissioned vessels ==
See also: Ships of the Royal Fleet Auxiliary and vessels operated by Serco Marine Services

RN auxiliary ships
Class	Ship	No.	Commissioned	Displacement	Type	Homeport	Note
Survey (3)
Scott class	HMS Scott	H131	1997	13,500 tonnes	Ocean survey	Devonport	
–	HMS Protector	A173	2011	5,000 tonnes	Icebreaker & survey	Devonport	(Note: Deployed in Antarctic waters during the regional summer but inactive as of 2026 due to technical problems.)
Sea class	HMS Magpie	H130	2018	37 tonnes	Survey motor launch	Devonport	
Non-commissioned vessels (56+)
–	XV Excalibur	N/A	2025	19 tonnes	Extra-Large Uncrewed Underwater Vehicle (XLUUV)	Devonport	
–	XV Patrick Blackett	X01	2022	270 tonnes	Experimental vessel	Portsmouth	
–	XV Madfox	N/A	2021	c. 10 tonnes	Unmanned surface vessel (USV)	Portsmouth	
Hunt class	Brecon	M29	1979	750 tonnes	Static Training Ship	HMS Raleigh	
Sandown class	Hindostan (ex-Cromer)	M103	1992	600 tonnes	Static Training Ship	Britannia Royal Naval College	
Sea class	34 vessels: 8 x 15 m Officer Training Units; 6 x 15 m Diver Training/Support Boats; 4 x 15 m Survey/hydrographic Modules; 3 x 13.8 m Passenger Transfer Boats (PTBs); 10 x 11 m Standard Workboats; 3 x 11 m Small Survey Modules	–	2018 to 2024	15 to 23 tonnes	Workboats	–	(Note: Officer training units assigned to Britannia Royal Naval College; Diver support boats at HMNB Portsmouth (three units), Devonport, Clyde and Gibraltar (one unit each); Passenger Transfer units to HMS Prince of Wales; and two or more small survey modules to HMS Protector and HMS Scott.)
ALN-139 class	Sea Harrier	–	2017	c. 15 - 20 tonnes	Workboats	–	(Note: Three assigned as passenger transfer vessels to HMS Queen Elizabeth)
ALN-139 class	Buccaneer	–	2017	c. 15 - 20 tonnes	Workboats	–	(Note: Three assigned as passenger transfer vessels to HMS Queen Elizabeth)
ALN-139 class	Sea Vixen	–	2017	c. 15 - 20 tonnes	Workboats	–	(Note: Three assigned as passenger transfer vessels to HMS Queen Elizabeth)
ALN-139 class	Swordfish	–	2017	c. 15 - 20 tonnes	Workboats	–	(Note: Three assigned as passenger transfer vessels to HMS Queen Elizabeth)
Arcims class	RNMB Hussar	–	2021 to 2023	< 10 tonnes	Autonomous mine hunting / mine sweeping	Clyde	(Note: Four vessels (Halcyon, Hussar, Hydra and Harrier) enabled for autonomous/uncrewed operations. Hebe's greater size enables her to accommodate a Portable Operations Centre Afloat; other vessels employed as crewed workboats.)
Arcims class	RNMB Hazard	–	2021 to 2023	< 10 tonnes	Autonomous mine hunting / mine sweeping	Clyde	(Note: Four vessels (Halcyon, Hussar, Hydra and Harrier) enabled for autonomous/uncrewed operations. Hebe's greater size enables her to accommodate a Portable Operations Centre Afloat; other vessels employed as crewed workboats.)
Arcims class	RNMB Hellcat	–	2021 to 2023	< 10 tonnes	Autonomous mine hunting / mine sweeping	Clyde	(Note: Four vessels (Halcyon, Hussar, Hydra and Harrier) enabled for autonomous/uncrewed operations. Hebe's greater size enables her to accommodate a Portable Operations Centre Afloat; other vessels employed as crewed workboats.)
Arcims class	RNMB Halcyon	–	2021 to 2023	< 10 tonnes	Autonomous mine hunting / mine sweeping	Clyde	(Note: Four vessels (Halcyon, Hussar, Hydra and Harrier) enabled for autonomous/uncrewed operations. Hebe's greater size enables her to accommodate a Portable Operations Centre Afloat; other vessels employed as crewed workboats.)
Arcims class	RNMB Harrier	–	2021 to 2023	< 10 tonnes	Autonomous mine hunting / mine sweeping	Clyde	(Note: Four vessels (Halcyon, Hussar, Hydra and Harrier) enabled for autonomous/uncrewed operations. Hebe's greater size enables her to accommodate a Portable Operations Centre Afloat; other vessels employed as crewed workboats.)
Arcims class	RNMB Hydra	–	2021 to 2023	< 10 tonnes	Autonomous mine hunting / mine sweeping	Clyde	(Note: Four vessels (Halcyon, Hussar, Hydra and Harrier) enabled for autonomous/uncrewed operations. Hebe's greater size enables her to accommodate a Portable Operations Centre Afloat; other vessels employed as crewed workboats.)
Arcims class	RNMB Hebe	–	2021 to 2023	≥ 10 tonnes	Autonomous mine hunting / mine sweeping	Clyde	(Note: Four vessels (Halcyon, Hussar, Hydra and Harrier) enabled for autonomous/uncrewed operations. Hebe's greater size enables her to accommodate a Portable Operations Centre Afloat; other vessels employed as crewed workboats.)
Thales USV class	RNMB Apollo (pre-production unit)	N/A	2021	< 10 tonnes	Autonomous mine hunting / mine sweeping	N/A	(Note: Apollo and Abdiel are pre-production units within joint UK-France MCM programme; Apollo projected to enter operational service in 2026; Ariadne first production USV within a complete Maritime Mine Counter Measures (MMCM) system also consisting of Portable Operation Centre (POC), Synthetic Aperture & Mine Detection Imaging Sonar and Multi-Shot Mine Neutralisation System; total of four production USVs being delivered as part of larger MMCM systems.)
Thales USV class	RNMB Abdiel (pre-production unit)	N/A	2022	< 10 tonnes	Autonomous mine hunting / mine sweeping	N/A	(Note: Apollo and Abdiel are pre-production units within joint UK-France MCM programme; Apollo projected to enter operational service in 2026; Ariadne first production USV within a complete Maritime Mine Counter Measures (MMCM) system also consisting of Portable Operation Centre (POC), Synthetic Aperture & Mine Detection Imaging Sonar and Multi-Shot Mine Neutralisation System; total of four production USVs being delivered as part of larger MMCM systems.)
Thales USV class	RNMB Ariadne (1st production USV)	N/A	2025 / 26	< 10 tonnes	Autonomous mine hunting / mine sweeping	N/A	(Note: Apollo and Abdiel are pre-production units within joint UK-France MCM programme; Apollo projected to enter operational service in 2026; Ariadne first production USV within a complete Maritime Mine Counter Measures (MMCM) system also consisting of Portable Operation Centre (POC), Synthetic Aperture & Mine Detection Imaging Sonar and Multi-Shot Mine Neutralisation System; total of four production USVs being delivered as part of larger MMCM systems.)
Thales USV class	RNMB Adventure (2nd production USV)	N/A	2025 / 26	< 10 tonnes	Autonomous mine hunting / mine sweeping	N/A	(Note: Apollo and Abdiel are pre-production units within joint UK-France MCM programme; Apollo projected to enter operational service in 2026; Ariadne first production USV within a complete Maritime Mine Counter Measures (MMCM) system also consisting of Portable Operation Centre (POC), Synthetic Aperture & Mine Detection Imaging Sonar and Multi-Shot Mine Neutralisation System; total of four production USVs being delivered as part of larger MMCM systems.)
Thales USV class	3rd production USV	N/A	2025 / 26	< 10 tonnes	Autonomous mine hunting / mine sweeping	N/A	(Note: Apollo and Abdiel are pre-production units within joint UK-France MCM programme; Apollo projected to enter operational service in 2026; Ariadne first production USV within a complete Maritime Mine Counter Measures (MMCM) system also consisting of Portable Operation Centre (POC), Synthetic Aperture & Mine Detection Imaging Sonar and Multi-Shot Mine Neutralisation System; total of four production USVs being delivered as part of larger MMCM systems.)
Thales USV class	4th production USV	N/A	2025 / 26	< 10 tonnes	Autonomous mine hunting / mine sweeping	N/A	(Note: Apollo and Abdiel are pre-production units within joint UK-France MCM programme; Apollo projected to enter operational service in 2026; Ariadne first production USV within a complete Maritime Mine Counter Measures (MMCM) system also consisting of Portable Operation Centre (POC), Synthetic Aperture & Mine Detection Imaging Sonar and Multi-Shot Mine Neutralisation System; total of four production USVs being delivered as part of larger MMCM systems.)
K-3 Scout class	"Several dozen" units	–	2026	c. 2.5 tonnes	USV; modular payload, incl. Saab Giraffe 1X radar or counter drone interceptors	–	(Note: Operated by the Surface Flotilla's '1st Autonomous Squadron', the Coastal Forces Squadron and 47 Commando Royal Marines; employed in training, tactical development, experimentation and payload integration roles; with 1st Autonomous Squadron employed in operational ISR/counter drone role)

== Gallery ==
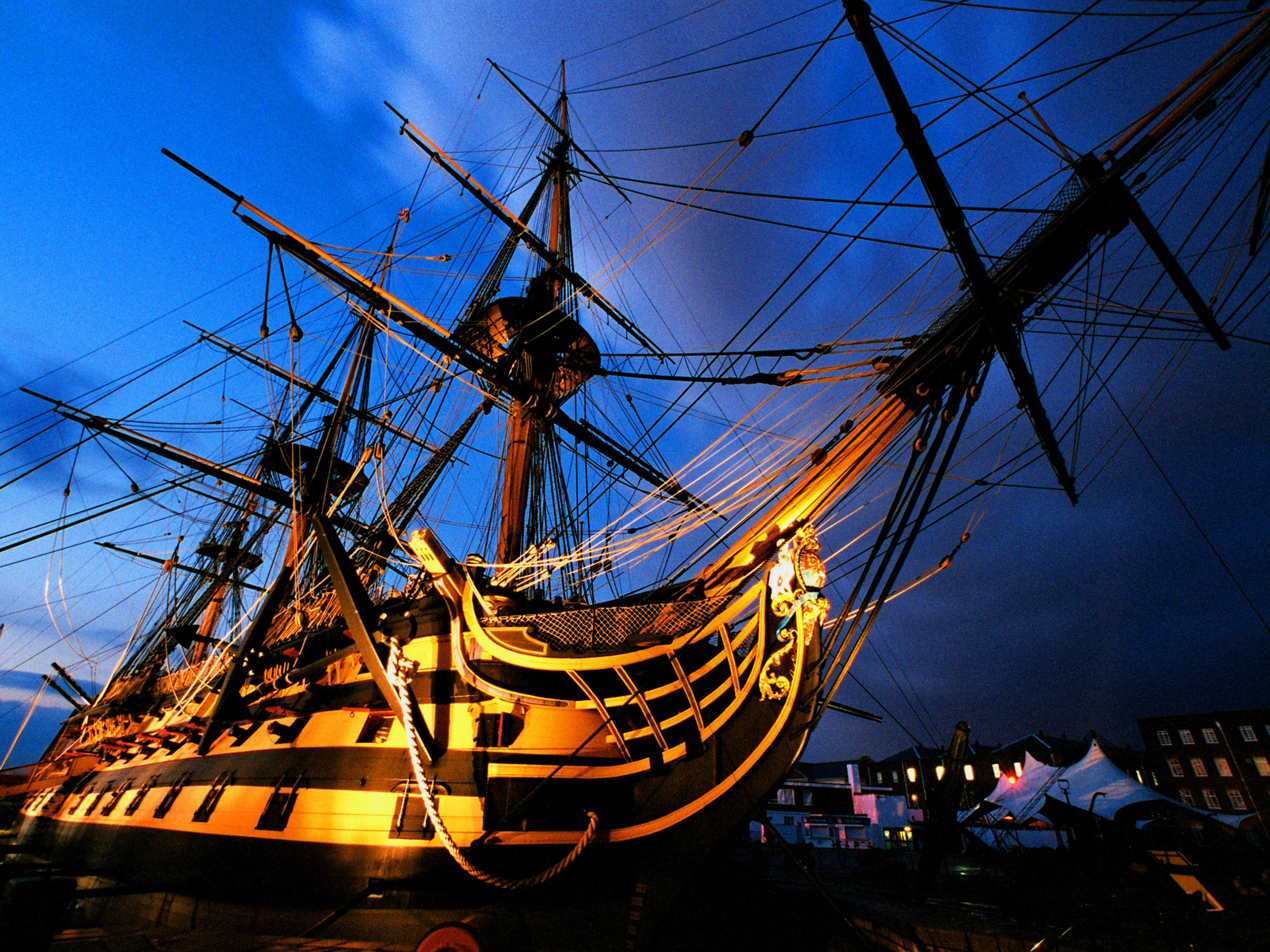
HMS Victory, Flagship of the First Sea Lord

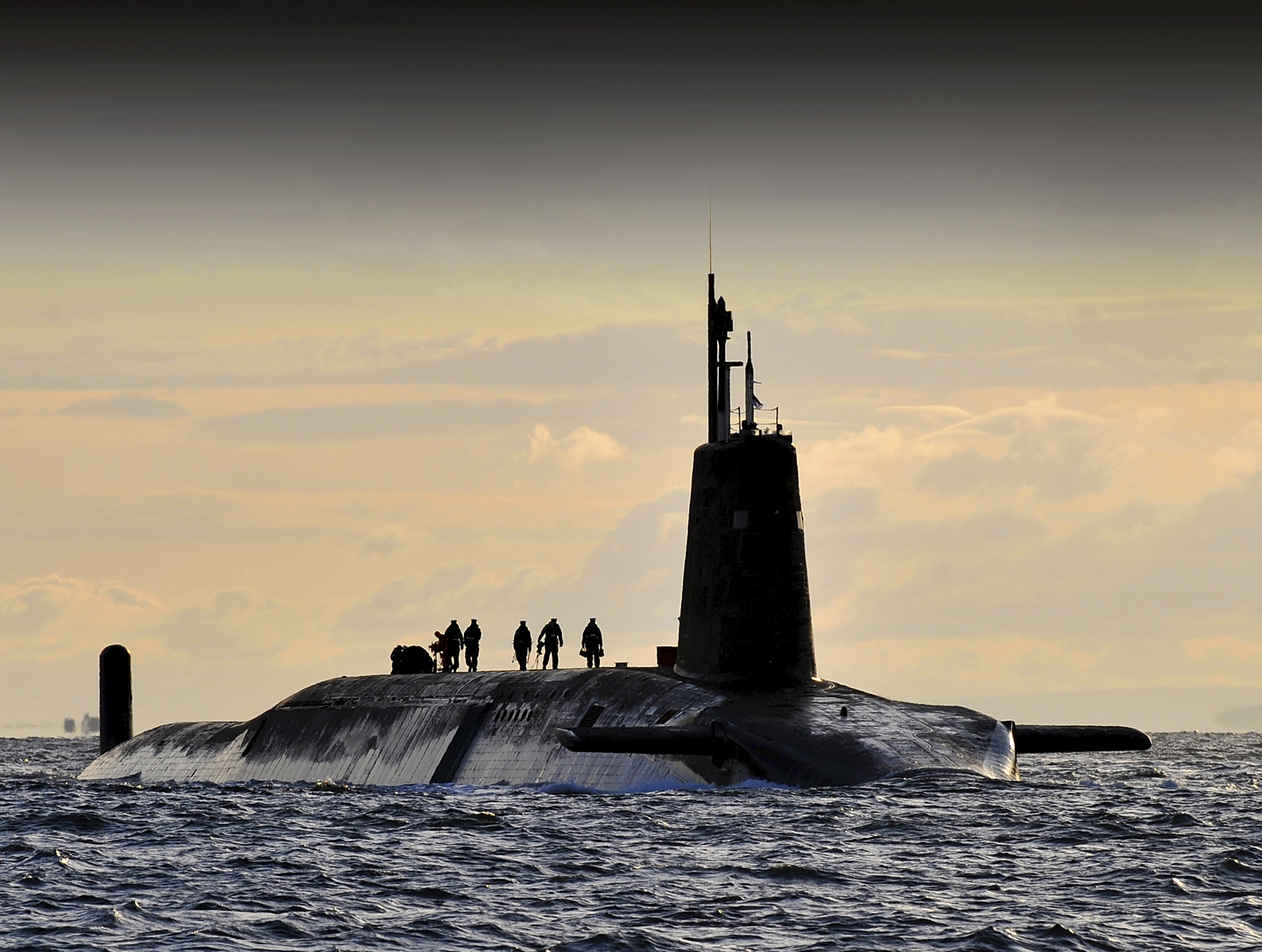
Vanguard (Vanguard class)

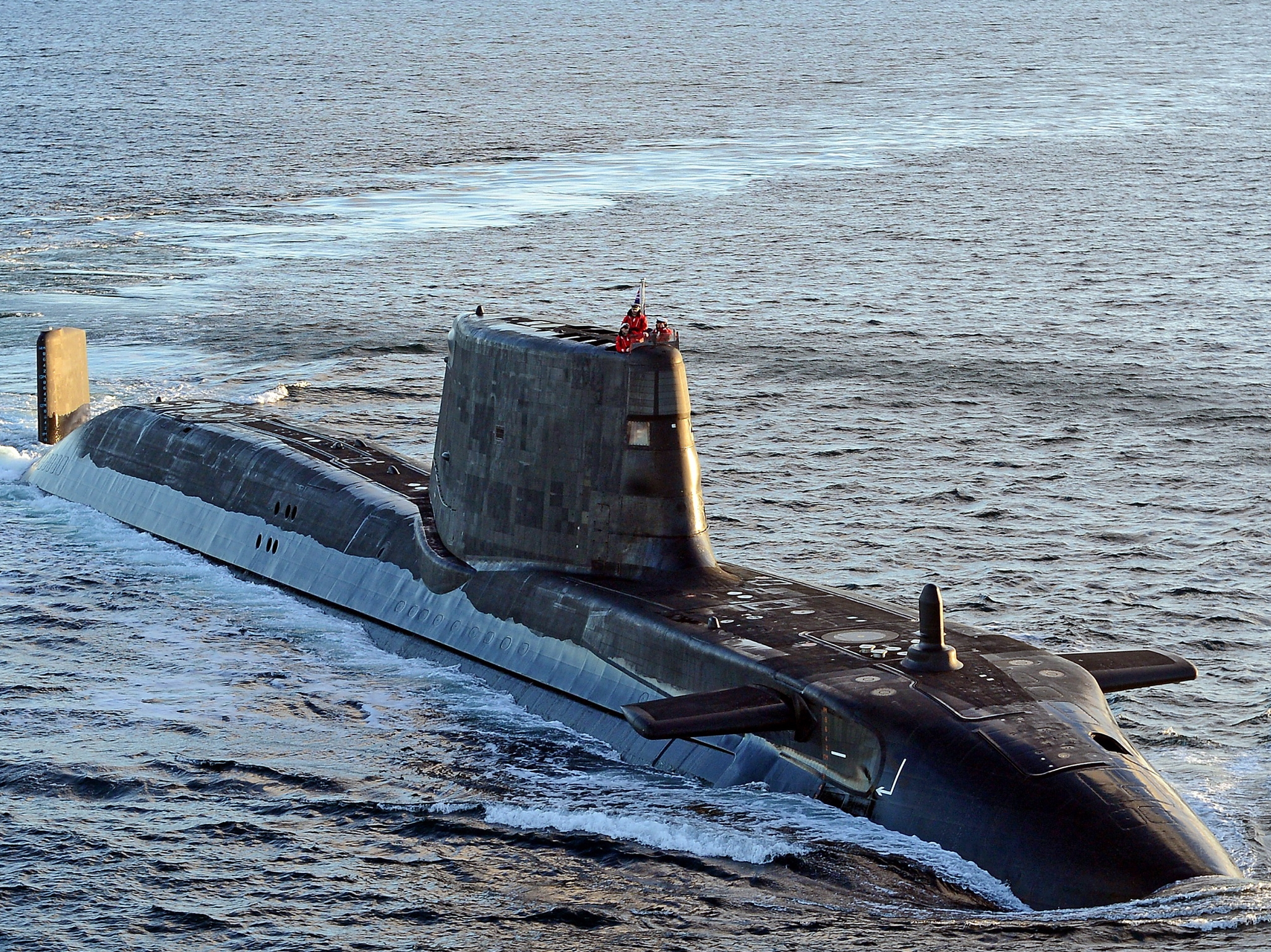
Ambush (Astute class)

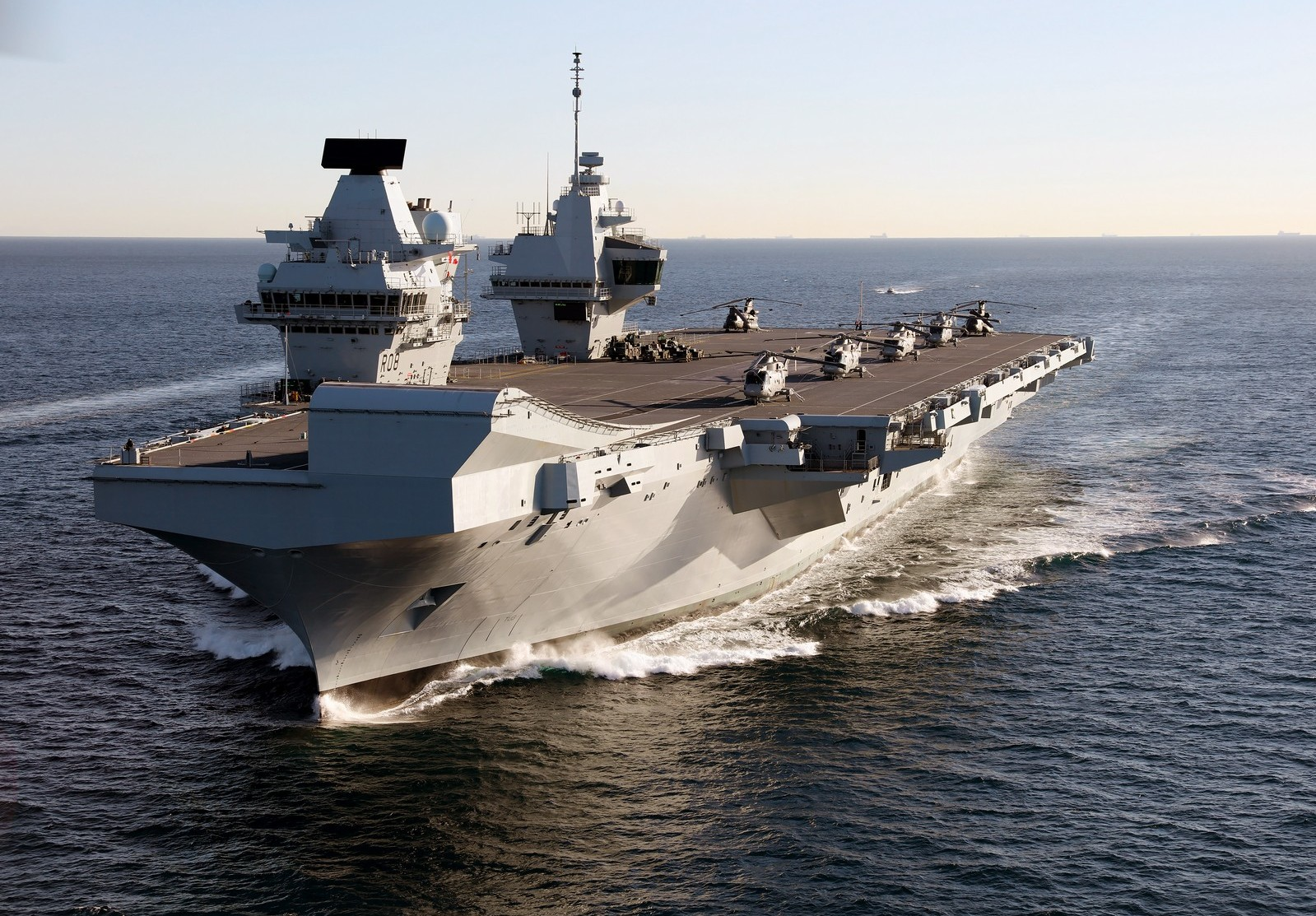
Queen Elizabeth
(Queen Elizabeth class)

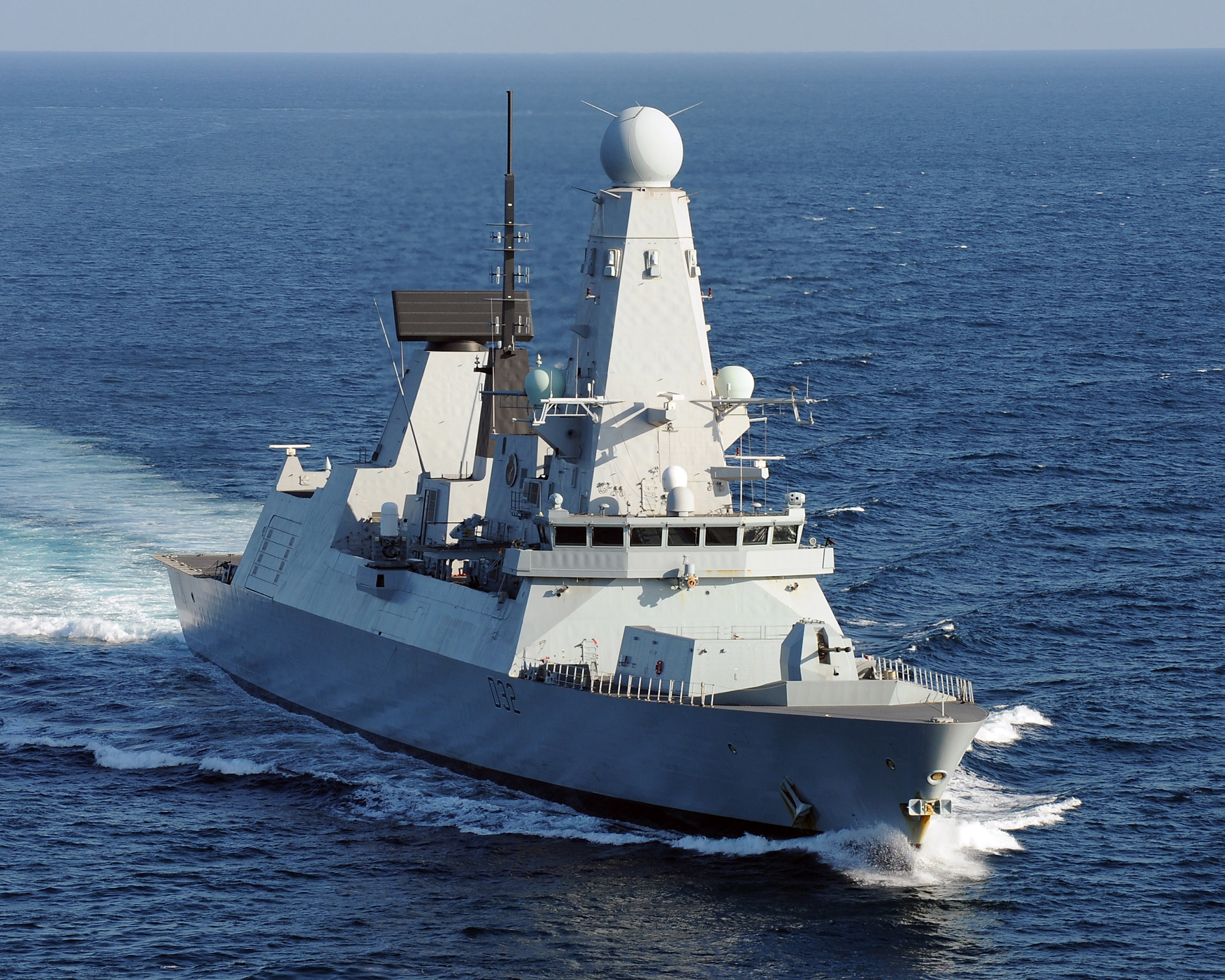
Daring (Type 45 destroyer)

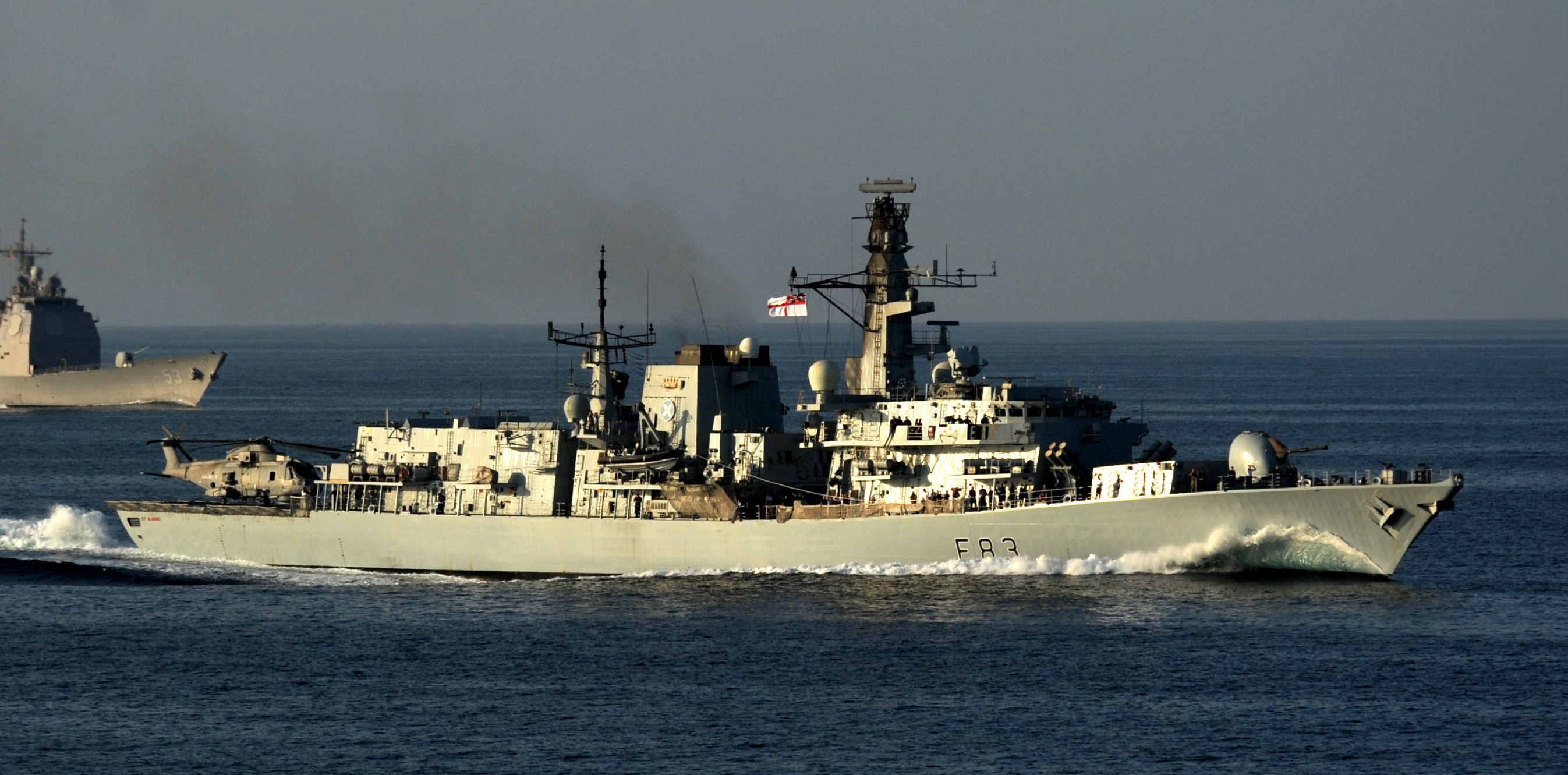
St. Albans (Type 23 frigate)

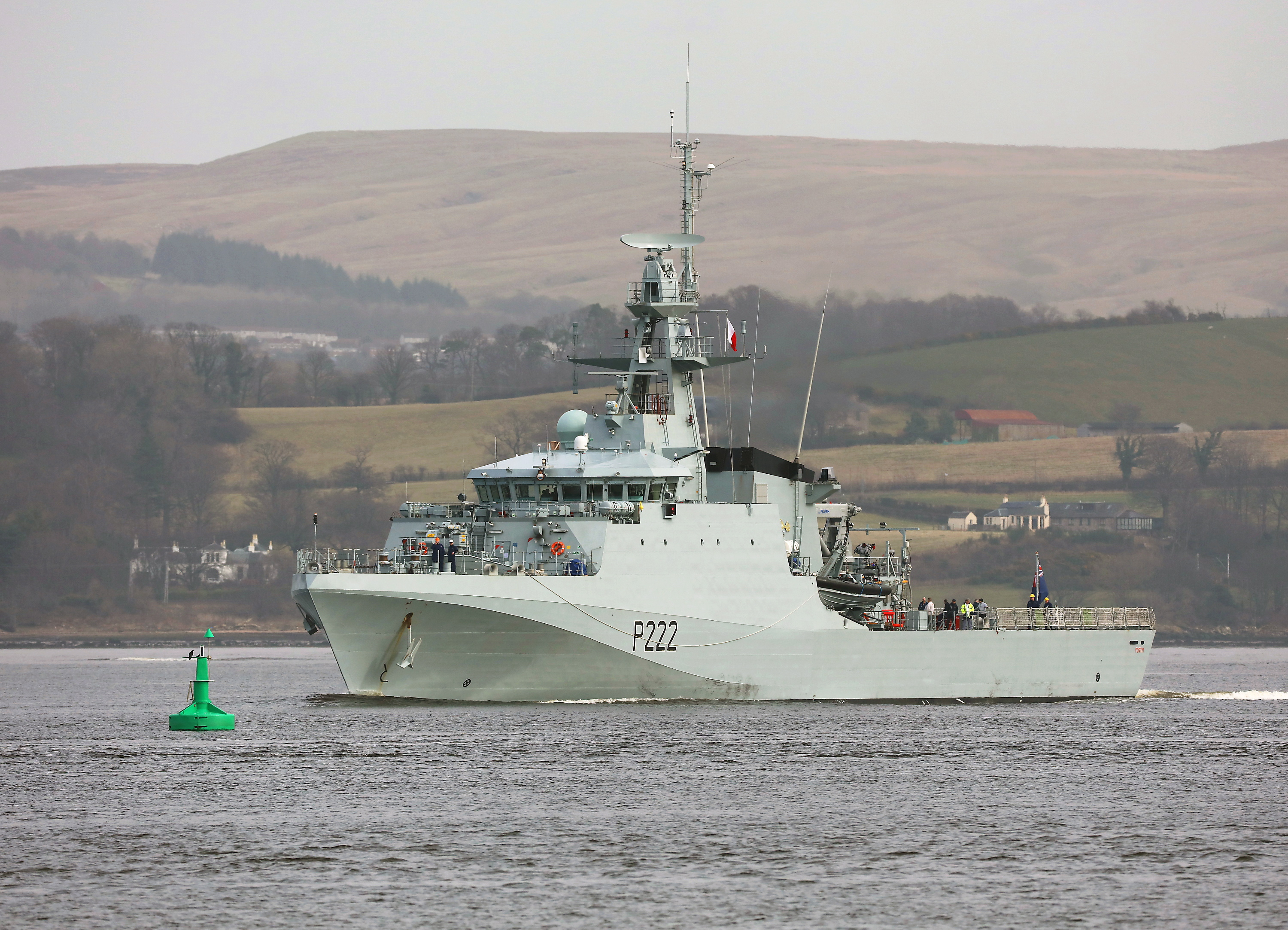
Forth (River class)

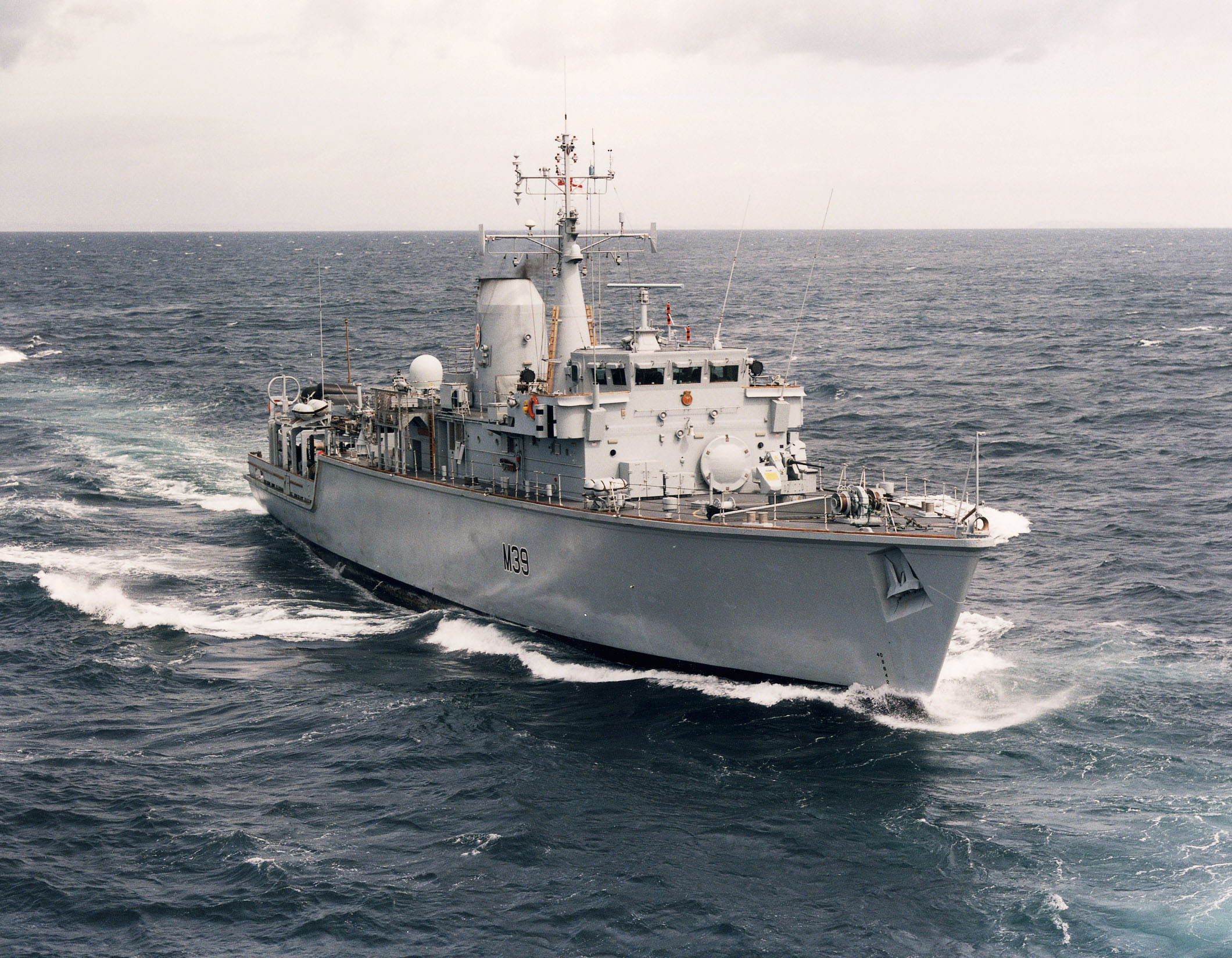
Hurworth (Hunt class)

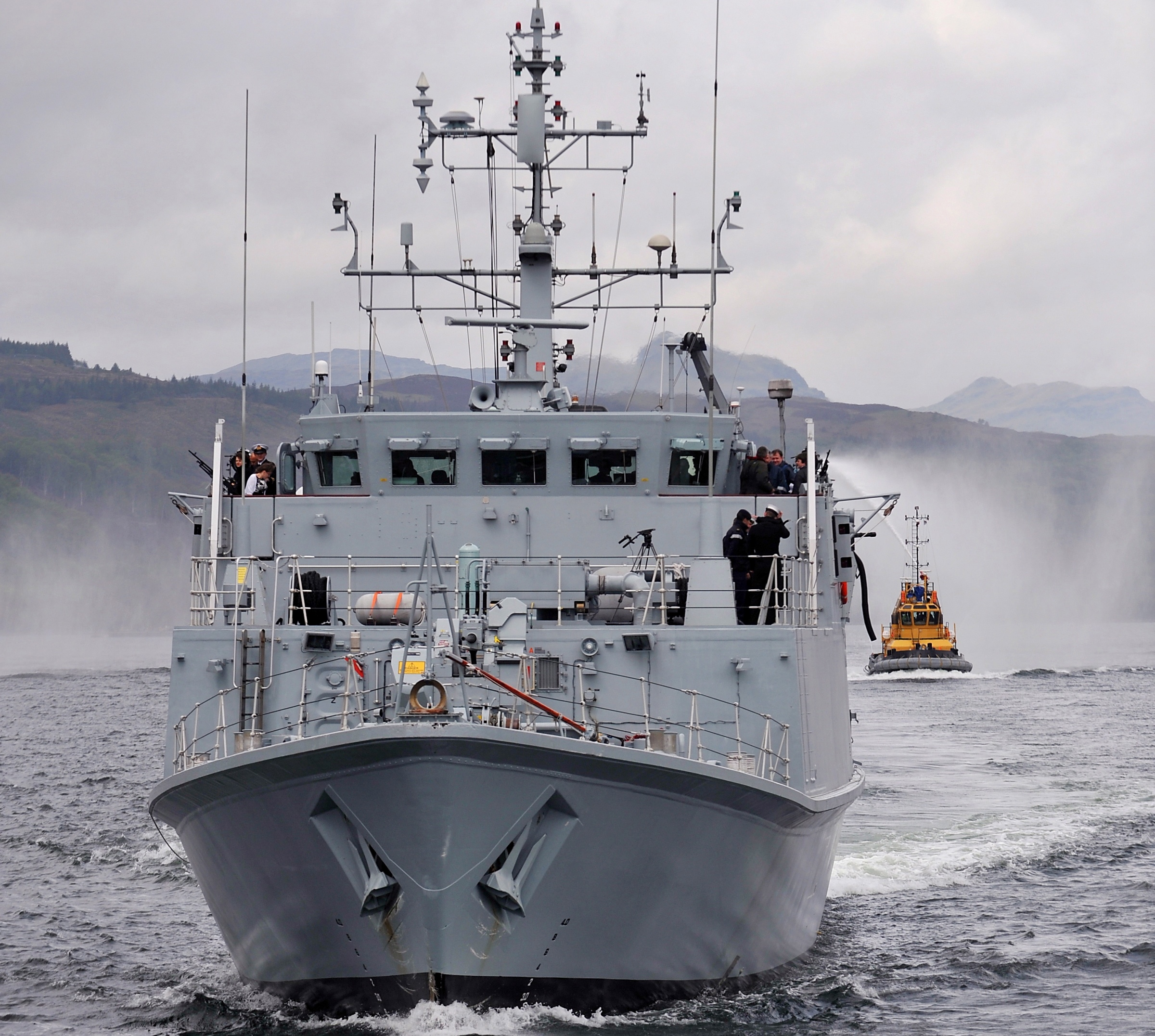
Ramsey (Sandown class)

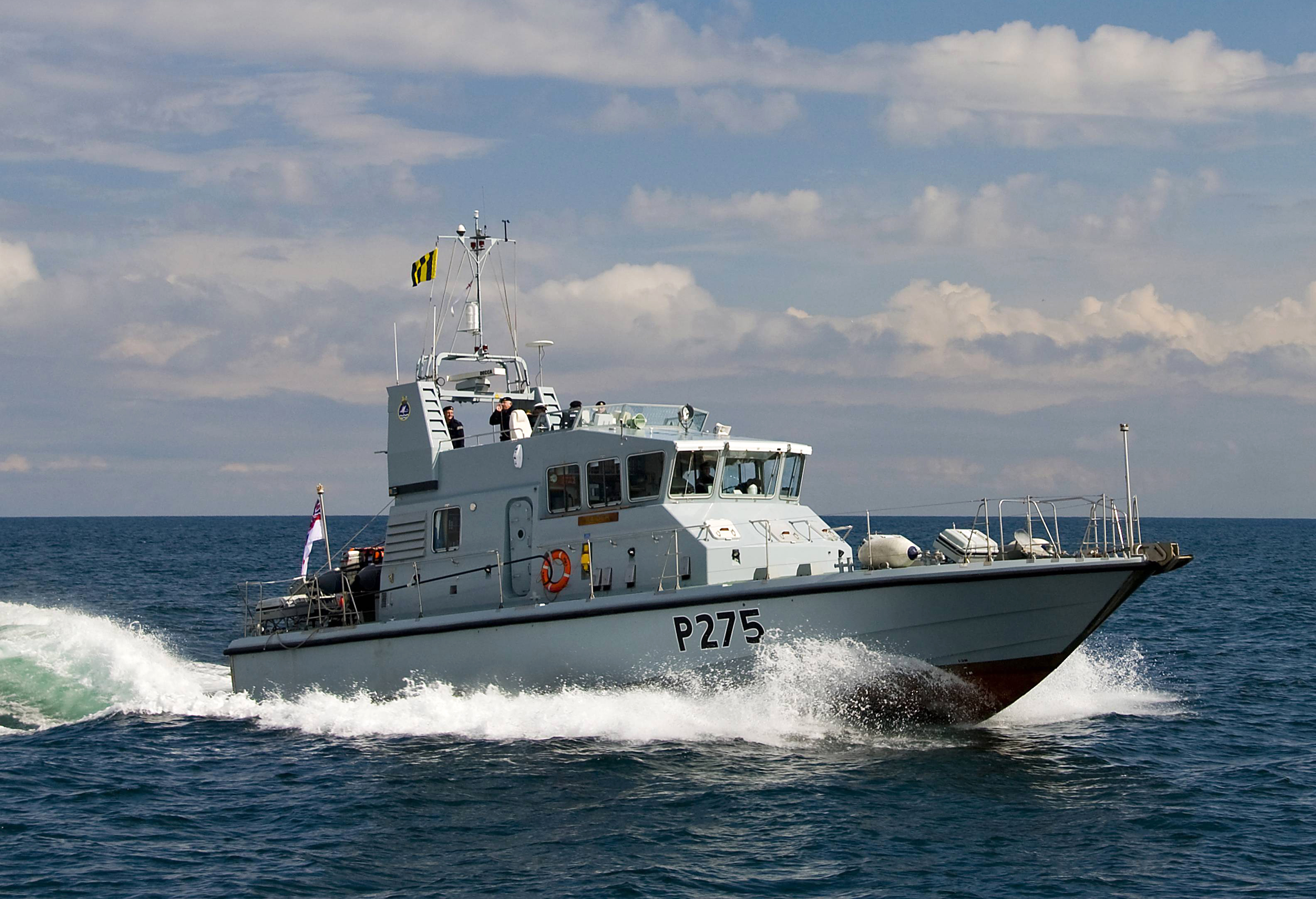
Raider (Archer class)

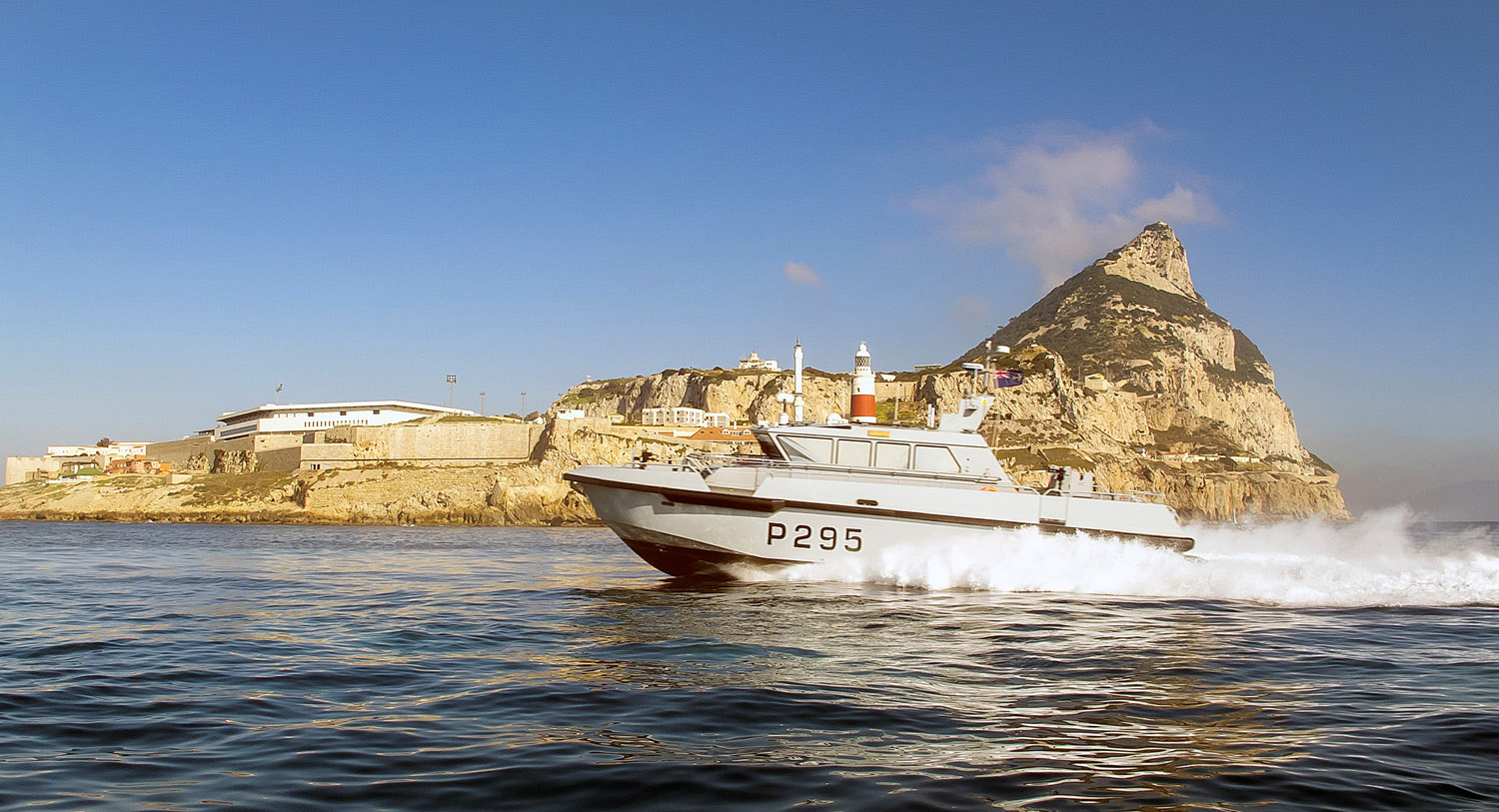
Cutlass (Cutlass class)

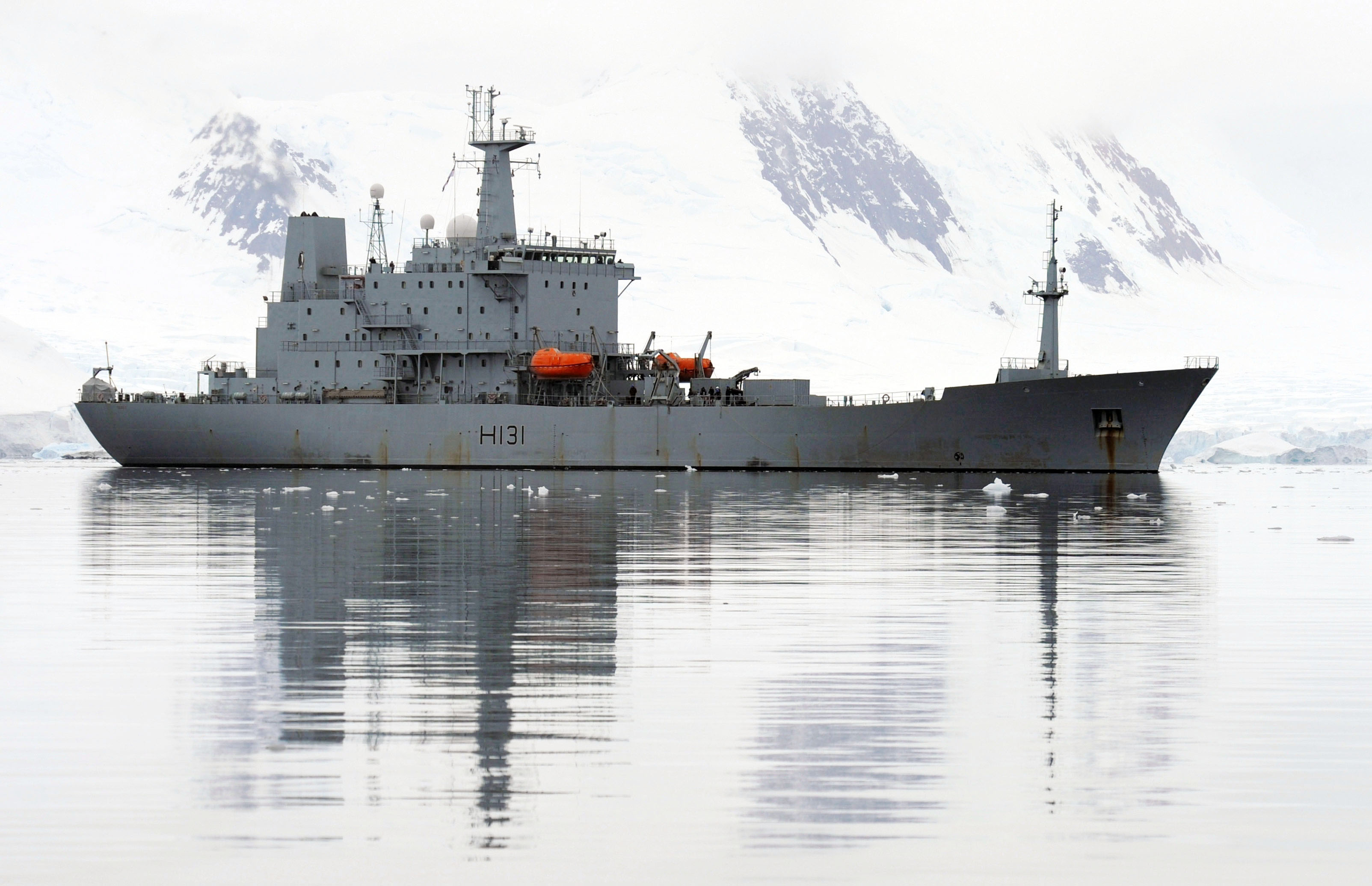
Scott

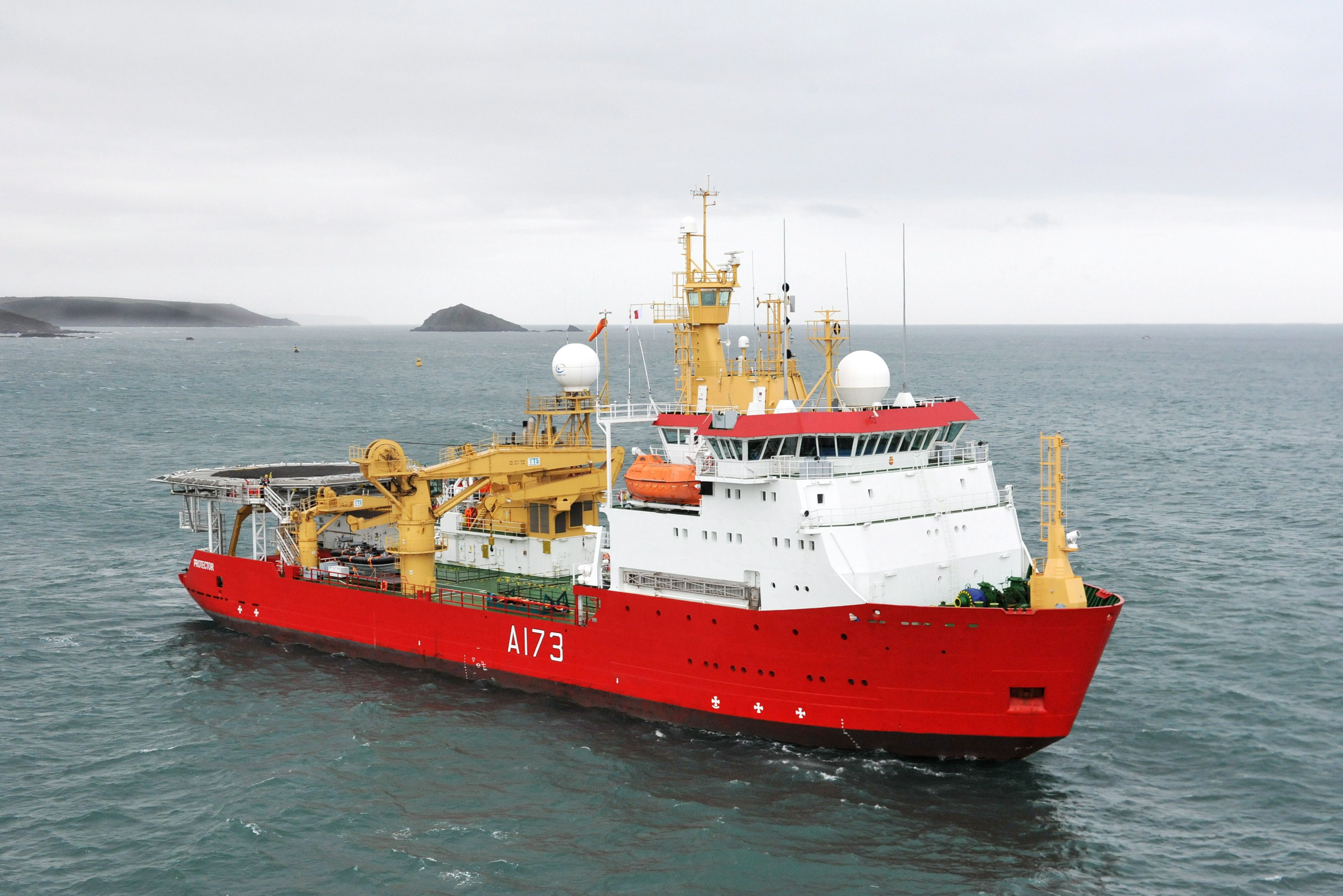
Protector

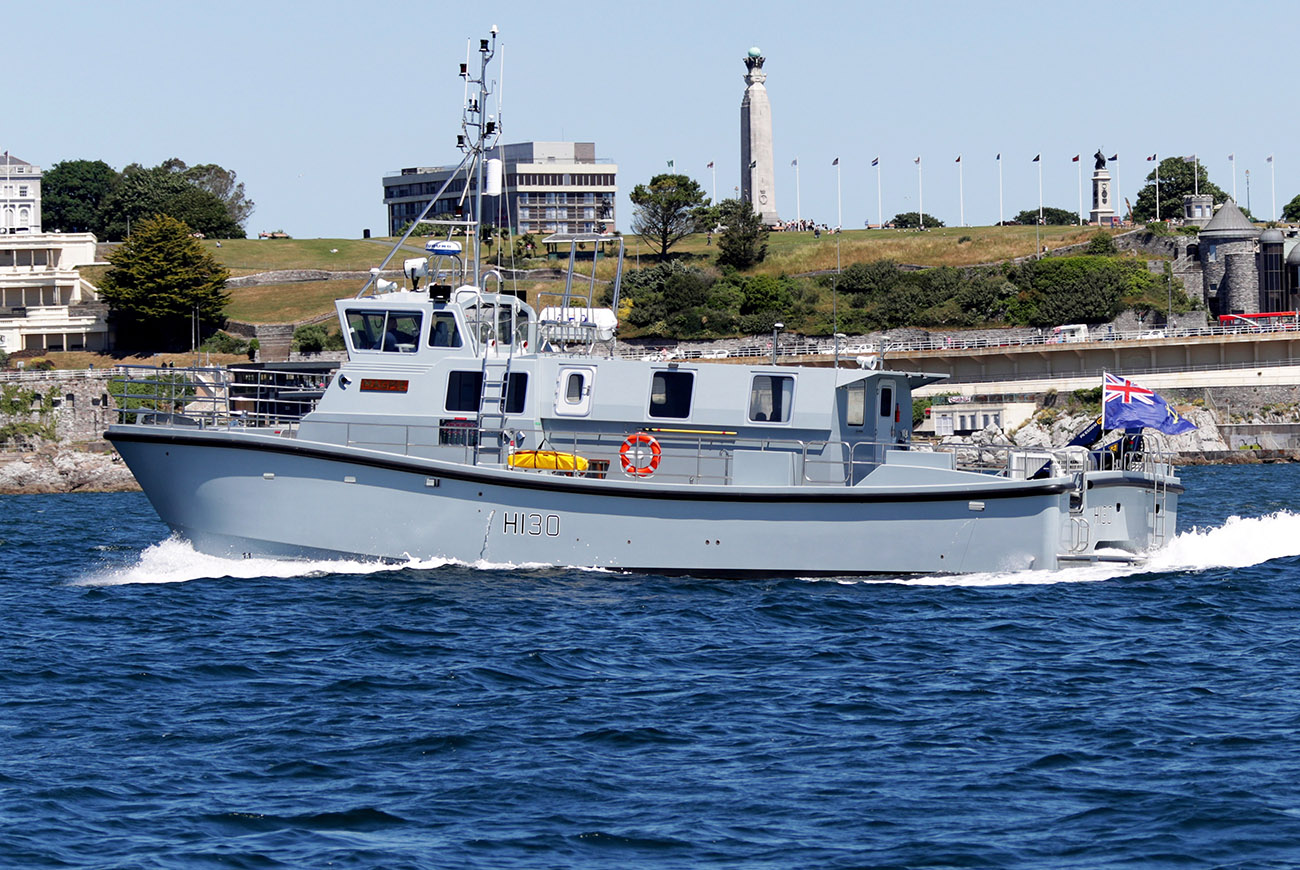
Magpie (Sea class)

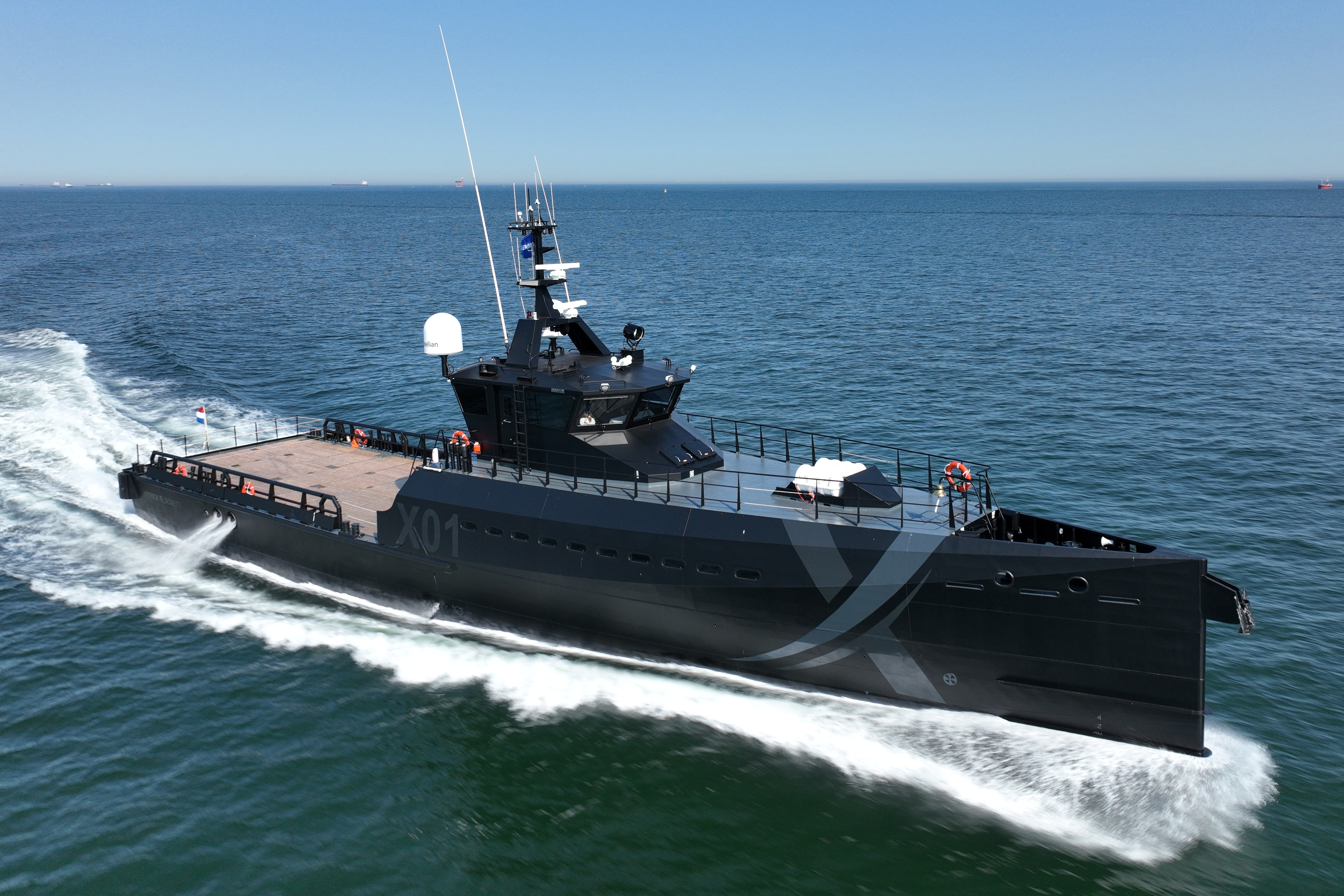
XV Patrick Blackett

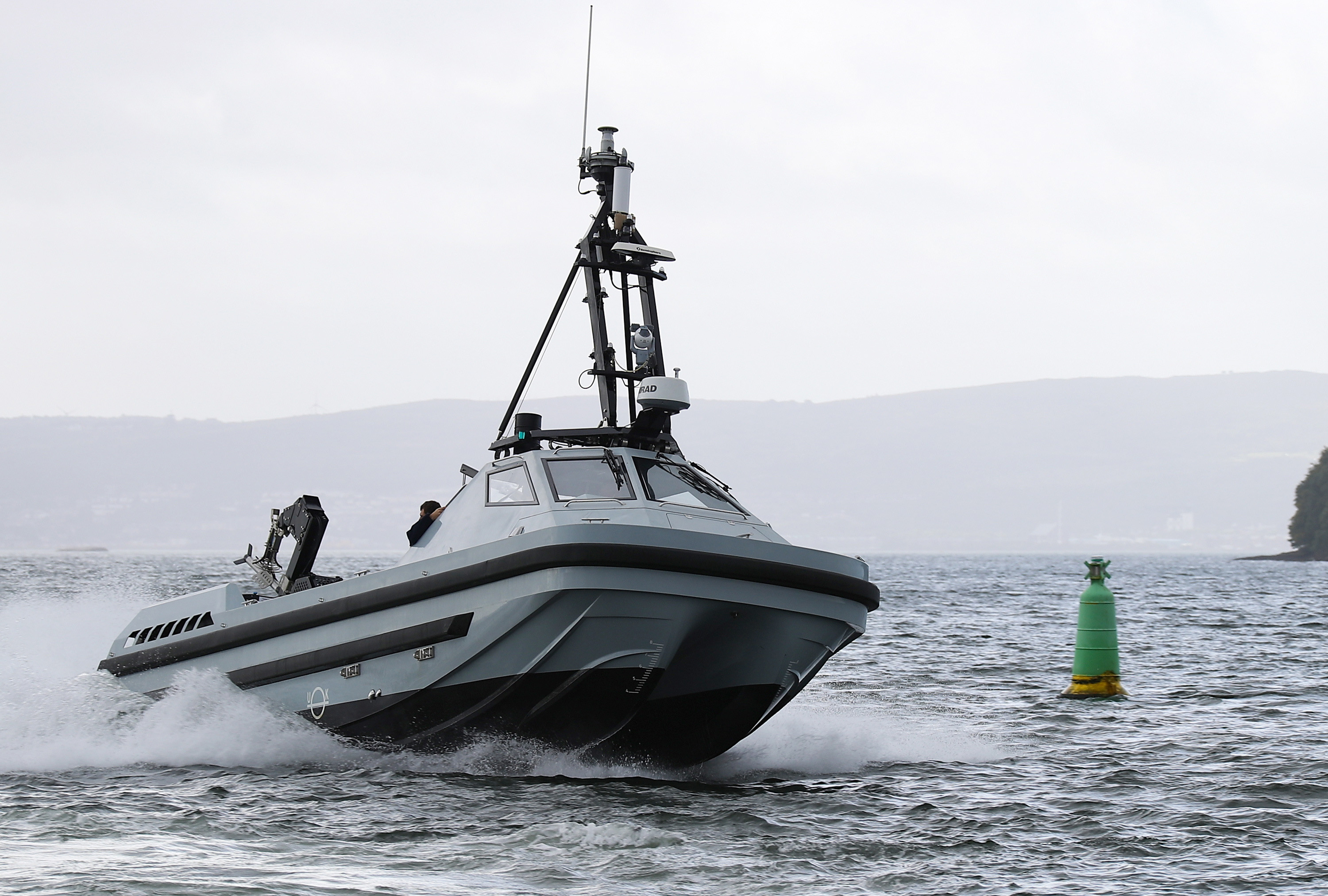
RNMB Harrier (Arcims class)

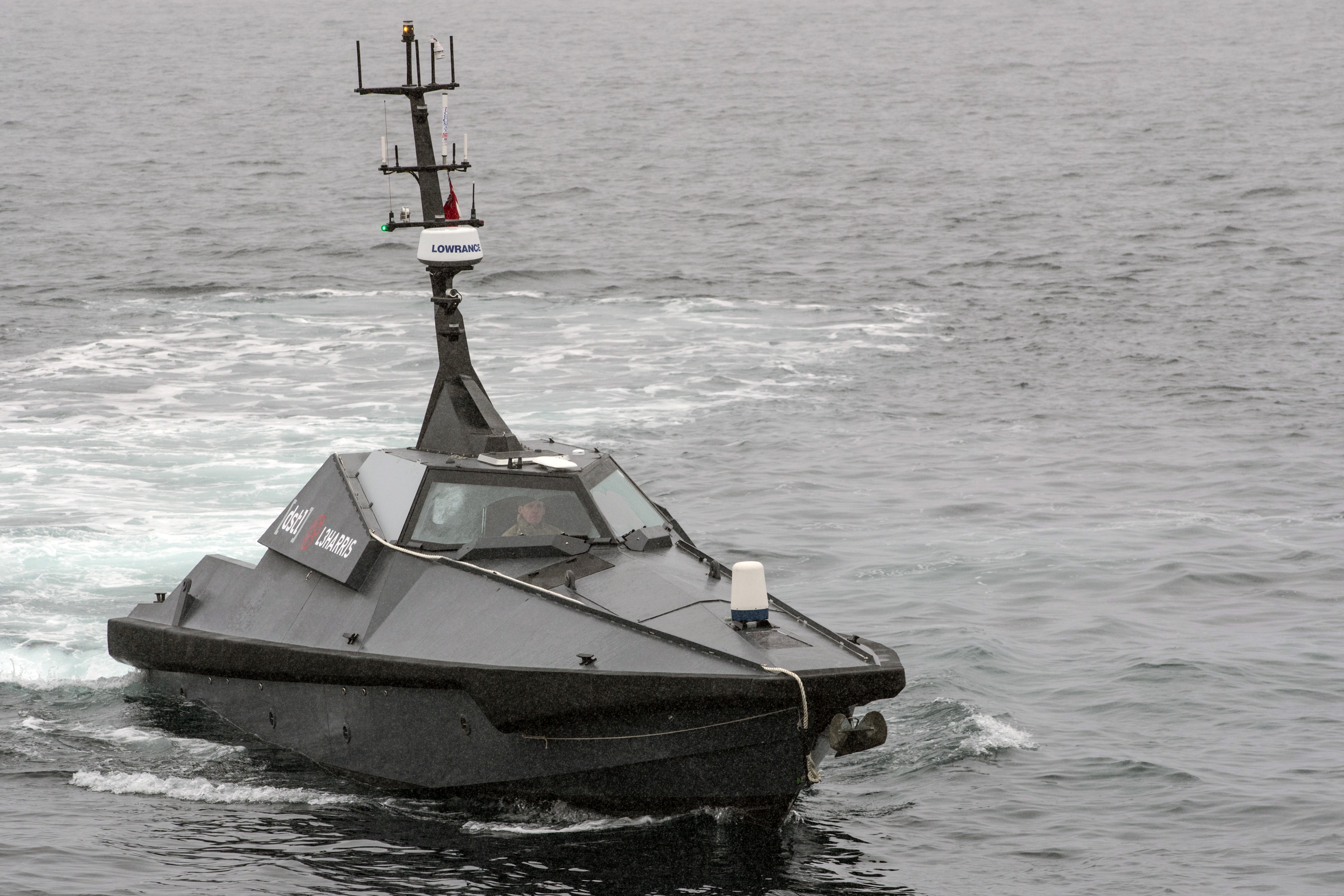
Madfox

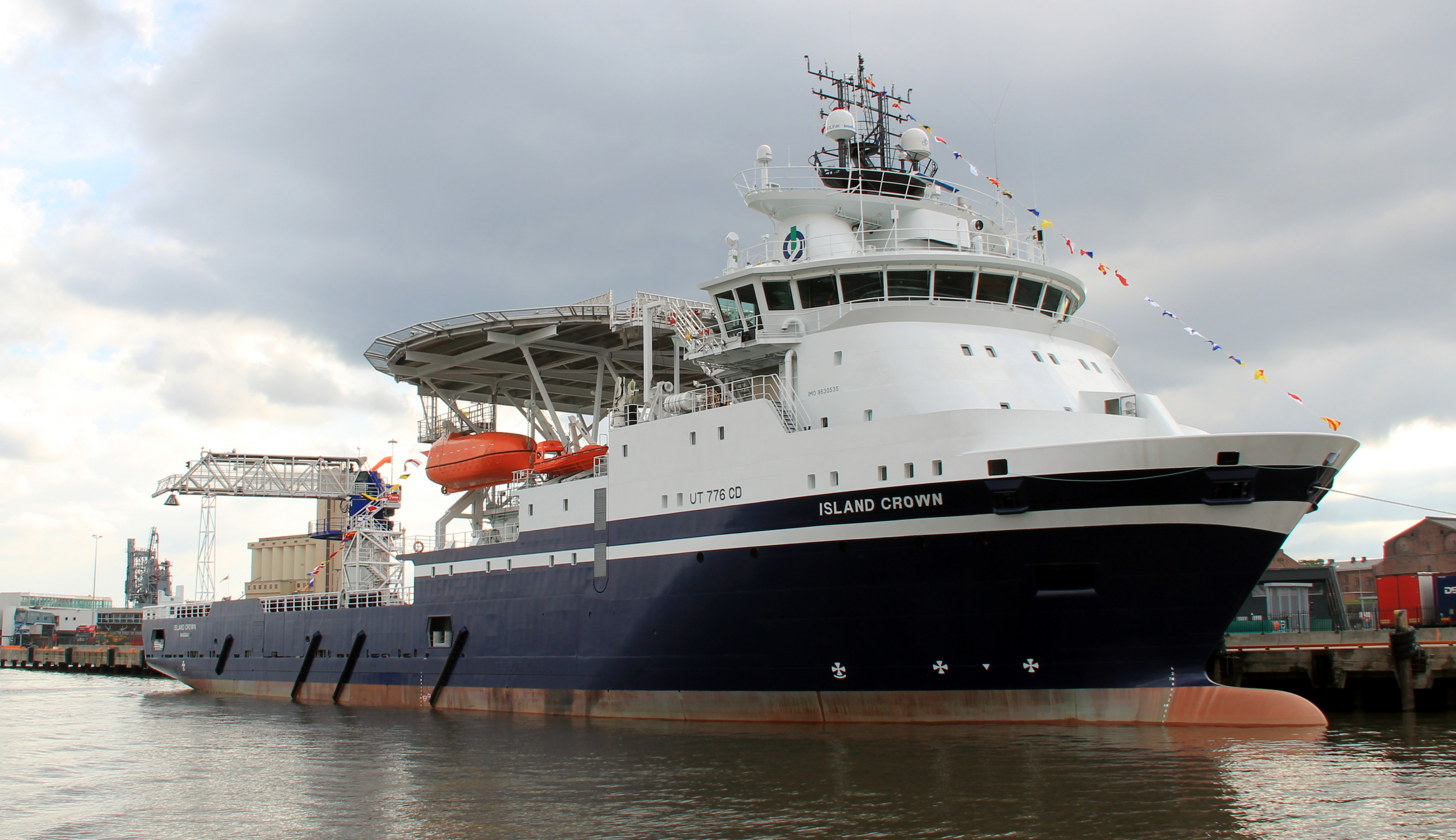
Stirling Castle

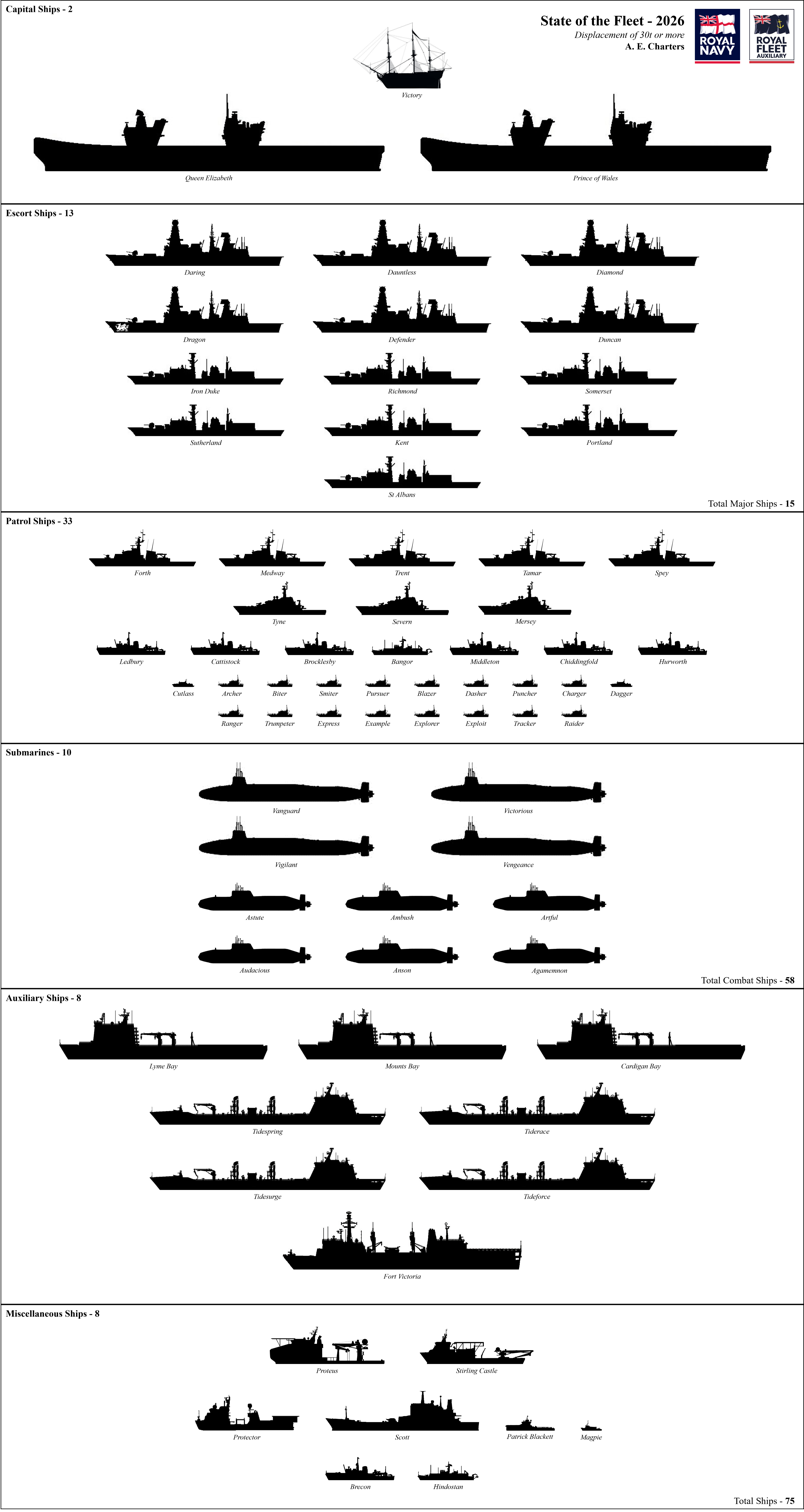
All ships currently in service in the Royal Navy and Royal Fleet Auxiliary shown to scale as silhouettes

== See also ==
Lists of ships operated by or in support of His Majesty's Naval Service

- List of active Royal Fleet Auxiliary ships
- List of active Royal Marines military watercraft
- List of ships of Serco Marine Services

Related articles

- List of Royal Navy shore establishments (the "stone frigates")
- List of ship names of the Royal Navy
- Active Royal Navy weapon systems
- Future of the Royal Navy
- Standing Royal Navy deployments
