= XV Madfox =

Experimental vessel of the Royal Navy

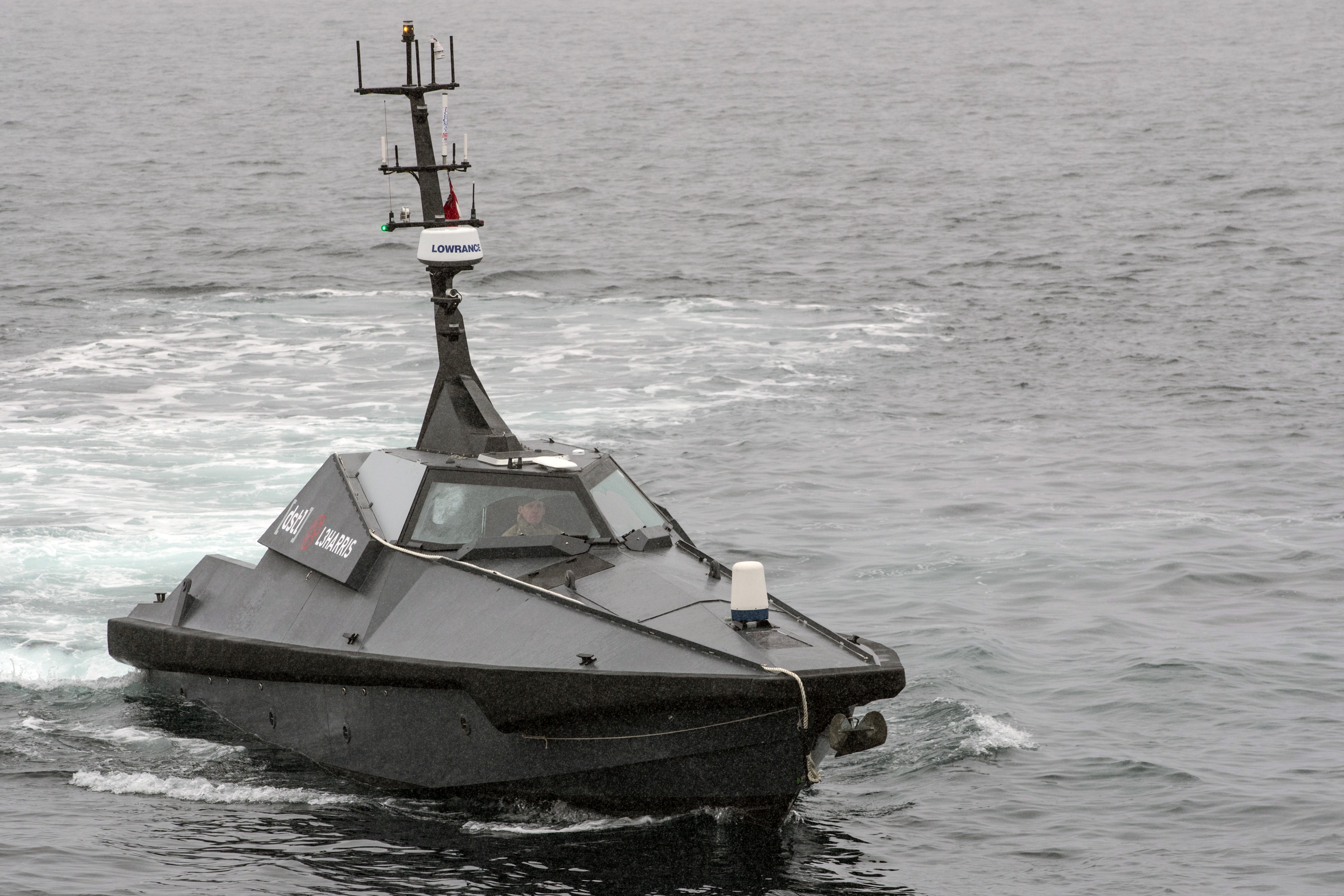

History

United Kingdom
- Namesake: Maritime Demonstrator For Operational eXperimentation
- Owner: Royal Navy
- Operator: NavyX
- Builder: L3Harris Technologies
- Completed: March 2021
- Home port: HMNB Portsmouth
- Identification: MMSI: 232030846, Callsign: MIGF9
- Status: Active

General characteristics
- Class & type: MAST-13
- Length: 13 m (42 ft 8 in)
- Propulsion: 2 × Cummins diesel engines; waterjets
- Speed: 40 kn (74 km/h; 46 mph)
- Complement: Uncrewed
- Sensors & processing systems: High-resolution EO/IR camera; Radar
- Armament: Optional loitering munitions (e.g., Switchblade)

XV MADFOX (short for Maritime Demonstrator For Operational eXperimentation) is an experimental autonomous surface vessel used by the Royal Navy. She is used as a testbed for new technologies, including unmanned underwater vehicles, unmanned surface vehicles and quantum navigation.

== Construction ==
MADFOX originated from a collaboration between the Defence Science and Technology Laboratory and L3Harris Technologies to create a high-speed autonomous testbed. The vessel was based on the MAST-13 design, which has been developed and refined over an 18-month period of trials and testing. MADFOX was first showcased at the DSEI 2019 exhibition in London.

In early 2021 she was selected for transition from a research project to an operational demonstrator for the Royal Navy. On 26 March 2021 the craft was formally handed over to NavyX, the Royal Navy's autonomy and lethal innovation team. She was delivered to HMNB Portsmouth and officially named MADFOX after.

== Characteristics ==
MADFOX is a 13-metre (43 ft) autonomous surface vessel based on the MAST-13 design by L3Harris Technologies. The vessel features a low-profile, high-speed hull form designed to reduce its radar cross-section and is finished in a dark grey tactical livery. It is powered by twin Cummins diesel engines and waterjets, which give her a top speed in excess of 40 kn (74 km/h; 46 mph).

The vessel purpose is remote or fully autonomous operation. She is equipped with a sensor suite for situational awareness, which includes a maritime radar and a mast-mounted Electro-Optical/Infrared camera. MADFOX also has the ASView control system installed, which allows it to be operated from either a portable ground control station or a parent vessel. She also has a modular payload area capable of carrying various mission-specific equipment. In 2021 the vessel was modified to carry and deploy loitering munitions, specifically the AeroVironment Switchblade.

== Operational History ==
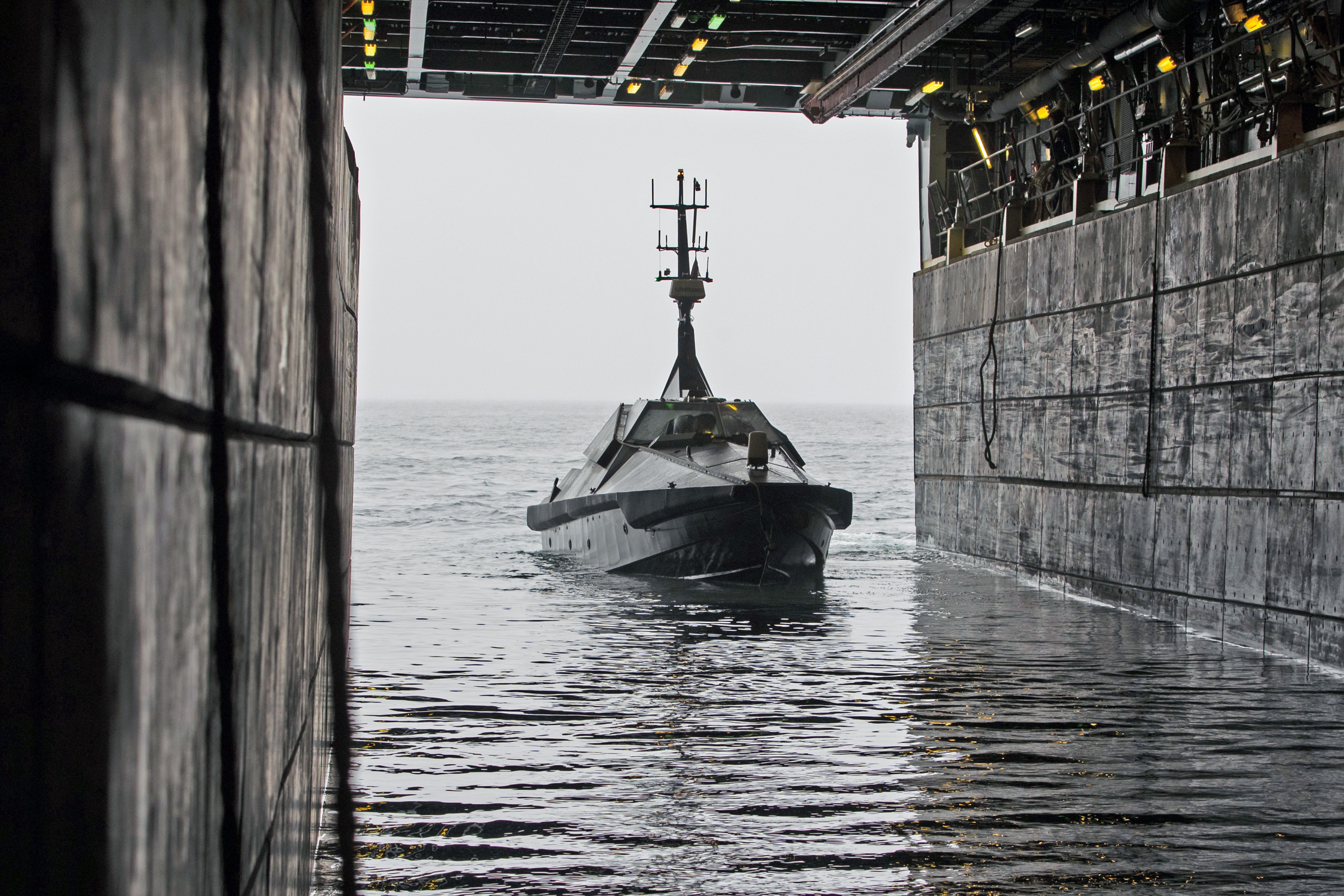
MADFOX entering the loading dock of HMS Albion

Following its delivery to NavyX in March 2021 MADFOX began a series of trials to assess her safety. Her initial testing focused on harbour operations and high-speed navigation in the Solent, both of which proved successful.

In October 2021, she was deployed to Portugal to participate in the NATO REPMUS exercise. During this deployment MADFOX successfully conducted the first remote launch of a missile by a Royal Navy USV.

The vessel has since been used to evaluate how autonomous platforms can support the Type 26 and Type 31 frigate programmes. These trials have included testing the integration of USVs with the Navy's Maple command-and-control software and exploring roles such as surveillance, force protection for anchored warships, and the detection of underwater threats. Currently, the vessel remains stationed at HMNB Portsmouth.

== See Also ==
- XV Patrick Blackett
- Project Cetus
- List of active Royal Navy ships
