= Picket boat =

Type of small naval craft

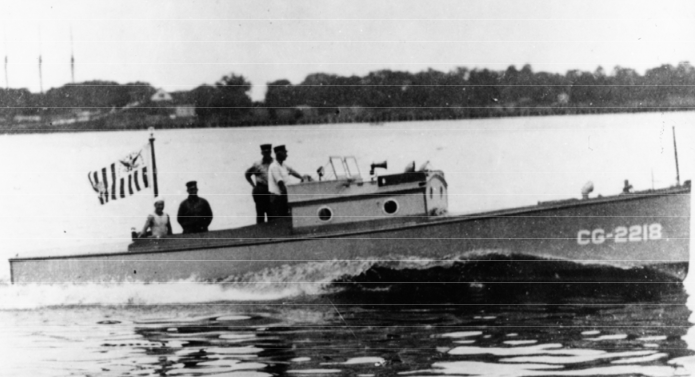
US Coast Guard 36-foot (11 m) open cockpit picket boat of the 1920s

A picket boat is a type of small naval craft. These are used for harbor patrol and other close inshore work, and have often been carried by larger warships as a ship's boat. They are usually 30 to 55 feet long.

Patrol boats, or any craft engaged in sentinel duty, are sometimes referred to as picket boats, using "picket" in the generic sense, even if much larger than actual picket boats. Picket boats were indeed at first steam pinnaces deployed to patrol anchorages to protect them from enemy torpedo boats, thus acquiring the new name "picket boat".

== United States ==
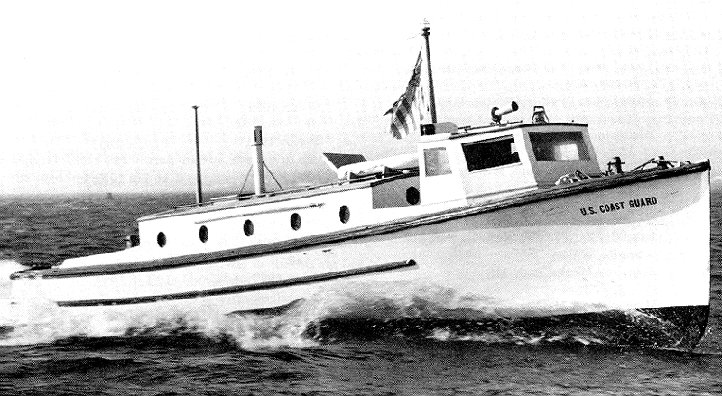
38-foot United States Coast Guard Picket boat

The Union's 45-foot (14 m) long steam-powered Picket Boat Number One sank the Confederate ironclad Albemarle in 1864. (Although named "Picket Boat", this craft has also been called a steam launch). The boat was armed with a 12-pounder Dahlgren gun and a spar torpedo, of which the latter was employed in sinking Albemarle. The Union's Potomac Flotilla also purchased and equipped some vessels to serve as picket boats, such as the USS Alpha and five other similar vessels on June 3,1864.

A number of American warships of the 19th century carried picket boats, such as the USS Vulcan (her picket boat was heavily engaged by Spanish small-caliber shore fire during one incident in the Spanish–American War), and others.

In the early 1920s, during Prohibition, the United States Coast Guard built a fleet of 103 picket boats to intercept rum runners, supplementing the larger and more seaworthy cutters and patrol boats. These boats were about 36 feet (11 m) long, had no main fixed armament, and cost about US$8,800 (about $161,459 in 2024 dollars) to build.

A later picket boat, built between 1932 and 1943, was 38 feet (12 m) long and also had no large main armament.

== Britain ==
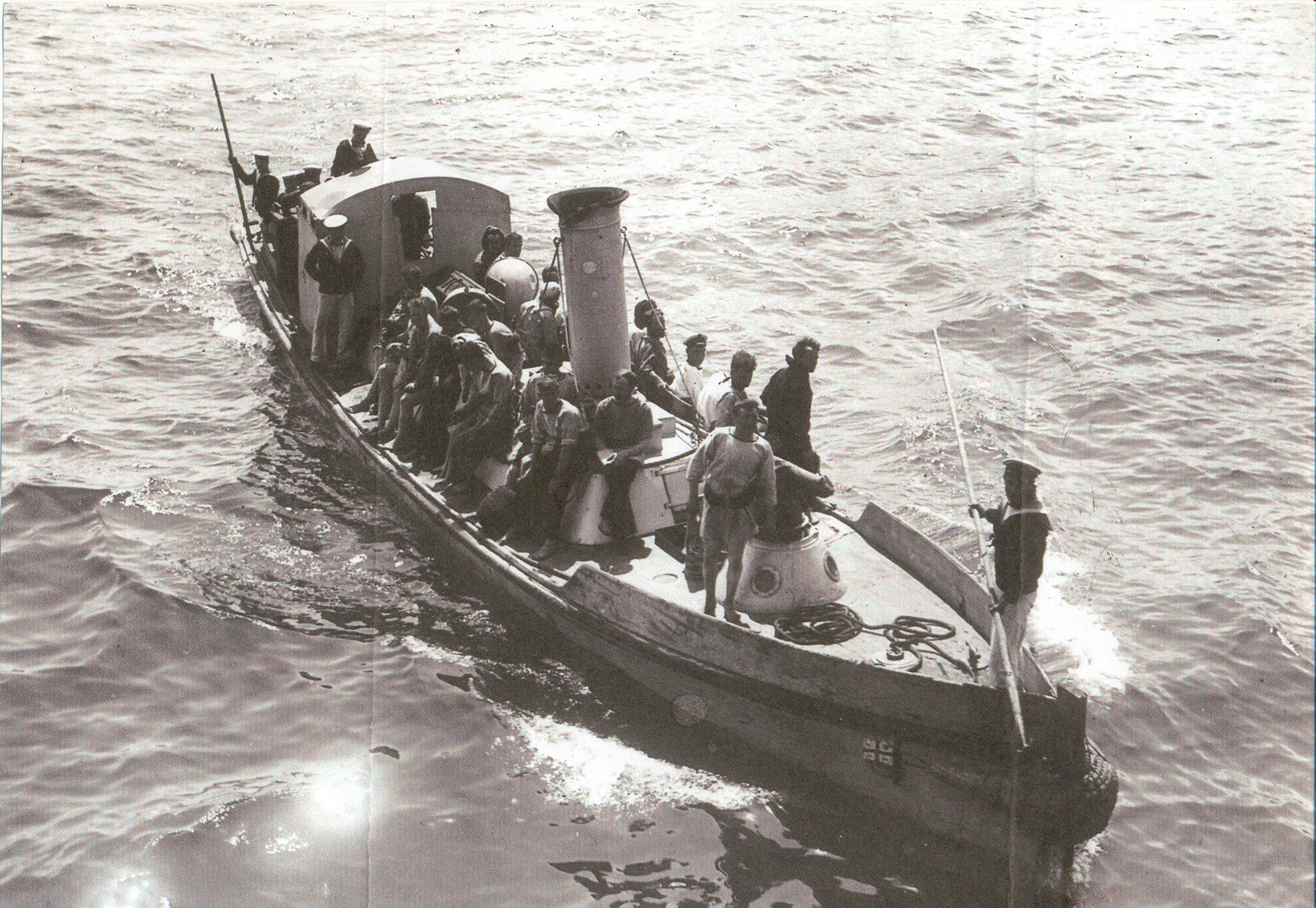
A British 56-foot (17 m) picket boat, returning to its mothership (HMS Triumph) after participating in action on April 18, 1915

A long-serving 19th-century British picket boat, carried on capital ships, was a 50-foot (15 m) model introduced in 1867 which saw wide service in World War I and even some limited service in World War II. The typical main armament during most of this boat's service life was a Hotchkiss 3–pounder, adopted by the Royal Navy in 1886.

British pre-dreadnoughts, including HMS Majestic and HMS Triumph, carried picket boats.

The P1000 Class Picket Boat is a current British Royal Navy boat, 42 feet (13 m) in length, formerly carried on destroyers but now used only for training.

== Germany ==
The Königsberg–class cruisers of 1905 and 1915 carried a picket boat; the Königsbergs of 1927 carried two. The Dresden class of a similar era carried one, as did the Wiesbaden–class.

Larger ships also carried picket boats: The Nassau–, König–, and Bayern–class battleships, the SMS Seydlitz, and the Derfflinger–class battlecruisers all carried one each.

== See also ==
- Launch, a type which overlaps somewhat with picket boats
- Radar picket, a larger ship or submarine, used to extend the range of radar coverage.
- Crash boats of World War 2
- Wooden boats of World War 2
