= RNMB Hussar =

Autonomous minesweeper of the Royal Navy

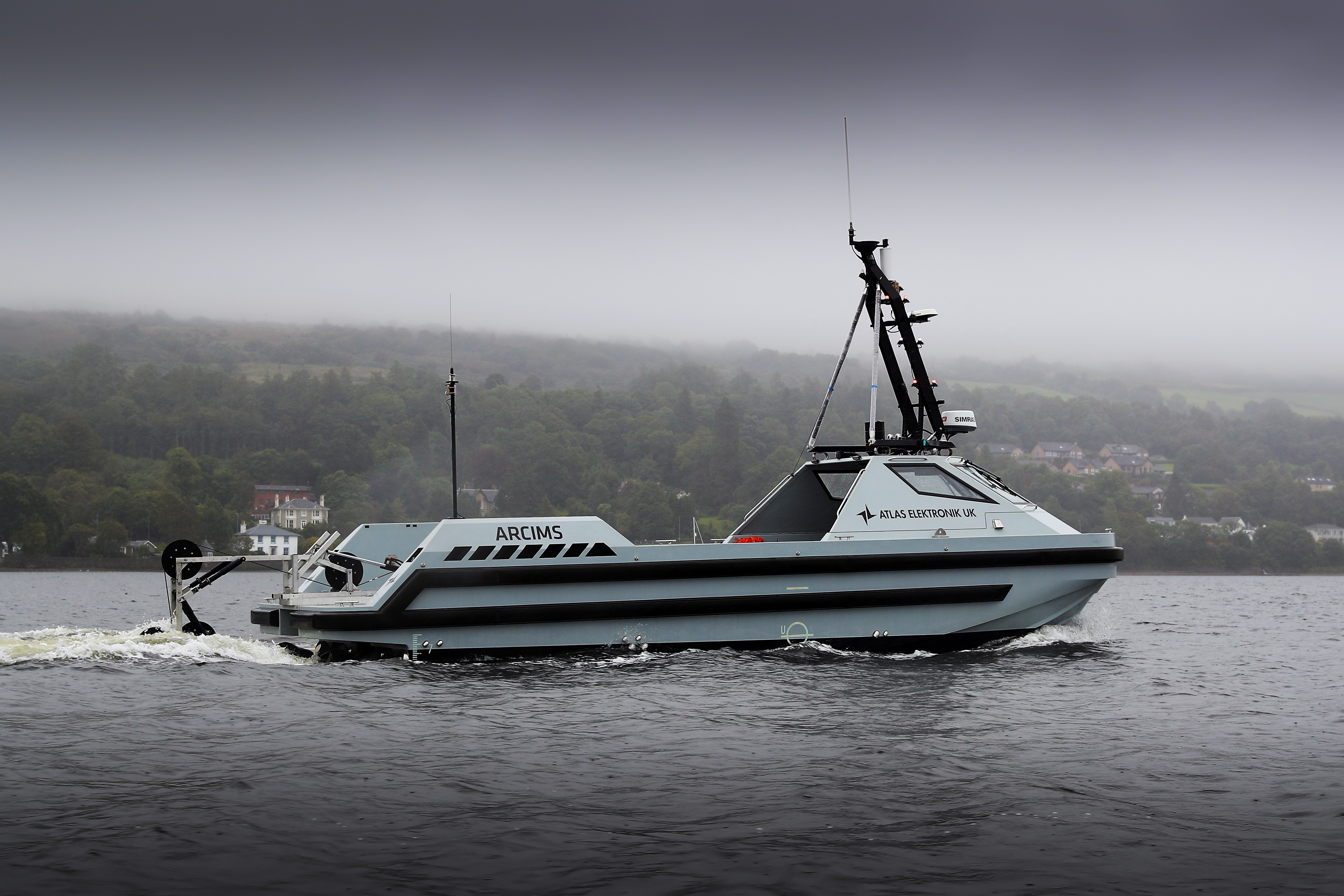

History

United Kingdom
- Name: Hussar
- Namesake: Hussar
- Owner: Ministry of Defence
- Operator: Royal Navy
- Builder: Atlas Elektronik UK (AEUK)
- Cost: £13 million
- Completed: May 2018
- In service: June 2018
- Home port: HMNB Portsmouth
- Identification: Pennant number: H01
- Status: Active

General characteristics
- Class & type: Sea-class workboat (Arcims-class)
- Displacement: 10 t (9.8 long tons)
- Length: 11 m (36 ft 1 in)
- Propulsion: Yanmar diesel engines; twin waterjets
- Speed: In excess of 40 kn (74 km/h; 46 mph) (transit); Up to 15 kn (28 km/h; 17 mph) (sweeping)
- Complement: Unmanned (can be crewed by 2)
- Sensors & processing systems: Navigation radar, day/thermal cameras, line-of-sight communications suite

RNMB Hussar is an autonomous minesweeper of the Royal Navy. Built in 2018, she was the first autonomous minesweeper in the Royal Navy, designed to locate and neutralise naval mines without the risk of human harm.

Development of Hussar began in 2014, although she was not built until May 2018. The vessel was originally designed and constructed by Atlas Elektronik UK in Dorset, England, at a cost of £13 million pounds. She uses a self-driving launch to tow three smaller boats, which carry acoustic, magnetic and electrical devices that are able to detonate naval mines from a safe distance. The 11-metre (36 ft) long USV completed sea trials off the Dorset coast in May 2018 and was placed into service shortly after.

In February 2020, Hussar underwent cold water sea trials in Canada to test how the new class of vessel functioned in cold water temperatures.

Hussar's homeport is HMNB Clyde.

== See also ==
- List of active Royal Navy ships
