= HMS Cromer (M103) =

Sandown-class minehunter

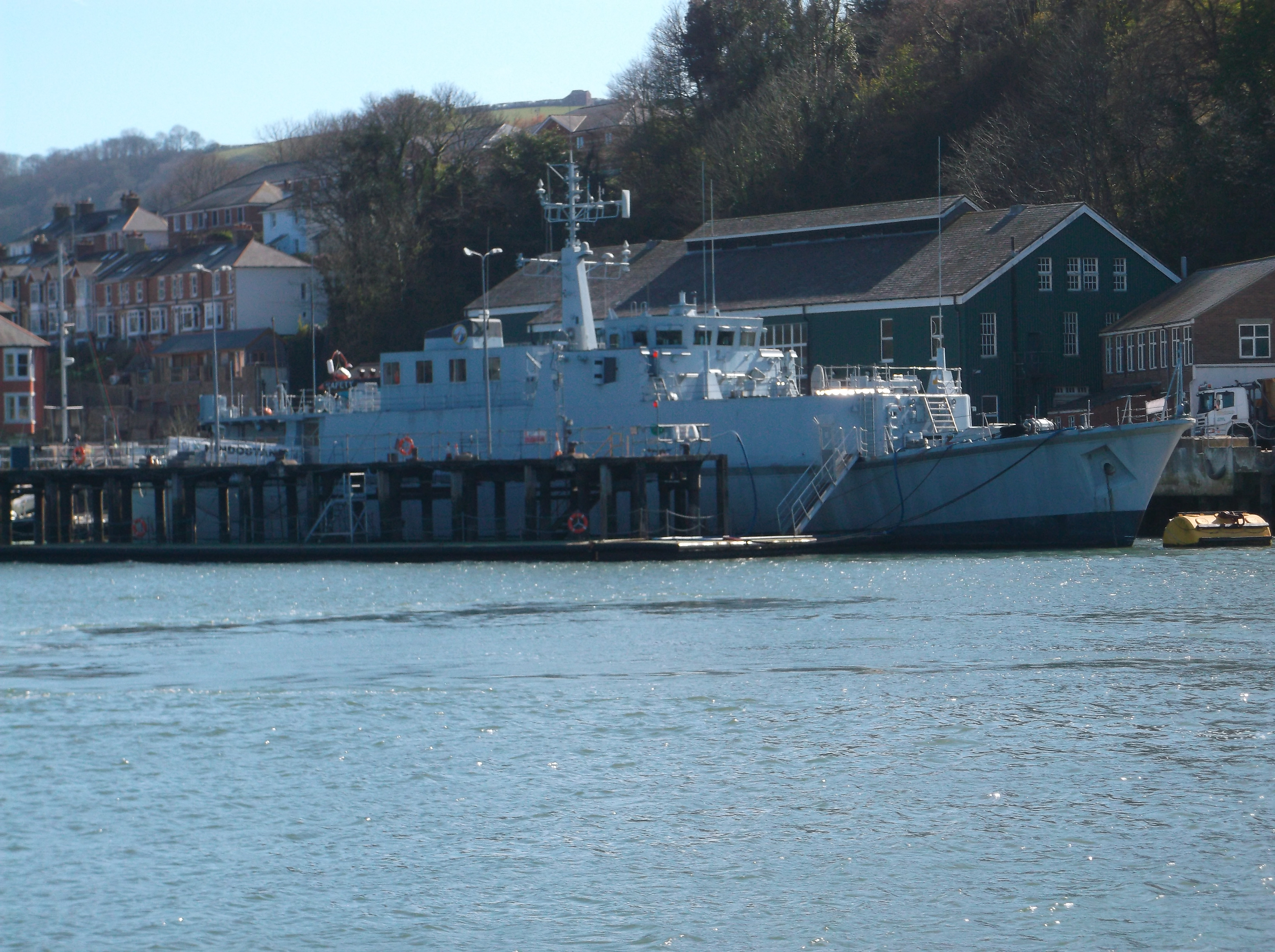
- HMS Cromer, after decommissioning, at Britannia Royal Naval College

History

United Kingdom
- Name: Cromer
- Namesake: Cromer, Norfolk
- Builder: Vosper Thornycroft
- Launched: 6 October 1990
- Commissioned: 7 April 1992
- Decommissioned: 2001
- Renamed: Hindostan in 2001
- Identification: Pennant number: M103
- Status: Training ship

General characteristics
- Class & type: Sandown-class minehunter
- Displacement: 484 tons full
- Length: 52.5 m (172 ft 3 in)
- Beam: 10.9 m (35 ft 9 in)
- Draught: 2.3 m (7 ft 7 in)
- Propulsion: 2 shafts Voith-Schneider propulsors; diesel-electric drive; Paxman Valenta diesels, 1,500 shp (1,100 kW)
- Speed: 13 knots (24 km/h; 15 mph) diesel; 6.5 knots (12.0 km/h; 7.5 mph) electric
- Complement: 34 (7 officers, 27 ratings)
- Sensors & processing systems: Type 1007 navigation radar; Type 2093 variable-depth mine hunting sonar
- Armament: 1 × Oerlikon 30 mm KCB gun on DS-30B mount; 2 × 7.62 mm L7 GPMG machine guns; Wallop Defence Systems Barricade Mk. III countermeasure launchers; Irvin Aerospace Replica decoy launchers
- Notes: Mine counter measures equipment: 2 × ECA PAP 104 Mk.5 remotely controlled submarines (ROV); ECA mine disposal system; Clearance divers

HMS Cromer is a former Sandown-class minehunter commissioned by the Royal Navy in 1992. She was named after the North Norfolk seaside town of the same name.

HMS Cromer visited Dundee on 6–9 November 1998 (for a Dundee navy day and Armistice Day commemorations) when she was accompanied by various warships from European countries including: Norwegian minelayer/command ship HNoMS Vidar, Norwegian minesweeper HNoMS Måløy, Dutch minehunter HNLMS Schiedam, Belgian minehunter Crocus, Type 23 frigate HMS Montrose and German minesweeper Völkingen.

She was decommissioned in 2001 before being refitted for use as a training ship at the Britannia Royal Naval College at Dartmouth. In keeping with tradition, for this role the ship has been renamed Hindostan. As she is not a commissioned ship she is not prefixed "HMS". In June 2023, she was towed to Portsmouth reportedly for temporary berthing while jetties at Britannia Royal Naval College were refurbished.
