= P1000-class picket boat =

Twin screw boat

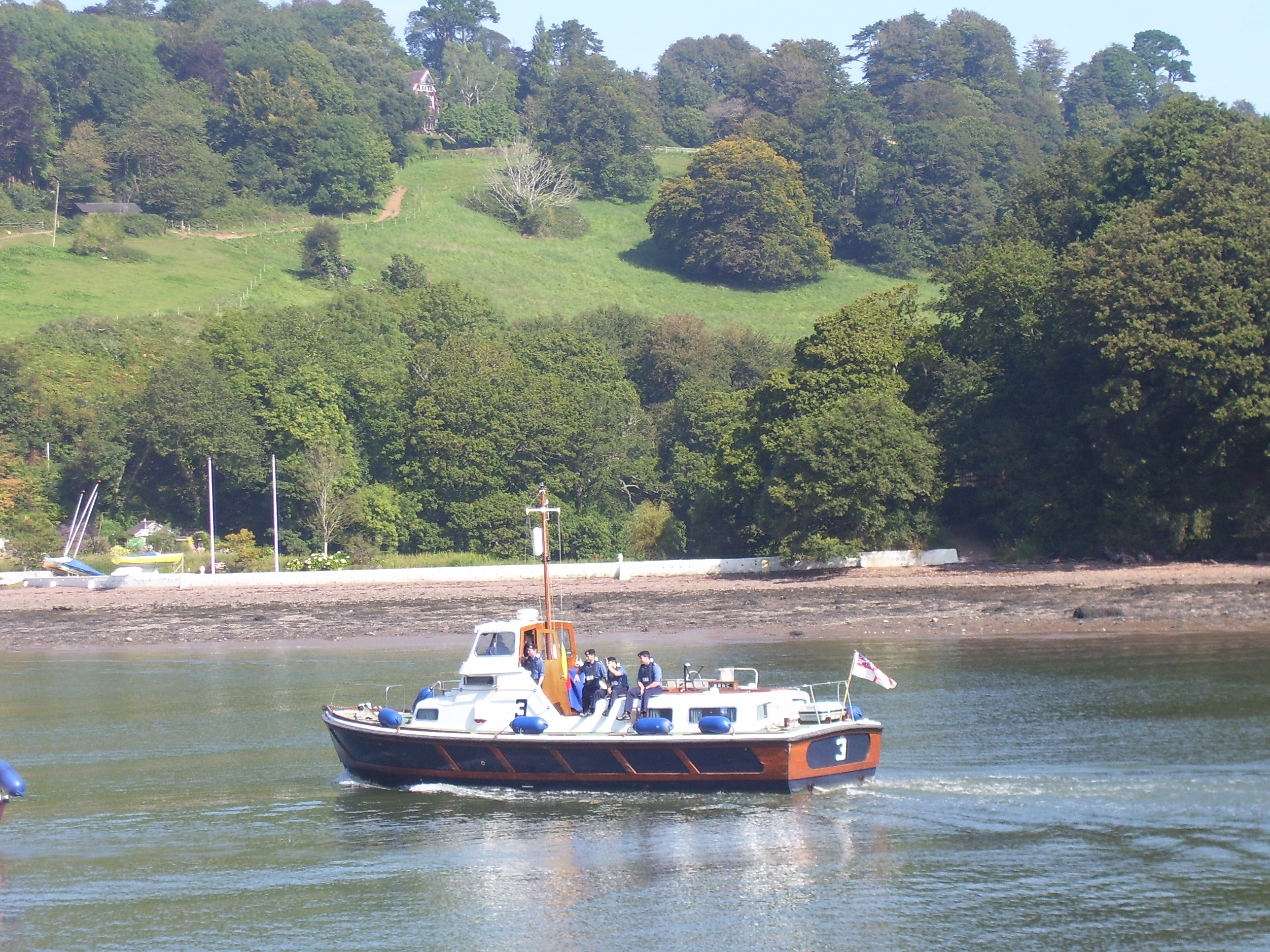
- BRNC picket boat on the River Dart

Class overview
- Name: Picket boat
- Operators: (United Kingdom) Royal Navy
- Succeeded by: Sea-class workboat

General characteristics
- Type: Patrol / training vessels
- Length: 12.8
- Propulsion: 2 shafts
- Complement: 5

The picket boat of the Royal Navy, (also sometimes called a P1000) was a twin screw boat in use at Britannia Royal Naval College in Dartmouth primarily to train officer cadets in boat handling and seamanship.

== History ==
Although these boats were once carried on Royal Navy destroyers and above, they came to serve at the college in Dartmouth and could be seen flying the White Ensign or the Blue Ensign regularly on the River Dart and near the coast close to Start Point.

The significance of the colour of the ensigns was based on the use of the vessel, but generally when the vessel was on official Royal Navy business through the training of officer cadets then it flew the White Ensign; when crewed by the Royal Fleet Auxiliary, it flew the Blue Ensign.

Prince William trained on picket boats as part of his officer training at Dartmouth, which he undertook from June, 2008.

Picket boats took their place in history once again by falling into place on the River Thames for the Jubilee River Pageant in 2012. On this occasion the crews were commanded by Officers on the Initial Warfare Officer Foundation Course (IWOF) at Dartmouth, and crewed by officer cadets from Lancaster Division, undergoing initial naval training.

Eight "Sea Class 15" work boats by ATLAS Elektronik UK (AEUK) were ordered replace the picket boats from autumn 2020. The first new boat was delivered in November 2020.

== See also ==
- Archer-class patrol vessel
- CB90-class fast assault craft
- Patrol Craft Fast - the "Swift Boats"
- Scimitar-class patrol vessel
