= Sea-class workboat =

Twin screw boat

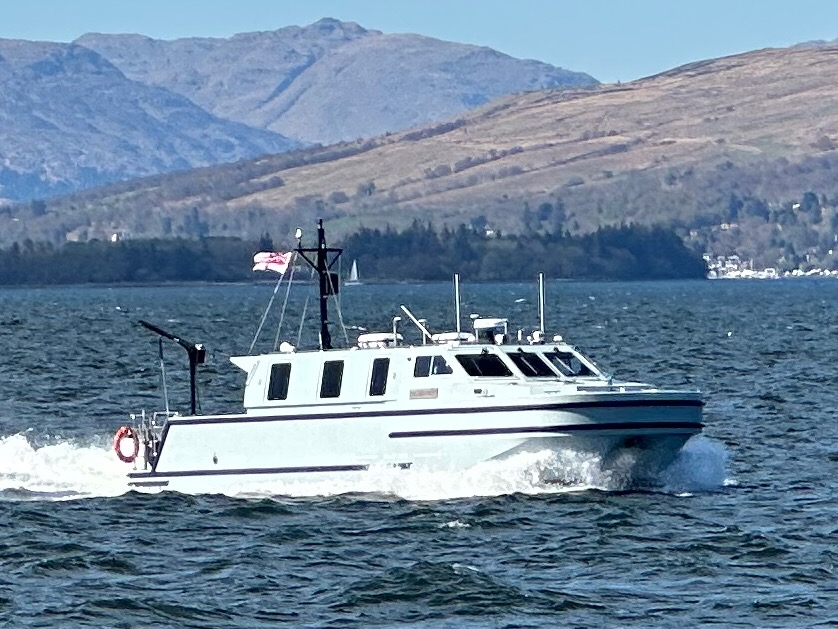
- SMB-03 (Sea class 15 m with survey module)

Class overview
- Name: Sea class
- Operators: (United Kingdom) Royal Navy
- Built: 2017–2024
- In service: 2018–present
- Completed: 35 + 7 (Arcims-class) minehunting variants
- Active: 35 + 7

General characteristics
- Type: Workboat/training/diver support/survey/minehunting vessels
- Displacement: 15 to 23 t (15 to 23 long tons) (11-15 m Workboat variants); 37 t (36 long tons) (HMS Magpie)
- Length: 11 m (36 ft 1 in); 13.8 m (45 ft 3 in); 15 m (49 ft 3 in); 18 m (59 ft 1 in)
- Propulsion: Yanmar diesels; twin waterjets
- Speed: up to 40 knots (74 km/h; 46 mph)
- Boats & landing craft carried: Remus UUV (11, 15 & 18 m survey modules); SeaCat UUVs (Arcims-class variants)
- Complement: 2 berths (11 m variants), 4 berths (13.8 & 15 m variants), up to 9 crew (HMS Magpie); up to 36 passengers (13.8 m variant); up to 12 cadets (15 m officer training variants)

The Sea-class workboat has been procured for Britain's Royal Navy to undertake a number of roles under its Project Vahana programme, with removable specialised modules including: logistics and transport tasks, inshore and harbour survey work, diver training and support, officer training and providing passenger transfer modules for the aircraft carrier HMS Prince of Wales. The design was developed from an autonomous minehunting prototype which has also been procured, becoming part of the class.

A procurement contract for £48M was awarded to Atlas Elektronik UK (AEUK) in September 2017 for the delivery of up to 38 vessels under the programme. Thirty-five vessels were ultimately built, with deliveries beginning in 2018 and completing in 2024. Only HMS Magpie (the largest boat in the series) is formally a commissioned warship of the Navy. The remaining boats are not technically commissioned warships.

== Development ==
Remote controlled minesweeping was not a new idea; in 2003 during Operation Telic in Iraq. Atlas Elektronik UK Ltd developed their ARCIMS (Atlas Remote Capability Integrated Mission Suite) mission system which has several coil auxiliary boats (CABs), to emit signals detonating mines, towed behind an autonomous unmanned surface vessel (USV). The system was demonstrated successfully at DSEI 2013, using a purpose built 11 metre USV (which was later named Hussar) and two systems were exported to an overseas navy. In May 2015 Atlas were awarded a £13 million MOD contract to supply this autonomous minesweeping capability, including four USVs, to the Royal Navy, in partnership with Babcock, to be integrated by BAE SYSTEMS with their NAUTIS command system.

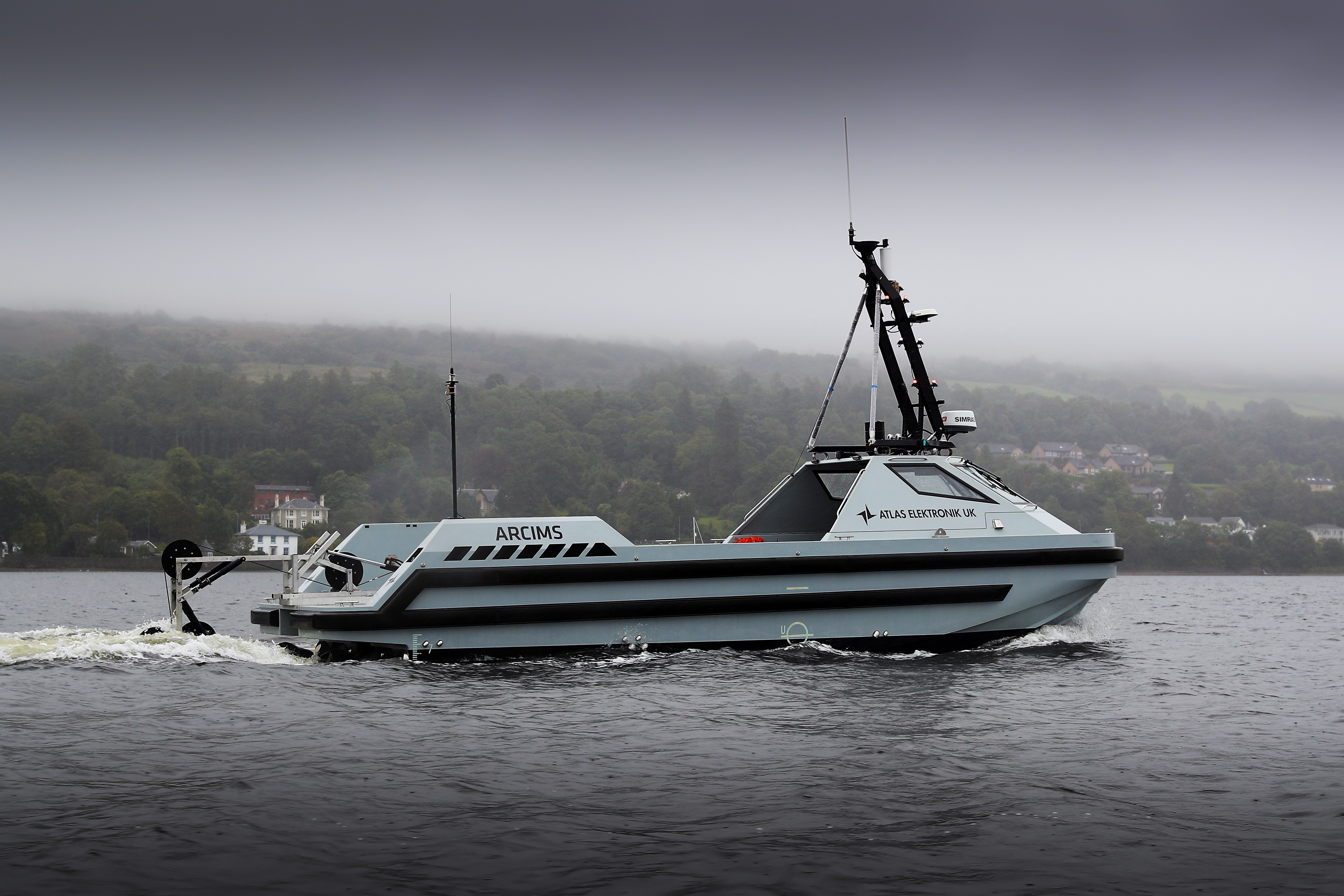
RNMB Hussar (Arcims-class) on the Clyde in 2019

The navy planned Project Vahana to replace small vessels with a unified system, and in September 2017 announced that Atlas Elektronik UK (AEUK) had won this £48M contract for up to 38 SEA class vessels, fully fitted out with a standard hull form (derived from the ARCIMS design) in 11m, 13m, and 15m lengths, and mission equipment modu[es, which can be interchanged. In addition, the 18m launch HMS Magpie was built by another shipyard to a proven design, then fitted out by Atlas with survey modules. Atlas Elektronik delivered the ARCIMS system together with the first tested autonomous vessel, RNMB Hussar, and a manned version named RNMB Hazard. After successful trials off Dorset, they were handed over to the Royal Navy at the start of May 2018, as was HMS Magpie.

== Vessel types and roles ==
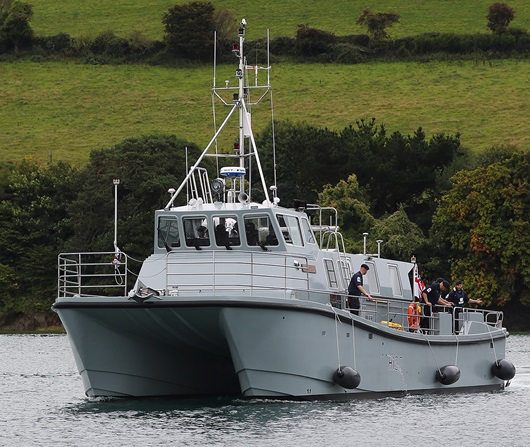
HMS Magpie (Sea class 18 m variant)

The Sea-class workboat has standard hulls with modules that are interchangeable, allowing the vessels to adapted for different tasks. As initially acquired, the class includes several variants:

- 10 × 11 m standard workboats for transport and logistics tasks;
- 3 × 11 m small survey modules assigned to the Hydrographic Exploitation Group based out of HMNB Devonport;
- 3 × 13.8 m passenger transfer modules (assigned to HMS Prince of Wales);
- 18 × 15 m workboats for officer training, diver training/support and survey/hydrography duties; and,
- 1 × 18 m inshore survey unit (HMS Magpie).

Eight 15-metre officer training vessels are assigned to the Britannia Royal Naval College, while the six 15-metre diver training and support vessels are assigned to HMNB Portsmouth (three units), HMNB Devonport, HMNB Clyde and to the Royal Navy's Gibraltar Squadron (one unit each). Three of the 15-metre vessels are configured for survey/hydrographic work, with one of the vessels (Salamander) being based with the Hydrographic Exploitation Group in HMNB Devonport.

The vessels have been constructed to be fully compatible with AEUK’s autonomy engine enabling an unmanned capability to be integrated as a future need arises.

=== Autonomous minehunting/sweeping ===
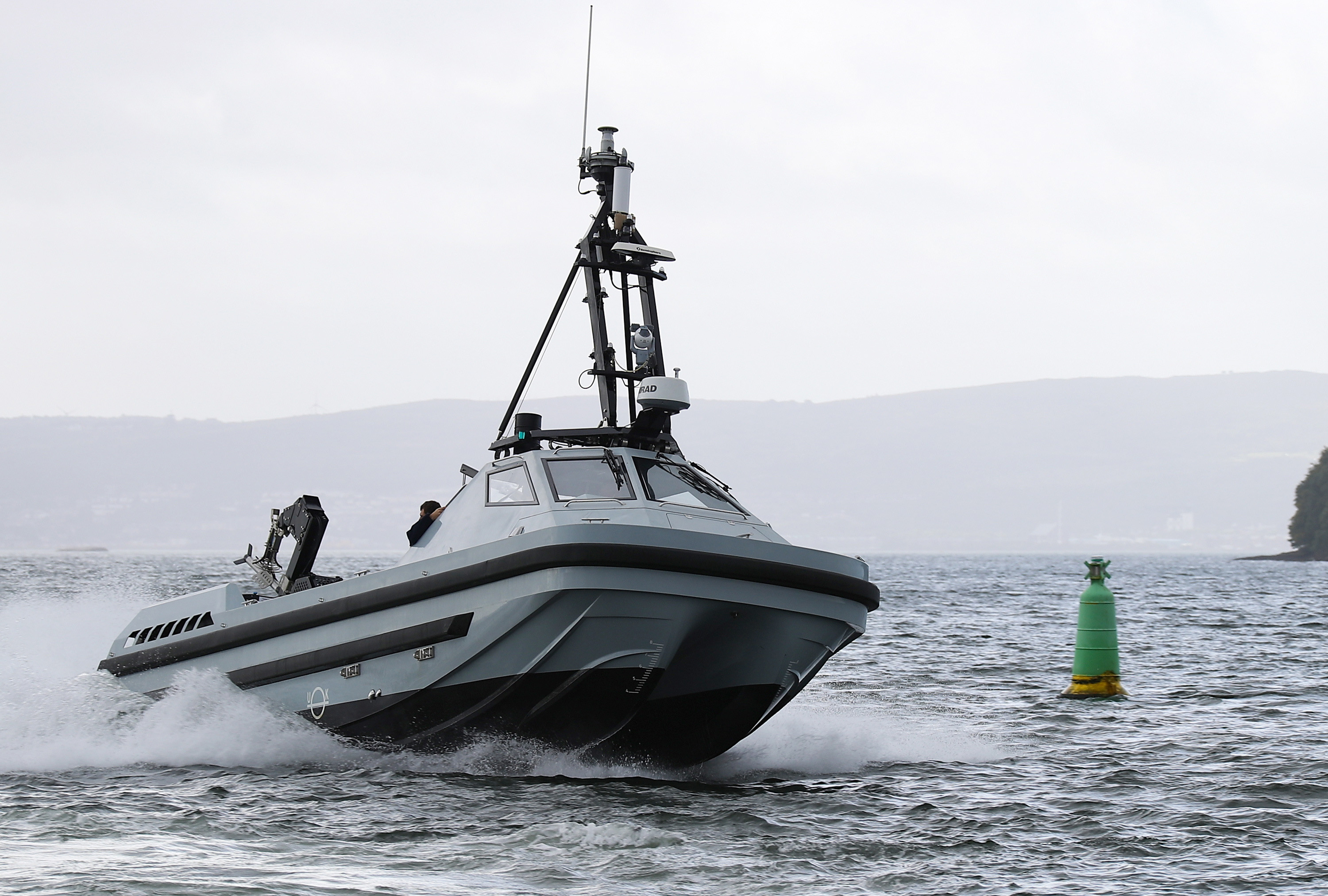
RNMB Harrier (Arcims-class)

A specifically-focused autonomous minehunting vessel, also produced by Atlas Elektronik, preceded the class (being identified by the Navy as the Arcims-class). Six 11-metre variants of the type (RNMBs Hussar, Hazard, Halcyon, Harrier, Hellcat and Hydra) were acquired by the Royal Navy and assigned to the Mine Threat and Exploitation Group at HMNB Clyde. The vessels have been procured under the Mine Hydrographic Capability (MHC) programme and are fitted with acoustic, electronic, and magnetic payloads that can emit signals through two or three towed craft (Coil Auxiliary Boats (CABs)) to trigger mines into thinking that a target ship is passing by. The boats can operate crewed, be remotely controlled or be pre-programmed to conduct missions autonomously. The 11 m boats can be transported on either the RAF's A400M or C-17 transport aircraft. In 2025, three sets of this autonomous minesweeping capability (known as SWEEP) were officially incorporated into the Royal Navy's capabilities. Four vessels (Halcyon, Hussar, Hydra and Harrier) were enabled for autonomous/uncrewed operations. The other vessels have been employed as crewed workboats for route surveys in the U.K. and elsewhere, as well as for trials of small uncrewed underwater vehicles (UUVs).

An additional 15-metre minehunting variant (RNMB Hebe) was also procured and similarly assigned to the Clyde naval base. The greater size of Hebe permits her to accommodate a Portable Operations Centre Afloat that allows her to control her sister vessels while also coordinating autonomous operations.

In 2023, RNMB Harrier was tasked to undertake trials with the Royal Navy's 9th Mine Counter-Measures Squadron based at HMS Jufair in Bahrain. It is planned that autonomous minehunters, operating from command "mother ships", will incrementally supersede crewed minehunters operated by the Royal Navy.

== See also ==
- Archer-class patrol vessel
- P1000-class picket boat
- Patrol Craft Fast - the "Swift Boats"
- Cutlass-class patrol vessel
