= British Forces Gibraltar =

- British Armed Forces tri-service badge
- Active: April 1992 – present
- Country: United Kingdom
- Branch: Royal Navy; British Army; Royal Air Force
- Type: Joint tri-service command
- Role: Command of British military forces in Gibraltar
- Part of: Cyber & Specialist Operations Command
- Headquarters: The Tower, HMNB Gibraltar

Commanders
- Commander of British Forces Gibraltar: Commodore Tim Davey
- Commanding Officer, Royal Gibraltar Regiment: Lieutenant Colonel John Pitto MBE
- Commanding Officer, Gibraltar Squadron: Lieutenant Commander Lauren Webber
- Commander, RAF Gibraltar: Wing Commander Rob Hall

British Forces Gibraltar constitute those elements of the British Armed Forces stationed in the British overseas territory of Gibraltar. Gibraltar is used primarily as a training area, thanks to its good climate and rocky terrain, and as a stopover for aircraft and ships en route to and from deployments East of Suez or in Africa.

British Forces Gibraltar as a formation was established in mid-1992 after the last Royal Navy-lead commander, Rear Admiral Geoffrey Biggs, Flag Officer Gibraltar, hauled down his flag. Thereafter the new command took on a more tri-service character.

== History ==
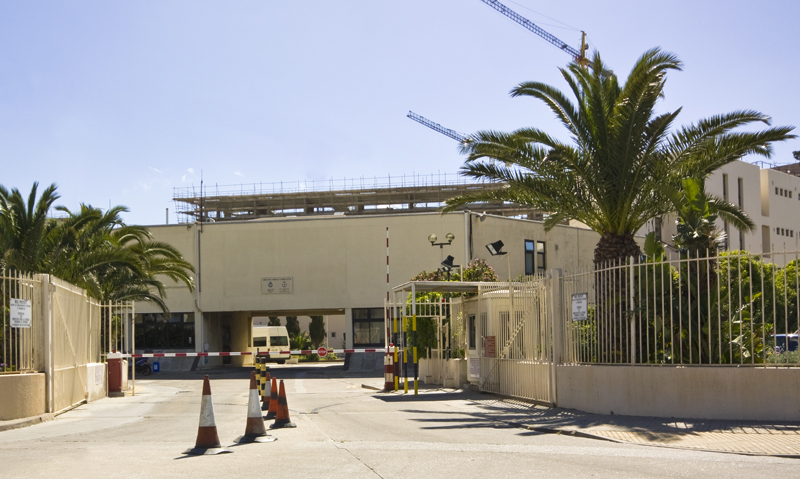
Entrance to HMS Rooke at Queensway, Gibraltar – former headquarters of Gibraltar Defence Police.

British Armed Forces in Gibraltar had been predominantly naval-led since the 1890s. In the 1950s discussions about the creation of NATO's Allied Forces Mediterranean led to the Flag Officer Gibraltar being placed in command of NATO forces in the area.

However, many years later, the British Royal Navy captain serving as Head of Sea Section in Operations Division, SHAPE, was to have to deal with the re-absorption of Spain into NATO in the early 1990s. Arranging the NATO-Spain-Gibraltar-UK linkages involved "delicate negotiations," but British plans, to Captain Peter Melson's knowledge "committed no forces to defence of the Strait, while Spain was willing to commit substantial elements of their ORBAT [order of battle, their armed forces]."

The last UK based army battalion, 3rd Battalion Royal Green Jackets, left Gibraltar in 1991 and the Royal Gibraltar Regiment took charge of local defence under the new headquarters British Forces Gibraltar.

== Command ==
The commander of British Forces Gibraltar is Commodore Tim Davey of the Royal Navy, who was appointed in June 2026.

British Forces Gibraltar is part of the UK Integrated Global Defence Network within Cyber & Specialist Operations Command, which is responsible for the command, direction and support of UK's overseas bases.

All MOD establishments in Gibraltar are operated by Cyber & Specialist Operations Command, with each of the separate armed forces using the facilities.

== Facilities ==
=== Devil's Tower Camp ===
The Royal Gibraltar Regiment of the British Army is based at Devil's Tower Camp. The regiment is a mixed infantry-focused unit, with 235 personnel as of 2023.

=== HM Dockyard, Gibraltar ===
HM Dockyard, Gibraltar was active from 1895 to 1984. The dockyard was used extensively by the Royal Navy, docking many of the Navy's most prestigious ships. In the early 1980s a decision by the United Kingdom's Ministry of Defence to cut back the Royal Navy surface fleet meant that the dockyard was no longer financially viable.

In 1984 the dockyard passed into the hands of the UK ship repair and conversion company, A&P Group. The takeover of the former naval dockyard at Gibraltar as "Gibrepair" in 1985 was short-lived, a victim of local social politics.

The current dockyard is still used by the Royal Navy and is referred to as 'His Majesty's Naval Base Gibraltar (HMNB Gibraltar)'.

The base is the permanent home to the Royal Navy's Gibraltar Squadron, equipped with two Cutlass-class patrol vessels and three Pacific 24 rigid inflatable boats. They are supported by diving platforms and harbour work boats. The offshore patrol vessel, HMS Trent, also deploys from the base from time-to-time. Gibraltar regularly hosts other British or allied warships and support vessels.

The Gibraltar Defence Police (GDP) has its headquarters at North Gate House, located within HMNB Gibraltar. GDP is a civilian police force which is part of the MOD. As of 2023 it had 100 officers. The GDP operates two patrol boats and rigid inflatable boats.

=== RAF Gibraltar ===
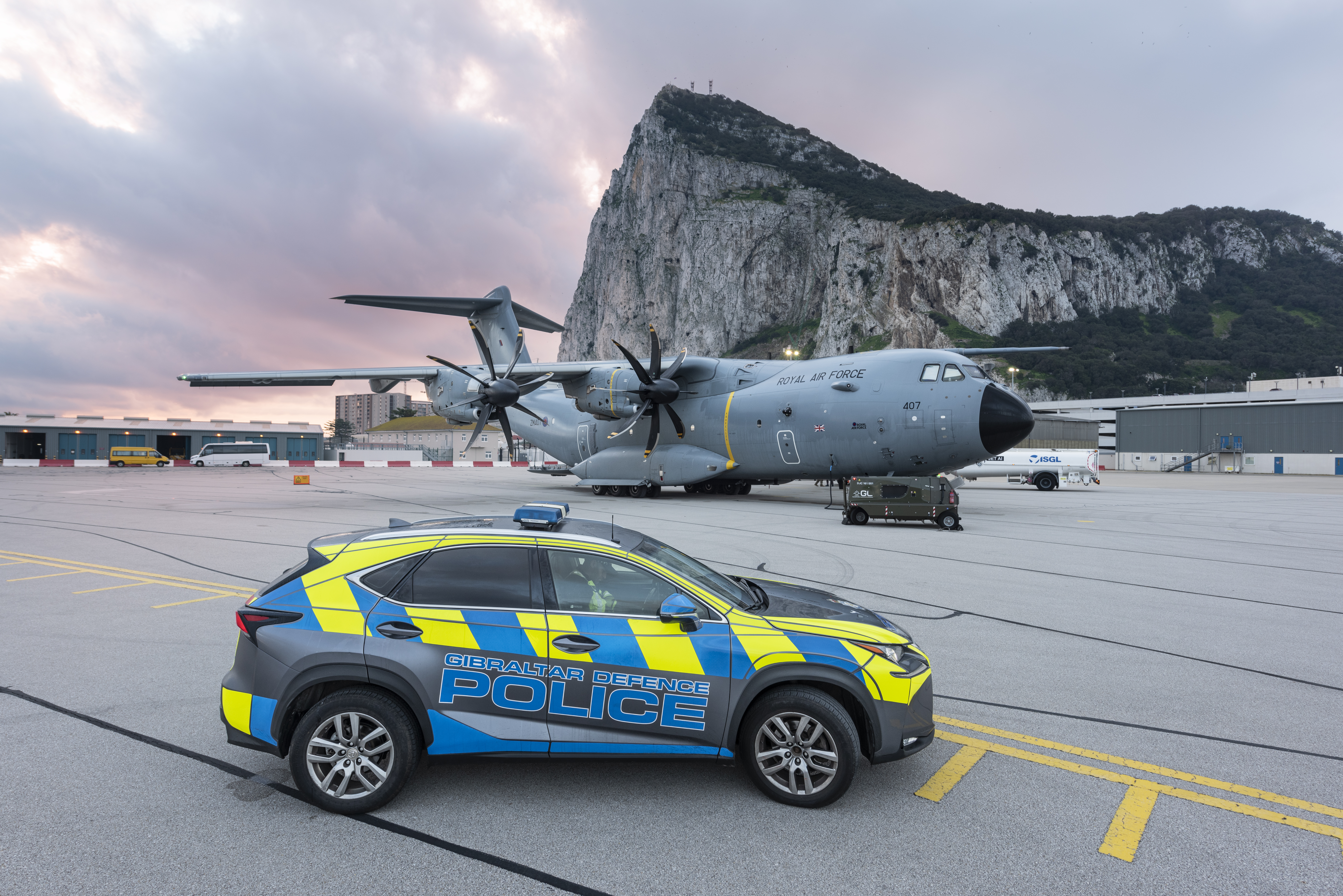
A Royal Air Force A400M Atlas C1 and Gibraltar Defence Police vehicle at RAF Gibraltar

RAF Gibraltar is a Royal Air Force station located at the northern end of the territory. Although no aircraft are based at the station, it is used to support operations in the region and for major NATO exercises. The airfield also serves as Gibraltar International Airport which operates a civilian passenger terminal on the northern side of the airfield. Winston Churchill Avenue, the four-lane road linking Gibraltar and Spain, crosses the airfield's runway and is closed to traffic each time an aircraft takes off or lands.

As of 2023, sixteen personnel are based at the station.

=== King’s Lines Oil Fuel Depot ===
The Kings Lines Oil Fuel Depot was built 1954 for the Royal Navy. The depot is located underground within the Rock of Gibraltar and had a capacity to store 250,000 tonnes of fuel. It has been unused for many years and in 2023 the MOD indicated that it intended on reopening the facility.

=== Windmill Hill ===
Windmill Hill located on at the southern end of the peninsula is home to the Buffadero Training Centre which is used by the Royal Gibraltar Regiment and other British Army units. It features a purposes built village for urban combat training. Buffadero is also used by the Gibraltar Defence Police and the Royal Gibraltar Police for public order training.

The hill is also the location of Windmill Hill Signal Station, used by the Royal Navy for monitoring maritime activity in the Strait of Gibraltar.

== Permanent units ==
Though Gibraltar's current garrison is much smaller than it had been before the end of the Cold War, a sizable force still exists, including:

Ministry of Defence (MoD)/HQ British Forces Gibraltar (145 military personnel as of 2023 plus 528 civilians under contract)

- Armaments Depot, Gibraltar, Defence Equipment and Support
- Kings lines oil fuel depot, Oil and Pipelines Agency

Army

- Royal Gibraltar Regiment (Hybrid), at Devil's Tower Camp (Mixed infantry-focused unit; 235 personnel reported as of 2023)
- Buffadero Training Centre

Navy (28 personnel as of 2023, plus additional personnel assigned to HMS Trent)

- Windmill Hill Signal Station
- His Majesty's Naval Base, Gibraltar
  - Gibraltar Squadron, at His Majesty's Naval Base, Gibraltar
    - River-class offshore patrol vessel: HMS Trent – intermittently deployed from Gibraltar since April 2021
    - Cutlass-class patrol vessels (replaced previous Archer-class boats 2021/22):
      - HMS Cutlass (arrived in Gibraltar, November 2021)
      - HMS Dagger (arrived in Gibraltar, March 2022)
    - 3 x Pacific 24 Rigid-hulled inflatable boats (RHIBs)
    - 1 x Sea-class 15 m diving support boat (DSB Crabb)
    - "Quadcopter" light reconnaissance/surveillance UAV team from 700 Naval Air Squadron

Royal Air Force (16 personnel as of 2023)

- RAF Gibraltar

Gibraltar Defence Police

- Marine Unit:
  - 2 x 15 m patrol boats
  - 2 x RHIBs

== Previous commanders ==
=== Senior Officer, Gibraltar ===
Post holders included:

- Captain Claude E. Buckle: August 1889 – February 1892
- Captain Atwell P.M. Lake: February 1892 – January 1895
- Captain James A.T. Bruce: January 1895 – January 1898
- Captain Charles C. Drury: January 1898 – September 1899
- Captain William H. Pigott: September 1899 – October 1902 (later V.Adm Sir William Harvey Pigott)

=== Flag Officer, Gibraltar ===
Post holders included:

- Vice-Admiral Sir William A. Dyke Acland, Bt.: October 1902 – July 1904
- Rear-Admiral Sir Edward Chichester, Bt.: July 1904 – September 1906
- Rear-Admiral Sir James E.C. Goodrich: September 1906 – September 1909
- Vice-Admiral Frederick S. Pelham: September 1909 – October 1912
- Vice-Admiral Frederic E. E. Brock: October 1912 – October 1915
- Rear-Admiral Bernard Currey: October 1915 – July 1917 (and as Senior Naval Officer and in charge of all Naval Establishments, Gibraltar)
- Rear-Admiral Sir Heathcoat S.Grant: July 1917 – July 1919
- Rear-Admiral Sir Reginald Y.Tyrwhitt, Bt.: July 1919 – January 1921
- Rear-Admiral Henry B.Pelly: January 1921 – January 1923 (also Admiral Superintendent, Gibraltar Yard)
- Rear-Admiral Walter M. Ellerton: January 1923 – April 1925
- Rear-Admiral Richard G.A.W.Stapleton-Cotton: April 1925 – April 1927 (also Admiral Superintendent of H.M. Dockyard, Gibraltar)
- Rear-Admiral Cyril S. Townsend: April 1927 – April 1929 (also Admiral Superintendent of H.M. Dockyard, Gibraltar)
- Rear-Admiral Berwick Curtis: April 1929 – April 1931
- Rear-Admiral Thomas N. James: April 1931 – May 1933
- Rear-Admiral Francis M. Austin: May 1933 – May 1935
- Vice-Admiral Sir James M. Pipon: May 1935 – May 1937
- Rear-Admiral Alfred E. Evans: May 1937 – May 1939, as Rear Admiral-in-Charge, and Admiral-Superintendent HM Dockyard Gibraltar

=== Flag Officer, Gibraltar and North Atlantic ===
- Rear-Admiral Norman A. Wodehouse: May–November 1939
- Admiral Sir Dudley B. N. North: November 1939 – December 1940
- Vice-Admiral Sir G. Frederick B. Edward-Collins: December 1940 – December 1942

=== Flag Officer, Gibraltar and Mediterranean Approaches ===
Post holders included:

- Vice-Admiral Sir Frederick Edward-Collins: December 1942 - January 1943
- Admiral Sir Frederick Edward-Collins: January 1943 - August 1943
- Vice-Admiral Sir Harold M. Burrough: September 1943 – January 1945
- Vice-Admiral Sir Victor Crutchley: January 1945 – December 1946

=== Flag Officer, Gibraltar ===
Post holders included:

- Vice-Admiral Ernest R. Archer: December 1946 – June 1948
- Vice-Admiral Patrick W.B. Brooking: June 1948 – June 1950
- Vice-Admiral Lord Ashbourne: June 1950 – May 1952
- Rear-Admiral St. John A. Micklethwait: May 1952 – October 1953
- Rear-Admiral Harry P. Currey: October 1953 – May 1956
- Rear-Admiral Roy S. Foster-Brown: May 1956 – February 1959
- Rear-Admiral Philip F. Powlett: February 1959 – March 1962
- Rear-Admiral Erroll N. Sinclair: March 1962 – July 1964
- Rear-Admiral Thomas W. Best: July 1964 – November 1966
- Rear-Admiral Michael F. Fell: November 1966 – April 1968
- Rear-Admiral Ian W. Jamieson: April 1968 – October 1969
- Rear-Admiral A. Rodney B. Sturdee: October 1969 – January 1972
- Rear-Admiral Hubert W.E. Hollins: January 1972 – May 1974
- Rear-Admiral Sefton R. Sandford: May 1974 – September 1976
- Rear-Admiral Michael L. Stacey: September 1976 – January 1979
- Rear-Admiral Gwynedd Pritchard: January 1979 – January 1981
- Rear-Admiral D. John Mackenzie: January 1981 – January 1983
- Rear-Admiral George Vallings: January 1983 – March 1985
- Rear-Admiral Peter G.V. Dingemans: March 1985 – September 1987
- Rear-Admiral the Hon. Nicholas J. Hill-Norton: September 1987 – January 1990
- Rear-Admiral Geoffrey Biggs (January 1990 – April 1992)

=== Commander British Forces, Gibraltar ===
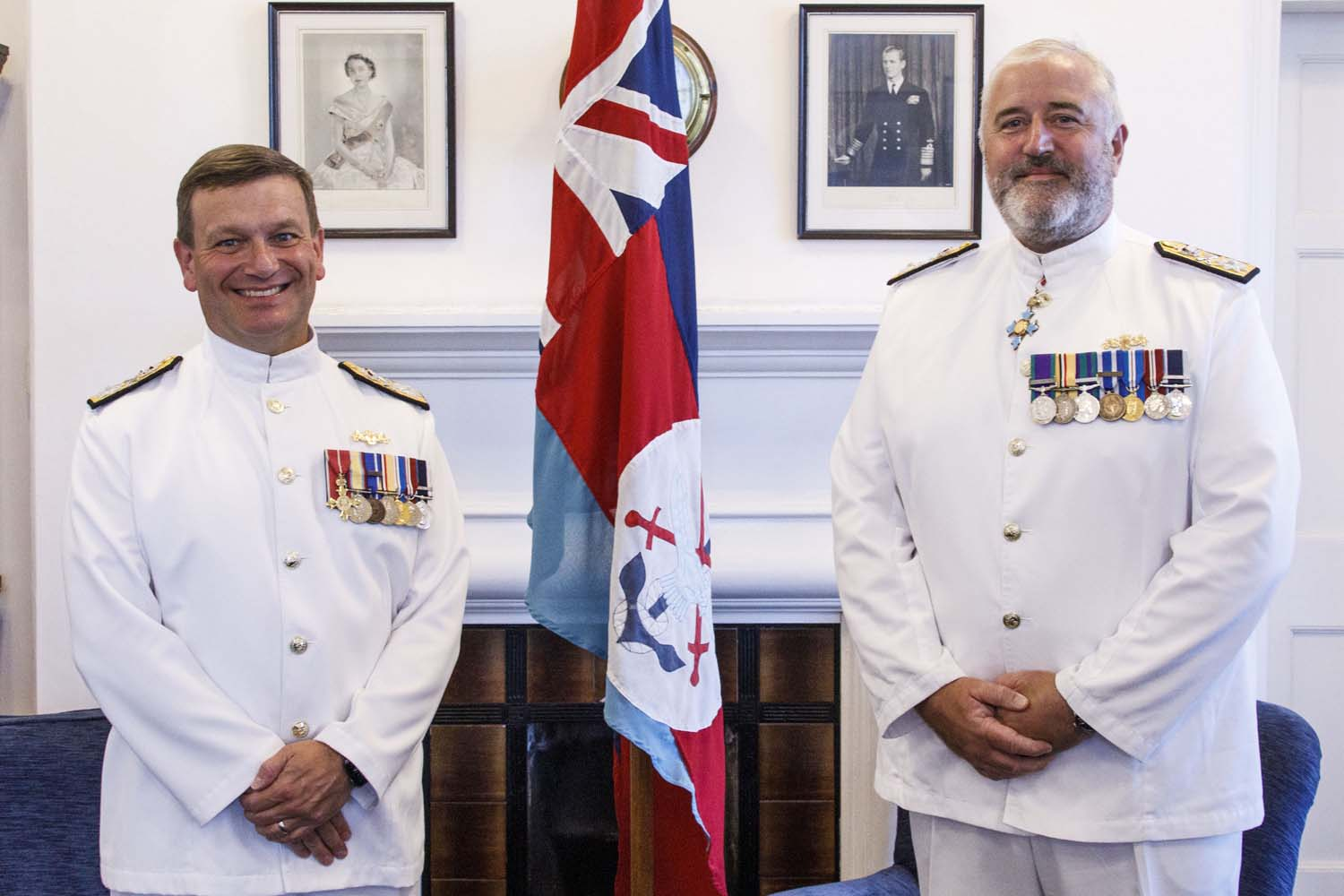
Commodores Tim Henry (left) and Steve Dainton

Post holders included:

- Rear Admiral Jeremy Sanders (April 1992 – December 1994)
- Major-General Simon Pack (December 1994 – April 1997)
- Commodore Alastair Taylor (April 1997 – June 1999)
- Commodore Andrew Willmett (June 1999 – December 2001)
- Commodore Richard Clapp (December 2001 – May 2004)
- Commodore David White (May 2004 – 8 January 2005)
- Commodore Allan Adair (19 January 2005 – 1 May 2007)
- Commodore Matt Parr (1 May 2007 – February 2009)
- Commodore Adrian Bell (February 2009 – September 2010)
- Commodore Tom Karsten (September 2010 – November 2012)
- Commodore John Clink (November 2012 – August 2014)
- Commodore Ian McGhie (August 2014 – July 2016)
- Commodore Mike Walliker (July 2016 – September 2018)
- Commodore Timothy Henry (September 2018 – July 2020)
- Commodore Steve Dainton (July 2020 – June 2022)
- Commodore Tom Guy (June 2022 – June 2026)
- Commodore Tim Davey (June 2026 – present)

== See also ==
- List of British Army installations
