= Sturdy =

Sturdy may refer to:

== People ==
- Sturdy (surname)
- Carl Sturdy, a pen name of Charles S. Strong (1906–1962), American writer, adventurer and explorer.
- Don Sturdy, an early stage name of actor Howard Hesseman (1940–2022)
- Sturdy Maxwell (c. 1898–?), Scottish footballer

== Ships ==
- USS Sturdy, three United States Navy ships
- HMS Sturdy, three British Royal Navy ships

== Other uses ==
- Sturdy (infection), a parasitic infection that develops in the intermediate hosts of the tapeworm
- Don Sturdy, a fictional character in the Don Sturdy series of American children's adventure novels published between 1925 and 1935

== See also ==
- Sturdee, a surname (with a list of people of this name)
