= Gibraltar Squadron =

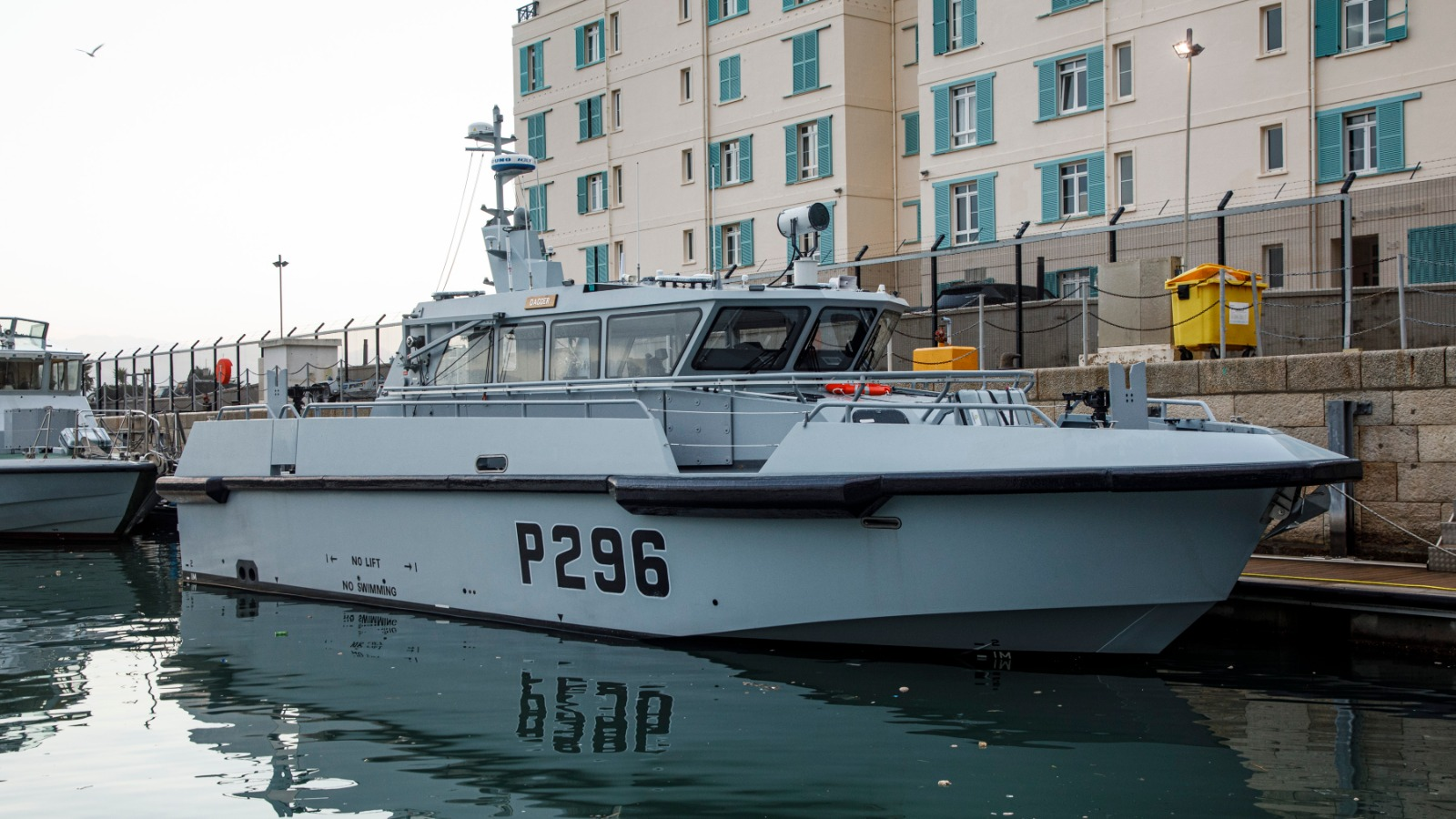
- HMS Dagger at HM Naval Base, Gibraltar
- Active: 28 August 1985 – present
- Country: United Kingdom
- Branch: Royal Navy
- Type: Squadron
- Role: Maritime security and Force Protection
- Size: 1 Offshore Patrol Vessel (OPV) (intermittently deployed), 2 Fast Patrol Boats, 3 Rigid-hulled Inflatable Boats (RHIBS), 1 diving support boat & 28 personnel (+ c. 34-50 assigned to the OPV)
- Garrison/HQ: PJOB Gibraltar/HQ British Forces Gibraltar
- Website: www.royalnavy.mod.uk/news-and-latest-activity/operations/mediterranean-and-black-sea/gibraltar-squadron

Commanders
- Current commander: Lt Cdr J R Davies RN

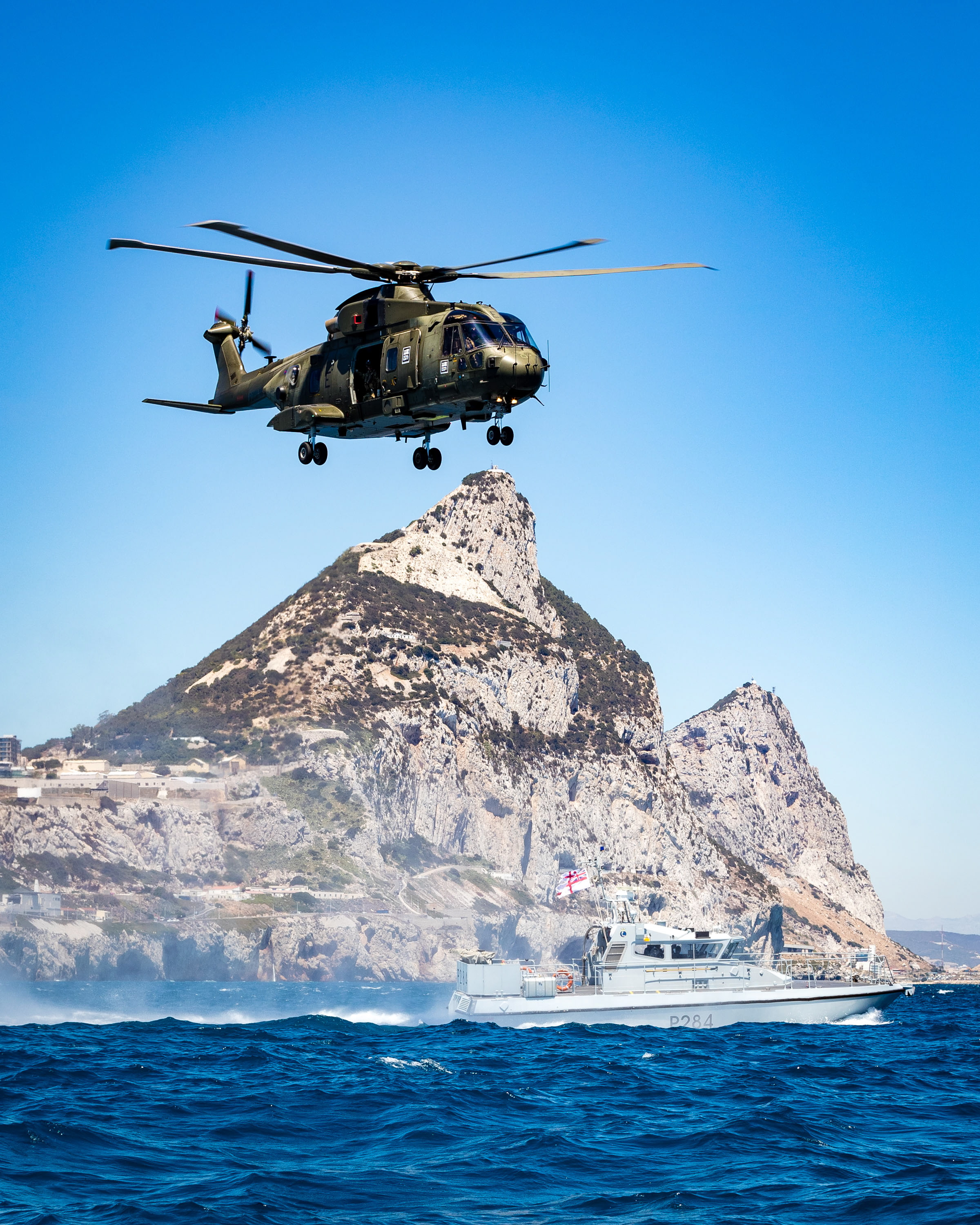
Merlin HC3 of 846 NAS with former HMS Scimitar

The Gibraltar Squadron is a unit of the British Royal Navy. It is the only seagoing Royal Naval unit based in Gibraltar, attached to British Forces Gibraltar. It currently includes two Cutlass-class fast patrol boats with a maximum speed of up to 41-knots. The squadron also uses four Arctic-24 rigid-hulled inflatable boats and deploys one diving support boat (DSB Crabb, named for Royal Navy diver Lionel Crabb). The 2021 defence white paper indicated that henceforth, one River-class offshore patrol vessel, HMS Trent, would also be permanently based in Gibraltar for operations in the Mediterranean and in the Gulf of Guinea, though by 2025/26 she was less often deployed from Gibraltar. As of 2023, 28 personnel were assigned to the squadron, along with additional personnel assigned to HMS Trent when operating from the territory.

== History ==
England's capture of Gibraltar in 1704 provided an essential operating base for the Royal Navy at the entrance to the Mediterranean and led to the establishment of a strong naval presence in the territory. This permanent British fleet presence at Gibraltar was maintained in varied forms through the centuries until the rundown and abolition of the British Mediterranean Fleet in 1967. From the 1970s, the British naval presence in the region took on a more intermittent character, though Gibraltar remained important as a British naval staging base and was so used, for example, during the Falklands War in 1982. The importance of ensuring the security of Royal Navy facilities in Gibraltar was illustrated by the mooted but thwarted Argentine special forces Operation Algeciras which envisaged an attack on British ships using Gibraltar during the War.

Gibraltar remains an important staging base for the Royal Navy, for instance hosting some 79 ship visits during 2022. All told, between 12,000 and 14,000 British military personnel are said to transit through Gibraltar in any given year. Gibraltar incorporates underground weapon storage facilities suitable for holding munition stocks that can be drawn on to replenish Royal Navy vessels. In 2024, HMS Diamond transitted to Gibraltar to replenish its stocks of Aster 15 and/or 30 missiles after operations in the Red Sea against Houthis rebels.

The current Gibraltar Squadron, focused on the role of base and coastal security, was established on 28 August 1985 following the withdrawal of the RAF Marine Craft Unit No. 1102. The two motor launches attached to the previous unit, HMAFV Sunderland and Stirling, remained however and were subsequently renamed HM ships Hart and Cormorant respectively. Both vessels remained with the squadron until May 1991 when they were replaced by the new P2000 patrol boats HM Ships Ranger and Trumpeter. These in turn remained with the squadron until 2003.

Following the 9/11 terrorist attacks, security arrangements for the squadron were enhanced and the unit received yet another new pair of patrol boats, HMS Sabre and HMS Scimitar, as well as three new RHIBs, in September 2002. The unit has played host to nine URNU students each summer for a two-week acquaint, giving them experience of a front line unit. In August 2011 the unit moved into its new facilities in the Old Boathouse on the Gibraltar waterfront. HM Ships Scimitar and Sabre, previously known as MV Grey Fox and MV Grey Wolf respectively, had previously served in Northern Ireland. The two boats were capable of 30 knots and were armed with two General Purpose Machine guns (GPMGs). They were deployed with the Gibraltar Squadron from 2002 until 2020, when they were replaced on an interim basis by the Archer-class boats, Dasher and Pursuer.

The Spanish Navy and Civil Guard regularly and repeatedly enter Gibraltar territorial waters and vessels of the squadron are routinely dispatched to intercept them. In April 2024, a patrol boat belonging to the Spanish Civil Guard crashed into runway lights adjacent to the runway at the Gibraltar airport after reportedly pursuing suspected smugglers into Gibraltar territorial waters. Despite serious damage, the boat managed to return to Spain. The issue of sovereignty over Gibraltar has been a matter of contention between the United Kingdom and Spain since the territory first became a British colony and latterly an overseas territory.

In 2012, the Conservative-Lib Dem coalition government undertook a review of the facilities and services associated with British Forces in Gibraltar. The review, known as Project EUSTON, has established that the three service units (the Gibraltar Squadron, RAF Gibraltar and the Gibraltar Regiment) will remain whilst some facilities and services will be handed over to the civilian government.

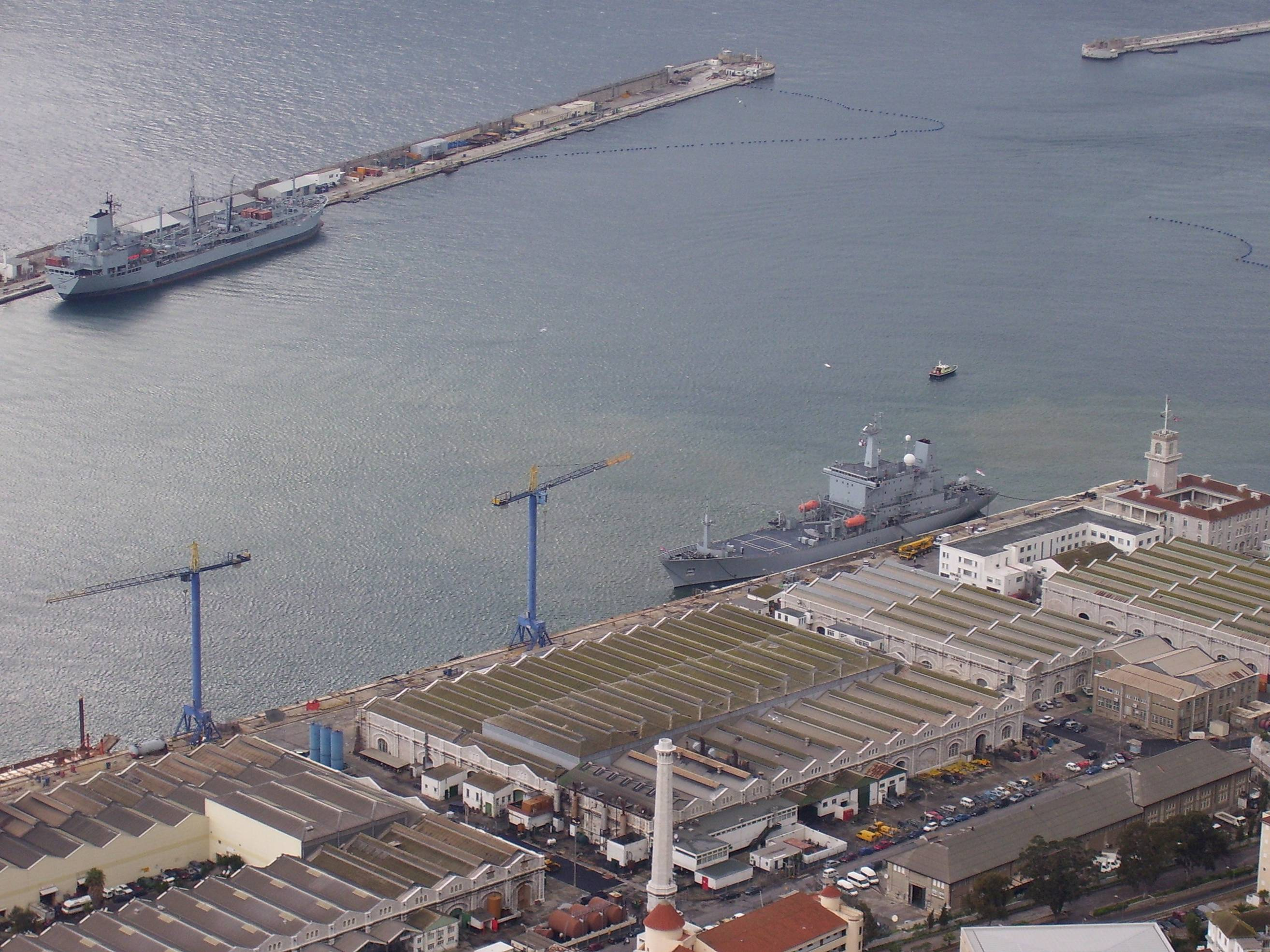
The naval dockyard at Gibraltar, used by visiting warships.

In July 2017 it was revealed that the squadron would receive two new warships which will be more "capable", "faster" and have "bigger guns", to replace HM Ships Sabre and Scimitar "within the next two years". In June 2020, pending further news of the new-build vessels, HMS Dasher and HMS Pursuer, a pair of Archer class patrol boats previously attached to the Cyprus Squadron, were transported to Gibraltar to serve as interim replacements for Sabre and Scimitar. In July 2020, a contract was signed between the MoD and Merseyside-based boat builder Marine Specialised Technology for the construction and delivery of two new boats for Gibraltar. The first boat arrived in Gibraltar in November 2021 and the second arrived in March 2022. In May, 2022 the two Archer-class patrol boats, Dasher and Pursuer, departed Gibraltar and returned to the U.K.

In April 2021, pursuant to a decision announced in the 2021 defence white paper, the 2000-tonne Offshore Patrol Vessel HMS Trent also arrived for permanent posting at Gibraltar.

== Current organisation ==
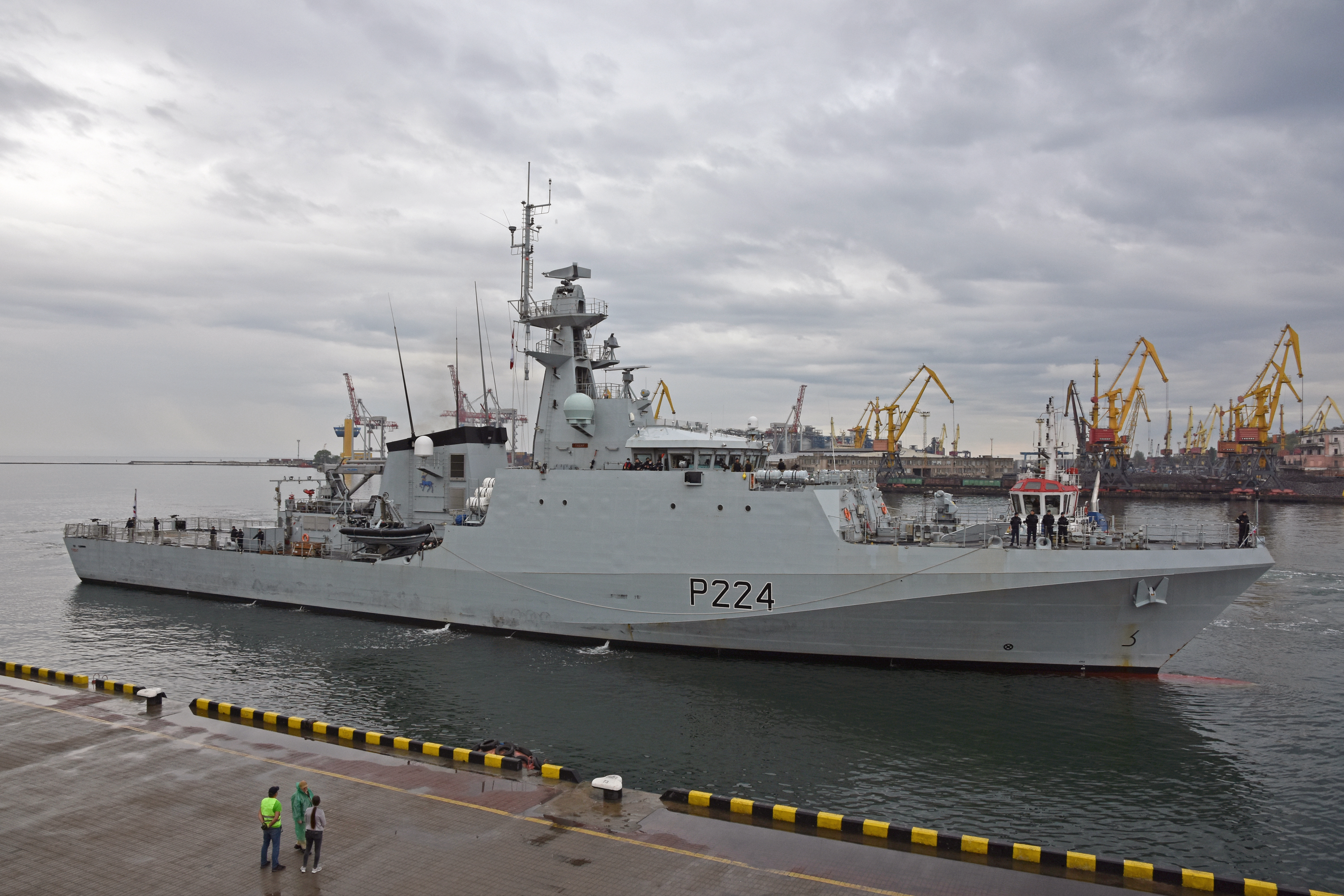
HMS Trent on deployment to the Black Sea and Ukraine, May 2021

The current organisation of the squadron is as follows:

- Gibraltar Squadron, at His Majesty's Naval Base, Gibraltar
  - River-class offshore patrol vessel:
    - HMS Trent – intermittently operating from Gibraltar since April 2021
  - Cutlass-class patrol vessels (replaced previously deployed Archer-class boats):
    - HMS Cutlass (arrived in Gibraltar in November 2021)
    - HMS Dagger (arrived in Gibraltar in March 2022)
  - 3 x Pacific 24 Rigid-hulled inflatable boats
  - 1 x Sea-class 15 m diving support boat (DSB Crabb)
  - "Quadcopter" light reconnaissance/surveillance UAV team from 700 Naval Air Squadron

Marine services at the Port of Gibraltar, including for naval vessels using the port, are provided by Boluda Towage Europe. Boluda acquired Resolve Marine Group in February 2024, which had previously been providing marine services at the port with one ASD ocean-going and harbour tug (Resolve Hercules), four harbour tugs (Rooke, Wellington, Egerton and Eliott), two barges (Isaac 1874 and RMG 280) as well as the anchor-handling tug Resolve Blizzard, which can provide regional firefighting, oil pollution and emergency response services. Several of these assets were acquired by Boluda. In June 2024, Boluda strengthened its own presence at Gibraltar by adding the tugboat VB Responder to its fleet.

== Boathouse ==
Since 2011 the Gibraltar Squadron has shared a headquarters and boathouse with the Marine Unit of the Gibraltar Defence Police. The boathouse accommodates the Navy's two patrol boats and three RHIBs, and the police's two patrol boats and two RHIBs.

== Mission ==
According to the Royal Navy, the unit's mission is to:

"To contribute to the maritime defence and security of Gibraltar and, where necessary, the prosecution of offensive maritime operations in order to allow BFG to support military ops as directed by HMG."

Based in a purpose-built headquarters in Gibraltar, the Squadron is operational throughout the year in order to meet its directive from Commander British Forces Gibraltar, with particular regard to the security and integrity of British Gibraltar Territorial Waters (BGTW). It is also responsible for the protection of British, NATO and allied warships passing through the Strait of Gibraltar or entering the naval base. Uniquely for the Royal Navy, the Squadron is permanently assigned to the Operational Command of Commander Joint Operations. The squadron is attached to the Portsmouth Flotilla and is one of only a few units permanently stationed overseas.

== See also ==
- List of squadrons and flotillas of the Royal Navy
- Portsmouth Flotilla
- British Forces Gibraltar
- Royal Navy Cyprus Squadron
