= Sturdy (surname) =

Sturdy is a surname, and may refer to:

- Daryl Sturdy (born 1940), Canadian rower
- Deborah Sturdy, British nurse and academic
- Fred Sturdy (1908–1972), American pole vaulter
- Guy Sturdy (1899-1965), American baseball player
- John Henry Sturdy (1893–1966), Canadian educator and politician from Saskatchewan
- John V. M. Sturdy (1933–1996), English biblical scholar and academic
- Jordan Sturdy (born 1962/3), Canadian politician
- Julian Sturdy (born 1971), British farmer and politician, son of Robert Study
- Martha Sturdy (born 1942), Canadian artist and designer
- Robert Sturdy (born 1944), British farmer and politician
- Todd Sturdy (born 1967), American football coach

== See also ==
- Johanna Hill and Johanna Sturdy, English bell-maker duo of the 15th century
- Sturdee
