= HMS Dagger (P296) =

2022 Cutlass-class fast patrol boat of the Royal Navy

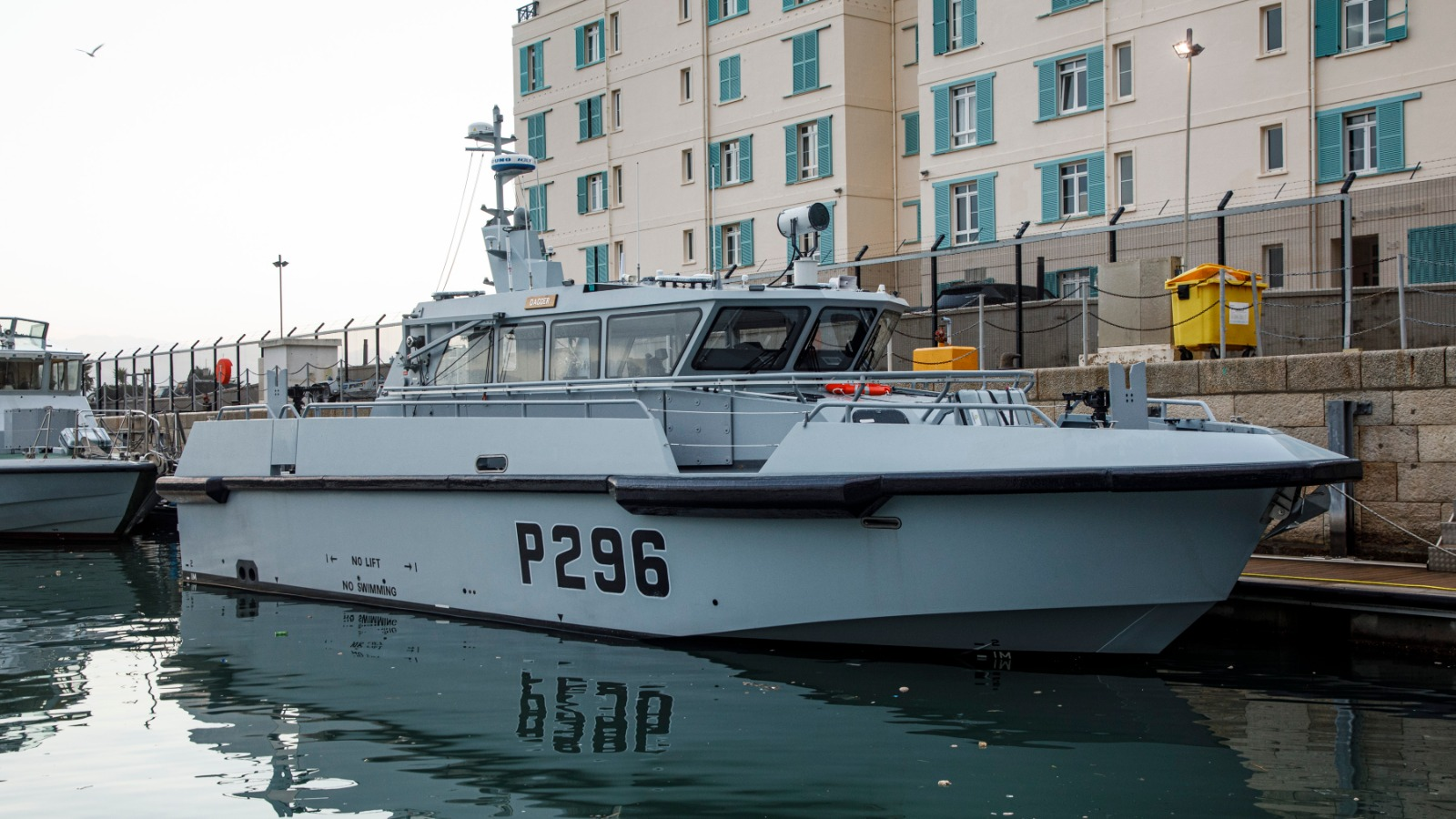
- HMS Dagger at Gibraltar, 2022

History

United Kingdom
- Name: HMS Dagger
- Builder: Marine Specialised Technology, Merseyside
- Laid down: July 2020
- Commissioned: 14 July 2022
- Home port: PJOB Gibraltar/HQ British Forces Gibraltar
- Identification: Pennant number: P296
- Status: In service

General characteristics
- Class & type: Cutlass-class patrol vessel
- Displacement: 35 tons (full load)
- Length: 19 m (62 ft 4 in)
- Propulsion: Three Volvo D13 engines; triple MJP 350X waterjets
- Speed: 41 knots (76 km/h; 47 mph)
- Complement: 6 personnel + up to 6 passengers
- Armament: 3 × general purpose machine guns (bow & stern-mounted); [For but not with: 1 × .50 machine gun]
- Aircraft carried: "Quadcopter" light reconnaissance/surveillance UAVs can be embarked

HMS Dagger is a Cutlass-class fast patrol boat of the British Royal Navy. She is a fast patrol boat with a maximum speed around 41 knots (76 km/h; 47 mph) designed for sovereignty protection and coastal security duties. She is part of the Royal Navy's Gibraltar Squadron and arrived in the territory in April 2022

Along with HMS Cutlass, she replaced the Scimitar-class patrol vessels in Gibraltar. The Scimitar-class boats were deployed in Gibraltar after 2003 but were withdrawn from the territory in 2020, being then replaced by two Archer-class boats on an interim basis until the arrival of the Cutlass-class vessels.

On 14 July 2022, she was commissioned into the Royal Navy. In April 2023, Dagger was called upon to escort the Spanish patrol ship Infanta Cristina as she made an illegal transit. In the Spanish view, the 1713 Treaty of Utrecht, which Spain signed, incorporated British sovereignty over the land, but not the waters, of Gibraltar. Britain rejected this view. In May 2023, HMS Dagger paid a foreign port visit to Tangier in Morocco.

In August 2024, HMS Dagger was called upon to escort the Spanish Navy patrol vessel Rayo which, in the British view, made an illegal transit through Gibraltar territorial waters.

== See also ==
- British Forces Gibraltar
- Gibraltar Squadron
