= Simon Pack =

Major General Simon Pack CB CBE
- Military career
- Allegiance: United Kingdom
- Branch: Royal Marines
- Service years: 1962–1997
- Rank: Major-General
- Commands: 45 Commando; British Forces Gibraltar
- Conflicts: Indonesia–Malaysia confrontation The Troubles
- Awards: Companion of the Order of the Bath; Commander of the Order of the British Empire

Major-General Simon James Pack CB CBE is a retired Royal Marines officer.

== Military career ==
Educated at Fernden Preparatory School in Surrey and Hurstpierpoint College, Pack was commissioned into the Royal Marines in 1962. As a junior officer he was deployed to Sarawak during the Indonesia–Malaysia confrontation. After serving in Northern Ireland during The Troubles, he became Commanding Officer of 45 Commando in 1987, Director Commitments (Overseas) in 1990 during the Gulf War and Commander British Forces Gibraltar in 1994.

Since his retirement from the Royal Marines in 1997, Pack has been International Teams Director of the England and Wales Cricket Board and Partnership Secretary of Gill Jennings & Every, a law firm.
