= HMS Cutlass (P295) =

2022 Cutlass-class fast patrol boat of the Royal Navy

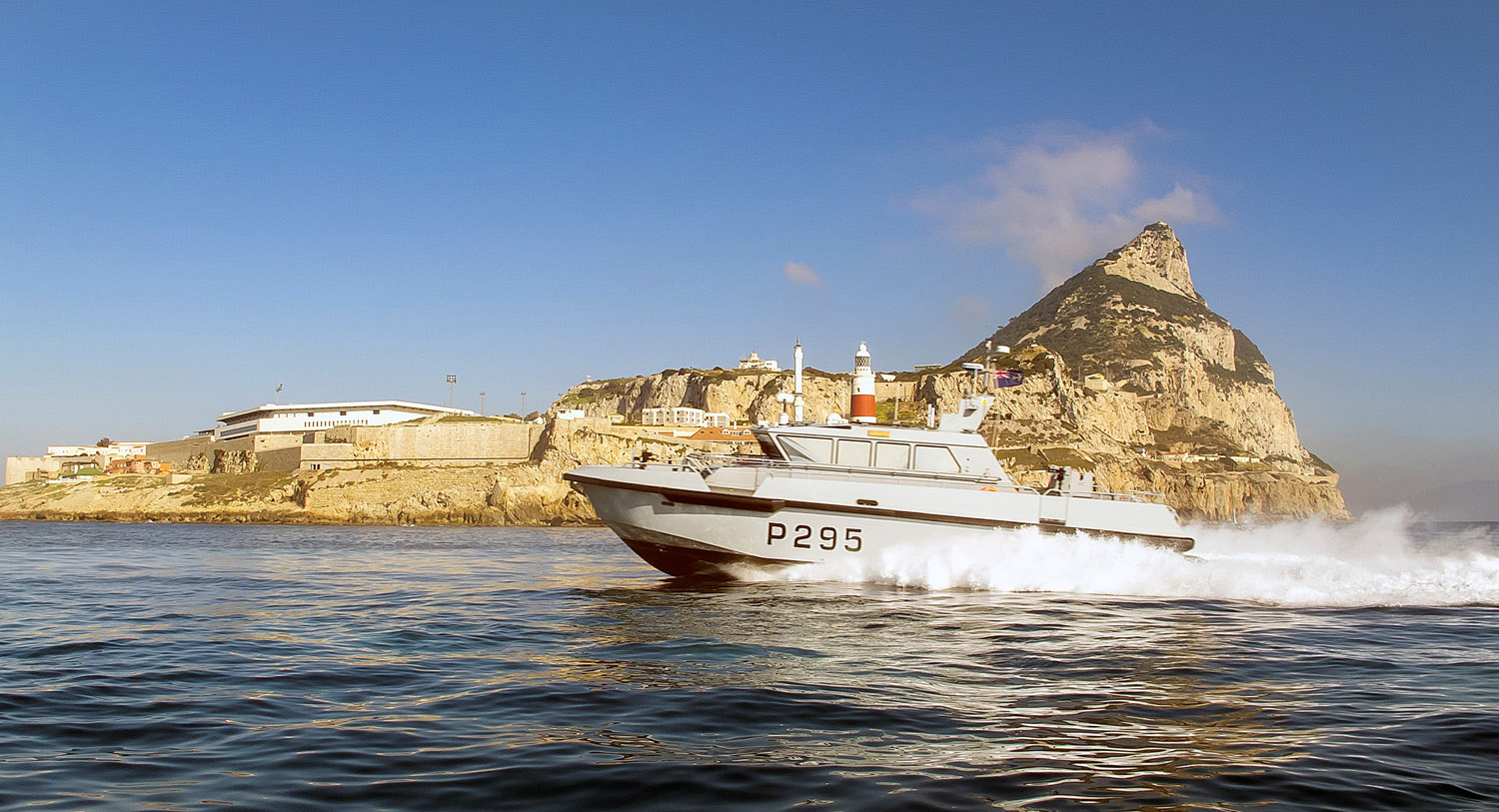
- HMS Cutlass, 2022

History

United Kingdom
- Name: HMS Cutlass
- Builder: Marine Specialised Technology, Merseyside
- Laid down: July 2020
- Acquired: November 2021
- Commissioned: 4 May 2022
- Home port: PJOB Gibraltar/HQ British Forces Gibraltar
- Identification: Pennant number: P295; IMO number: 4764159; MMSI number: 232035463; Callsign: GDFJ
- Status: In service

General characteristics
- Class & type: Cutlass-class patrol vessel
- Displacement: 35 tons (full load)
- Length: 19 m (62 ft 4 in)
- Propulsion: Three Volvo D13 engines; triple MJP 350X waterjets
- Speed: 41 knots (76 km/h; 47 mph)
- Complement: 6 personnel + up to 6 passengers
- Armament: 3 × general purpose machine guns (bow & stern-mounted); [For but not with: 1 × .50 machine gun]
- Aircraft carried: "Quadcopter" light reconnaissance/surveillance UAVs can be embarked

HMS Cutlass is a Cutlass-class fast patrol boat of the British Royal Navy. She is a fast patrol boat with a maximum speed around 41 knots (76 km/h; 47 mph) designed for sovereignty protection and coastal security duties. She is part of the Royal Navy's Gibraltar Squadron and arrived in the territory in November 2021 after undergoing sea trials in Liverpool. The boat was formally handed over to the Royal Navy in March 2022.

Along with HMS Dagger, she is replacing the Scimitar-class patrol vessels in Gibraltar. The Scimitar-class boats were deployed in Gibraltar after 2003 but were withdrawn from the territory in 2020, being then replaced by two Archer-class boats on an interim basis until the arrival of the Cutlass-class vessels.

On 4 May 2022, she was commissioned into the Royal Navy.

In May 2024, Cutlass deployed to Algarve coast for joint exercises with the Portuguese Navy.

In March 2026, Cutlass took part in a joint operation with the French navy to seize a sanctioned Russian oil tanker.

== See also ==
- British Forces Gibraltar
