= Deborah Sturdy =

British nurse and academic

Deborah Sturdy CBE FRCN is a British nurse and professor. She is the Government of the United Kingdom Chief Nurse for Social Care. She was awarded an Order of the British Empire in 2017 and made a Commander of the British Empire in 2023.

== Career ==
When Sturdy was awarded the British Geriatric Society Presidents Medal in 2011, she was the first ever nurse to receive such an honour. From February 2020, Sturdy worked as an advisor on social care to the Chief Nursing Officer. In December 2020 she was announced the UK's first Chief Nurse for Adult Social Care. During the COVID-19 pandemic, this role looked to transform the experiences of the 430,000 UK people living in care homes. She looked to champion the interests of social care nurses to government, and provide leadership to the workforce. The post was made permanent in September 2021. In 2022 she launched the Adult Social Care Awards.

== Awards and honours ==
- 2011 British Geriatric Society Presidents Medal
- 2015 Nurse Leaders Award
- 2017, Sturdy was appointed a Officer of the Order of the British Empire in the New Year Honours List
- 2018 Fellow of the Queen's Nursing Institute
- 2019 Fellow of the Royal College of Nursing

== Select publications ==
- Julienne Meyer; Deborah Sturdy (2004). "Exploring the future of gerontological nursing outcomes". Journal of Clinical Nursing. 13 (6B): 128–134. doi:10.1111/j.1365-2702.2004.01053.x. PMID 15724828. Wikidata Q36051214.
- Amelia Rout; Sue Ashby; Sian Maslin-Prothero; et al. (2011). "A literature review of interprofessional working and intermediate care in the UK". Journal of Clinical Nursing. 20 (5–6): 775–783. doi:10.1111/j.1365-2702.2009.03156.x. PMID 20662994. Wikidata Q37776010.
