= Rodney Sturdee =

Rear-Admiral Arthur Rodney Barry Sturdee CB DSO (6 December 1919 – 6 October 2009) was a Royal Navy officer who saw active service in the Second World War on HMS Exeter and in minesweepers and ended his career as Flag Officer, Gibraltar.

== Early life ==
The son of a naval officer, Commander Barry Victor Sturdee, whose father had been a Church of England clergyman in Devon and a first cousin of Admiral of the Fleet Sir Doveton Sturdee, the young Sturdee was educated at the Royal Naval College, Dartmouth, passing out on 1 September 1938, at the age of eighteen, and joining the Royal Navy as a midshipman.

== Career ==
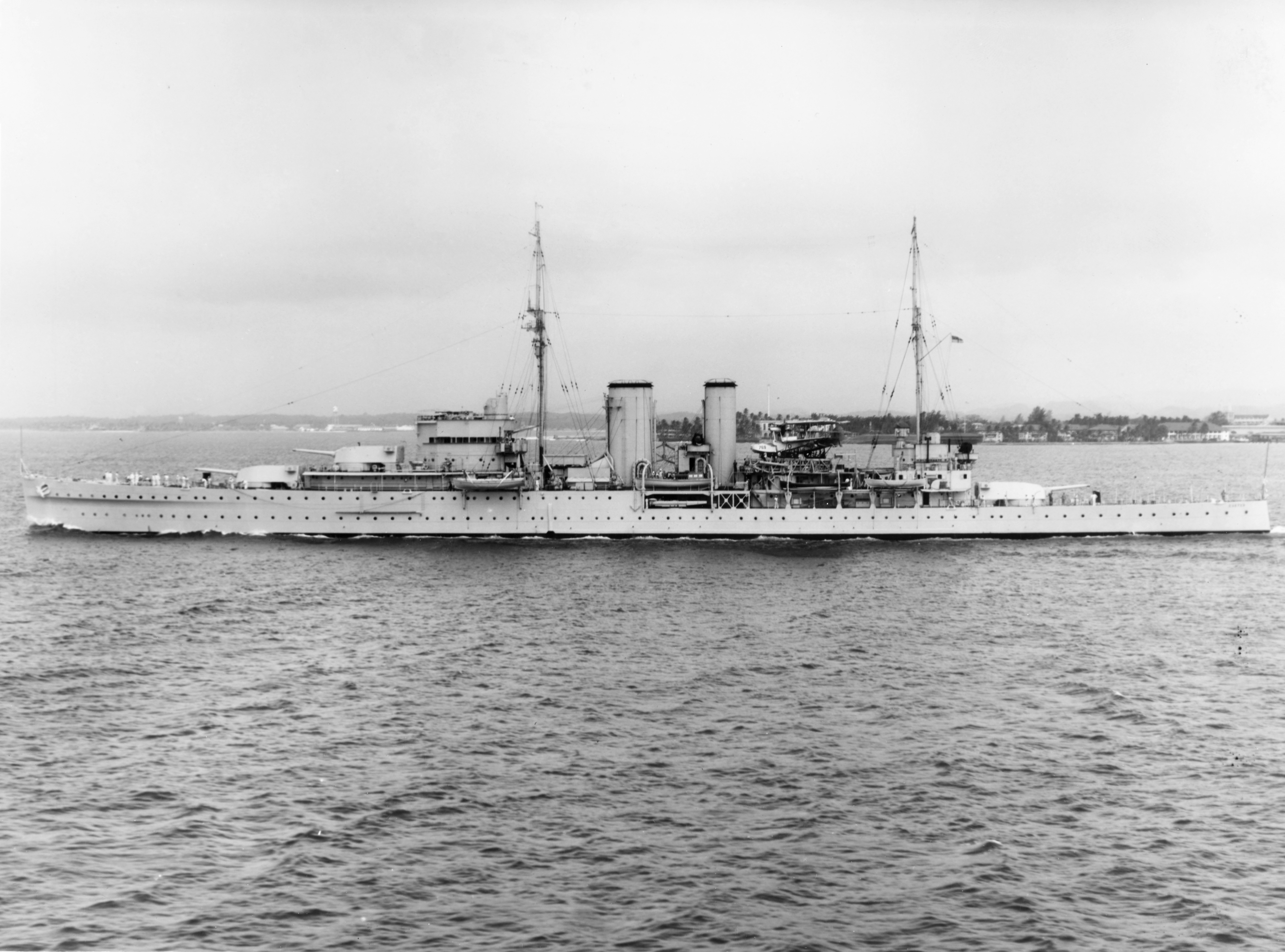
HMS Exeter

When Britain and France declared war on Germany in 1939, Sturdee was serving in the South Atlantic on the York-class cruiser HMS Exeter, which had been sent to help the survivors of an earthquake in Chile. His ship was conveniently placed to be sent to take part in the Battle of the River Plate of December 1939 and was badly damaged by enemy fire. An obituary for Sturdee states that he was a 'spotting officer' in one of the eight in gun turrets, two of the three of which were knocked out of action, leaving him "lucky to be alive". She then steamed for the Falkland Islands, where she stayed for several weeks to make repairs. On 29 February 1940, with Captain F. S. Bell and other officers and men of Exeter, Sturdee was given the Freedom of the City of Exeter, when they marched through the streets with the ship’s shell-torn White Ensign, welcomed by a crowd of 50,000.

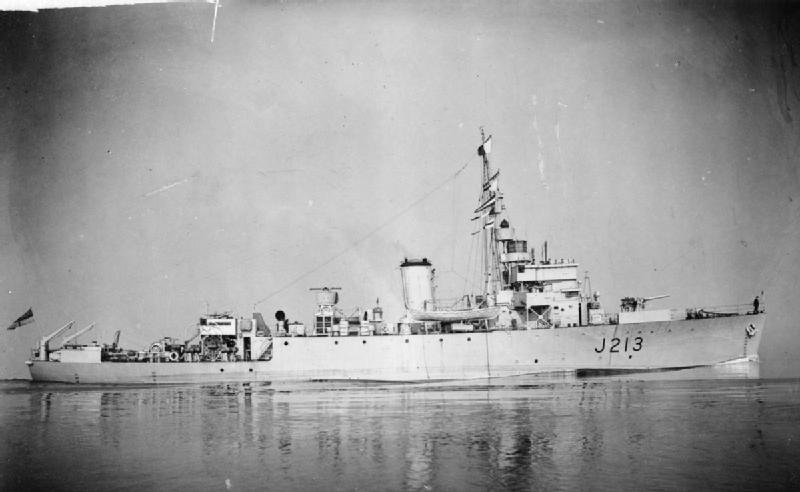
HMS Algerine

Sturdee was promoted to Sub-Lieutenant in January 1941, and Lieutenant a month later. He was transferred to service in the Algerine-class minesweepers HMS Fly, St Kilda, Albacore, Squall, Waterwitch, Cadmus, Nimbus, Stornoway, Acute and Brave, and on 12 June 1945 was awarded the Distinguished Service Cross for his work in arduous minesweeping operations on the coasts of Italy. The citation read “for skill, perseverance and great devotion to duty”. From July to September 1945, he was posted to an onshore navigation course, and then in September rejoined HMS Fly as Navigating Officer.

Sturdee was promoted to Lieutenant-Commander in February 1949, Commander in December 1952, Captain in June 1960, and Rear Admiral on 7 July 1969, ending his naval career as Flag Officer, Gibraltar, from October 1969 to January 1972, with the further title of Admiral Superintendent, HM Dockyard, Gibraltar.

On 7 April 1972, Sturdee retired from the navy to his native Worcestershire and soon took up a new job as bursar at Malvern Girls College, which lasted until 1985. He was president of the Worcestershire branch of the Royal British Legion and also of the Malvern Sea Cadets.

== Personal life ==
In 1953, Sturdee married firstly in Mulhouse, Alsace, Marie-Claire Amstoutz, whom he met while she was working at the French Embassy in London. They had a son and a daughter, Dominique and Christopher. His first wife died in 1995, and in 2001, at the age of 81, Sturdee married secondly, a widow with a daughter, and they lived together at Castlemorton Common in the Malvern Hills until his death.

== Honours ==
- Concepcion Award (Chile), 24 January 1939
- Freedom of the City of Exeter, 29 February 1940
- Distinguished Service Cross, 1945
- Companion of the Order of the Bath, June 1971
