= HMS Trent (P224) =

2020 River-class offshore patrol vessel of the Royal Navy

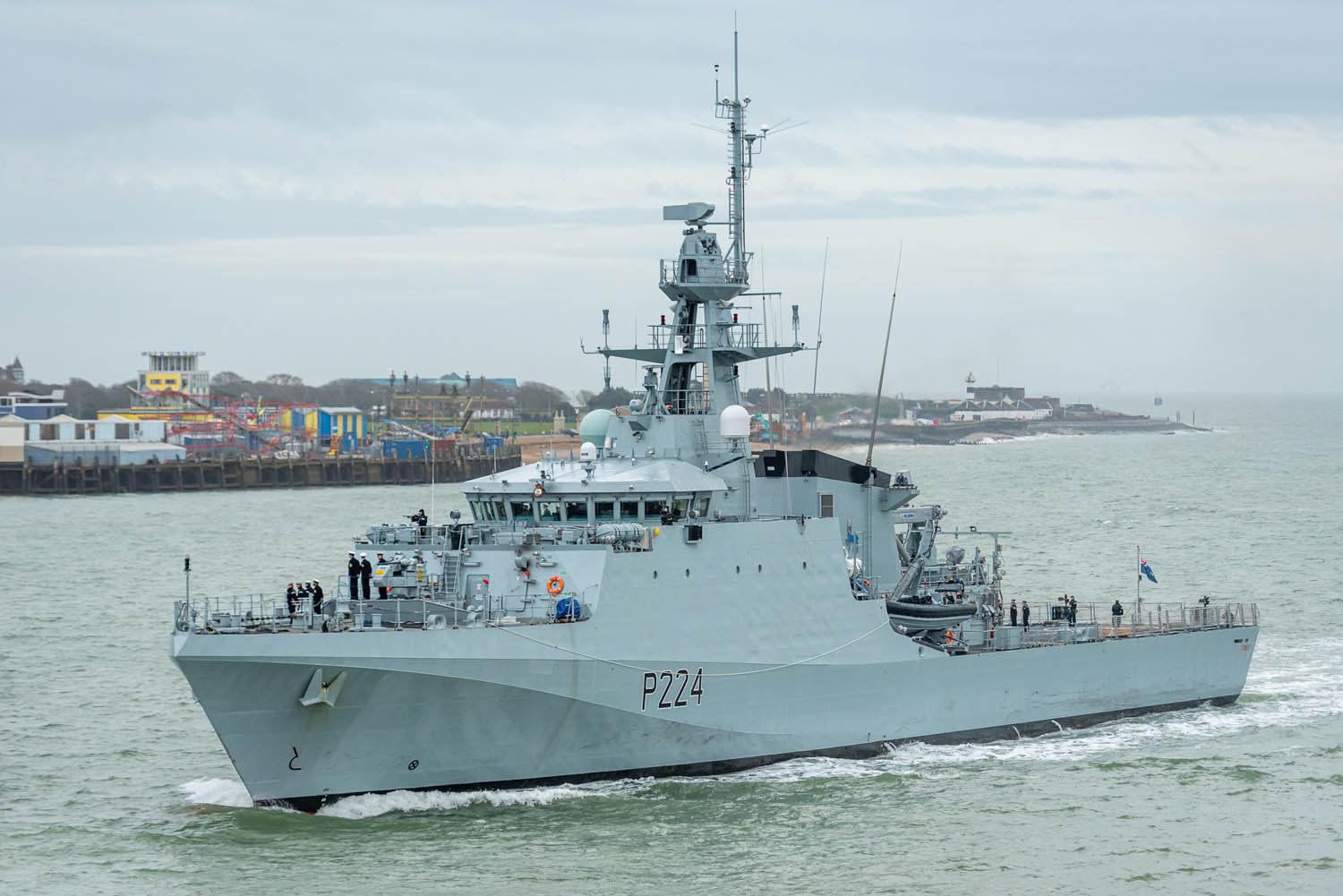
- HMS Trent entering Portsmouth for the first time

History

United Kingdom
- Name: Trent
- Ordered: August 2014
- Builder: BAE Systems Naval Ships
- Laid down: 7 October 2015 (Steel cut)
- Launched: 20 March 2018
- Sponsored by: Mrs Pamela Potts
- Christened: 13 March 2018
- Commissioned: 3 August 2020
- Home port: Portsmouth
- Identification: Pennant number: P224; IMO number: 9752072; MMSI number: 232003590; International call sign: GTRT
- Motto: Laureata per labore (Latin: "Crowned with laurels through hard work")
- Status: In active service
- Badge

General characteristics
- Class & type: Batch 2 River-class patrol vessel
- Displacement: 2,000 tonnes
- Length: 90.5 m (296 ft 11 in)
- Beam: 13 m (42 ft 8 in)
- Draught: 3.8 m (12 ft 6 in)
- Speed: 25 knots (46 km/h; 29 mph)
- Range: 5,500 nmi (10,200 km; 6,300 mi)
- Endurance: 35 days
- Boats & landing craft carried: Two rigid inflatable boats
- Troops: up to 50
- Complement: 34–50
- Sensors & processing systems: Kelvin Hughes Ltd SharpEye navigation radar; Terma Scanter 4100 2D radar; BAE CMS-1; Shared Infrastructure operating system
- Armament: 1 × 30 mm DS30B gun; 4 × 0.5" heavy machine guns; 2 × miniguns (originally fit; retired as of 2023); 2 × general purpose machine guns
- Aircraft carried: Merlin-capable flight deck; small UAVs may be embarked

HMS Trent is a Batch 2 River-class offshore patrol vessel, named after the River Trent. This is the sixth Royal Navy ship named Trent. She is the third Batch 2 River-class vessel to be commissioned and has been deployed on various overseas taskings including being forward deployed to Gibraltar for operations in the Mediterranean, the Gulf of Guinea and the Caribbean.

== Construction ==
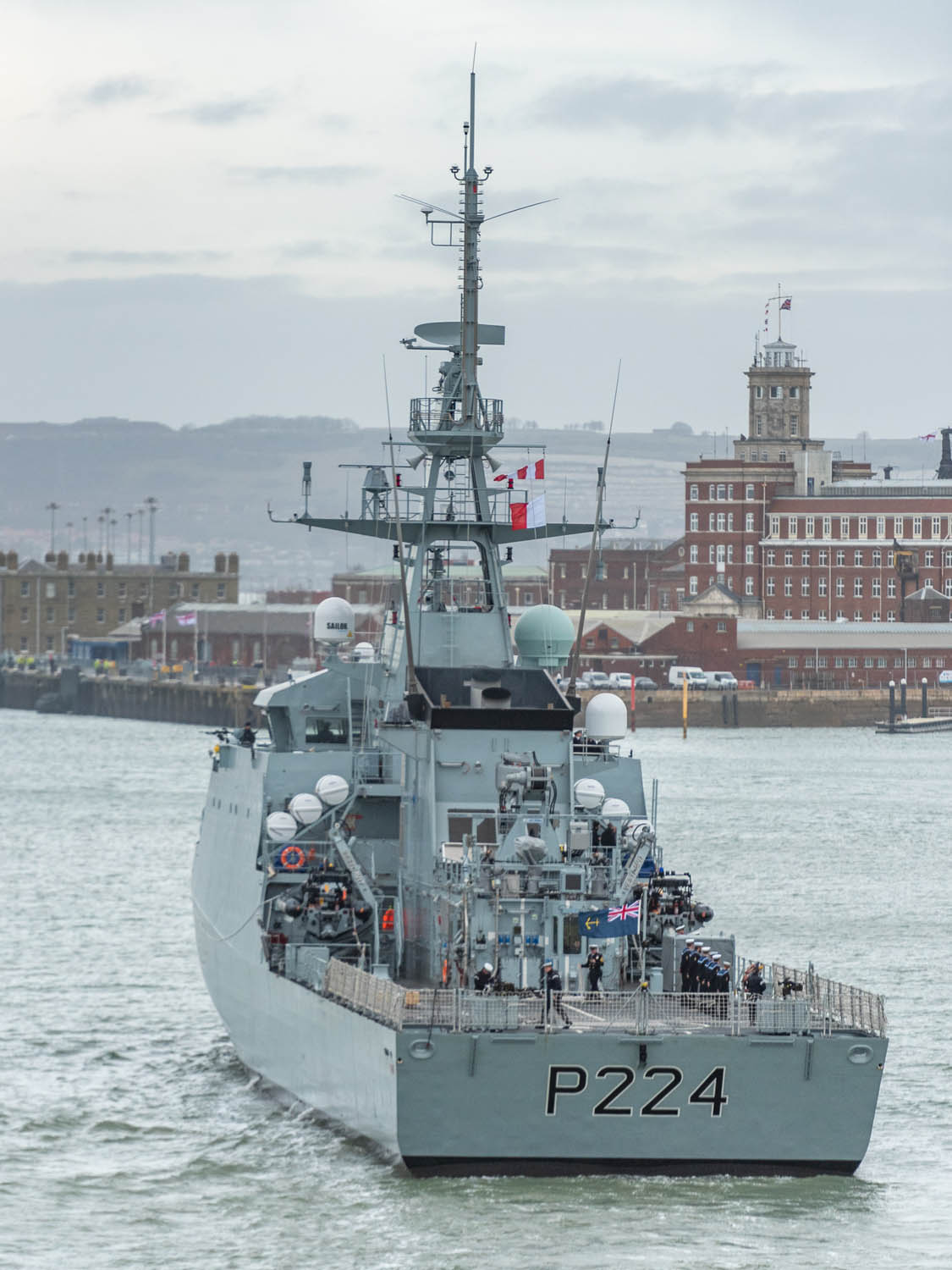
Trent making way into Portsmouth harbour

On 6 November 2013 it was announced that the Royal Navy had signed an agreement in principle to build three new offshore patrol vessels, based on the River-class design, at a fixed price of £348 million including spares and support. In August 2014, BAE Systems signed the contract to build the ships on the Clyde. The Ministry of Defence stated that the Batch 2 ships are capable of being used for constabulary duties such as "counter-terrorism, counter-piracy and anti-smuggling operations". According to BAE Systems, the vessels are designed to deploy globally, conducting anti-piracy, counter-terrorism and anti-smuggling tasks currently conducted by frigates and destroyers.

Steel was cut, marking the start of construction of Trent, on 7 October 2015 at the BAE Systems Govan shipyard in Glasgow. Trent was officially named—the equivalent to a traditional slipway launch—on the south bank of the Clyde at BAE's Govan yard on 13 March 2018, completing her first sea trials in June the following year. She made her first entry into Portsmouth Harbour on 19 December 2019.

== Operational history ==
Trent was commissioned on 3 August 2020 and deployed to the Mediterranean for NATO Operation Sea Guardian, before returning to the UK in September. The 2021 defence white paper announced that HMS Trent would be permanently based at Gibraltar as part of the Gibraltar Squadron for operations in the Mediterranean Sea and in the Gulf of Guinea. Trent arrived at Gibraltar in April 2021.

Soon after her arrival, Trent deployed to the Black Sea for training with the Ukrainian and allied navies (Operation Orbital). Later in the year, with marines from 42 Commando on board, the patrol ship deployed to the Gulf of Guinea on counter-piracy operations.

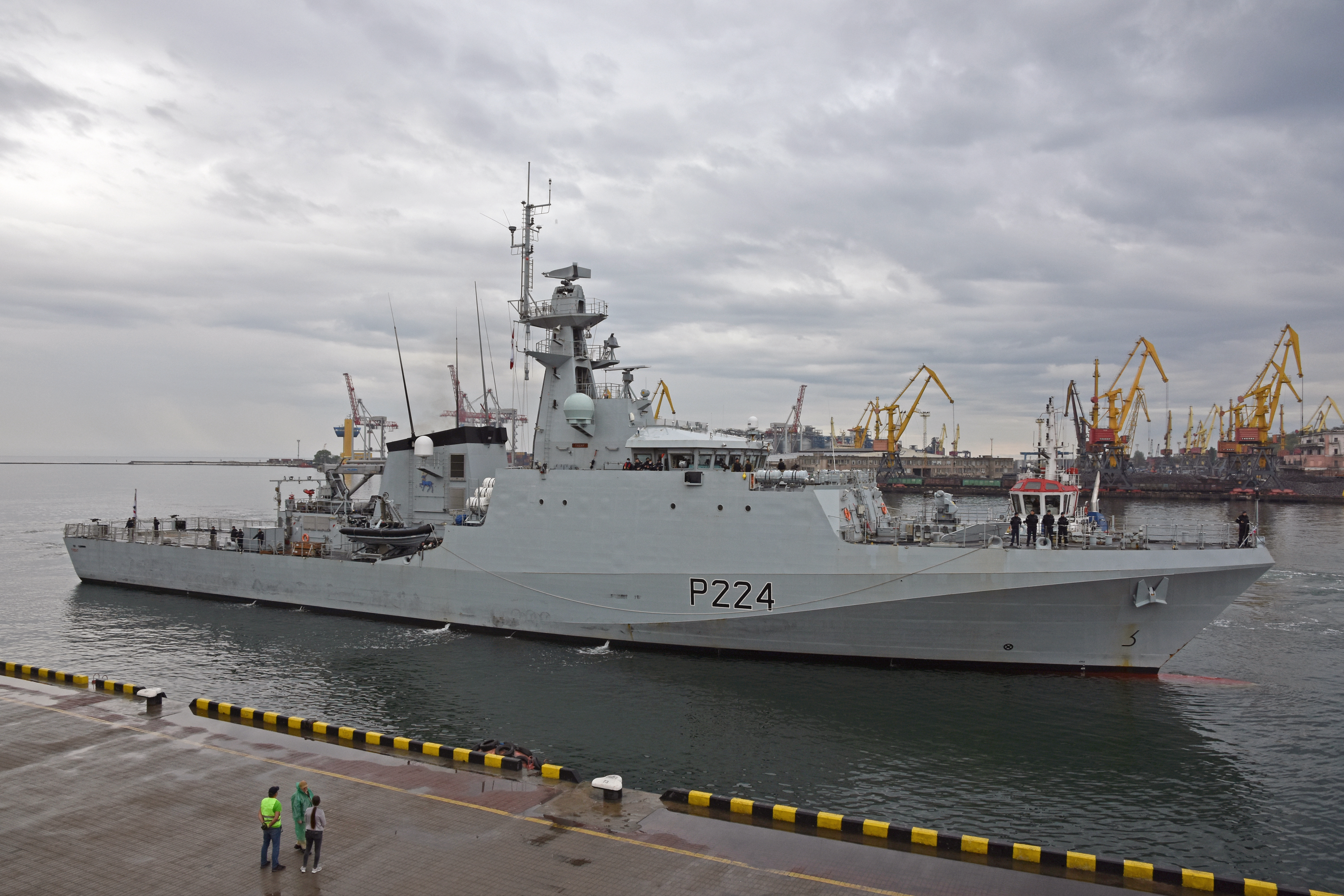
Trent on Operation Orbital, 2021

The ship went into dry dock in Gibraltar in mid-2022 for a maintenance and upgrade period and was to have returned to active operations in October. However, a further initially undisclosed problem forced her to return to dry dock shortly thereafter. That same month, the ship's commanding officer was removed from his post over alleged inappropriate texts to a female subordinate. In December the ship again returned to dry dock for an unknown reason. As of April 2023, the ship remained under maintenance at dockside.

The vessel was reported to have returned to sea in May 2023 and initiated a deployment to West Africa and the Gulf of Guinea in July. For her West Africa deployment, Trent again embarked a contingent from 42 Commando plus a Puma unmanned air vehicle team from 700X Naval Air Squadron. The ship returned to Gibraltar at the end of October.

=== Caribbean deployment 2023–2024 ===
In early December 2023, Trent deployed to the Caribbean for an extended period to assume guardship duties there while her sister ship HMS Medway underwent a maintenance period at the Gibraltar dockyard. Later that month, on 24 December, it was announced that Trent would be sent to Guyana in a show of diplomatic and military support for the former British colony. It came after neighbouring Venezuela renewed its claim for a disputed part of Guyanese territory that is rich in oil and minerals.

Subsequently, Trent, operating in conjunction with the US Coast Guard, participated in the interception of a smuggling speedboat off the US Virgin Islands which resulted in the seizure of 94 bales of narcotics weighing 2,757 kg (6,078 lb) and worth £220.56m. Two further interceptions of smuggling speedboats subsequently took place off Martinique, resulting in the combined seizure of 200 kg (440 lb) of cocaine.

In May, Trent was instrumental in a further drug seizure, in which the warship seized 2.5 tonnes of cocaine from a fleeing drug smuggling boat.

In July, the patrol vessel deployed to the Cayman Islands to provide assistance in the aftermath of Hurricane Beryl, and then in August she was deployed to the British Virgin Islands to assist after Tropical Storm Ernesto. Later in the month, Trent, again operating with the US Coast Guard about 120 nautical miles (220 km; 140 mi) south of the Dominican Republic, was involved in the seizure of another 500 kg (1,100 lb) of cocaine valued at approximately £40m. In September, the patrol ship intercepted a "narco submarine" attempting to smuggle £160 million worth of cocaine.

=== Return to Gibraltar ===
Later in the month, Trent completed her Caribbean deployment and returned to Gibraltar, stopping at Bermuda en route. In October, Trent departed Gibraltar for Malta to undertake her maintenance period there. In May 2025, Trent departed Malta following her refit. She was projected to return to the UK via Gibraltar for aviation training with the new advanced Helicopter Visual Landing Aid System (HVLAS) fitted to the vessel in her recent refit, and in preparation for another return to the Caribbean later in the year. In August 2025, HMS Trent, operating from Portsmouth, was tasked to shadow the Russian destroyer Vice-Admiral Kulakov as she transitted through the English Channel.

=== Caribbean Deployment 2025/26 ===
In October 2025, HMS Trent arrived in San Juan, Puerto Rico, joining HMS Medway, for the start of her Caribbean deployment. Later in the month, the ship was tasked to provide support for communities in the Caribbean in the aftermath of Hurricane Melissa. The ship returned to the UK in January 2026 and then redeployed back to the Caribbean in May.

Sail 250 in New Orleans

From Thursday, May 28 - Monday, June 1, 2026, HMS Trent participated in the “Sail 250” event in New Orleans, along with tall ships and active war ships from various navies. She was open for guided public tours during this period.

Drone Trials

In August, HMS Trent carried out trials with a Malloy T-150B heavy-lift drone during operations in the Caribbean. The drone is capable of lifting 68 kg, flying for up to 40 minutes, with a top speed of 60 mph. It also incorporates night and thermal imaging capabilities. The trials were carried out with personnel from 700X Naval Air Squadron.
