= Cutlass-class patrol vessel =

Class of fast patrol boat of the Royal Navy

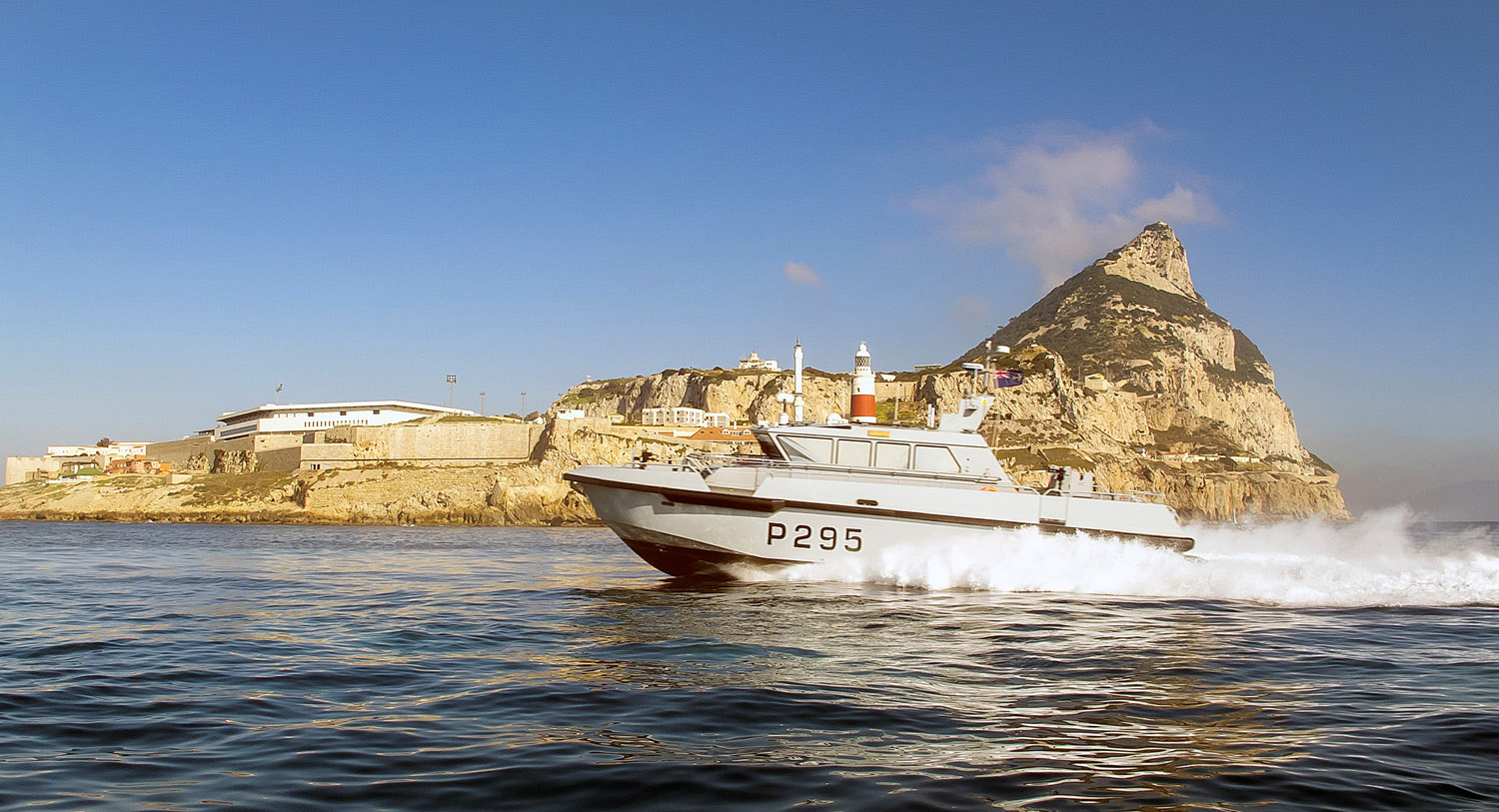
- HMS Cutlass, 2022

Class overview
- Name: Cutlass class
- Operators: Royal Navy
- Preceded by: Scimitar class
- Cost: £9.9m for two, including 4 years support
- In service: 2021–present
- Completed: 2
- Active: 2

General characteristics
- Type: Patrol boat
- Displacement: 35 t (34 long tons) (full load)
- Length: 19 m (62 ft 4 in)
- Propulsion: 3 × Volvo D13 engines (1,000 hp, 750 kW) driving 3 × MJP 350X Waterjets
- Speed: 41 knots (76 km/h; 47 mph)
- Complement: 6 personnel and up to 6 passengers
- Armament: 3 × general purpose machine guns (bow & stern-mounted)
- Aircraft carried: "Quadcopter" light reconnaissance/surveillance UAVs can be embarked

The Cutlass class is a class of fast patrol boat of the British Royal Navy.

The two vessels of this class are a commercial HPB-1900 design, built to military specifications by Merseyside-based Marine Specialised Technology at a cost of £9.9m for two (including 4 years support). The vessels are being assigned to serve in a sovereignty protection and coastal security role with the Royal Navy's Gibraltar Squadron. The first vessel, HMS Cutlass, arrived in Gibraltar in November 2021 while the second, HMS Dagger, arrived in Gibraltar in March 2022.

As of 2023, the Cutlass class are the smallest commissioned vessels in the Royal Navy, being slightly lighter, in terms of displacement, than the Royal Navy's survey vessel HMS Magpie.

In 2025, "Quadcopter" light reconnaissance/surveillance UAVs, operated by a team from 700 Naval Air Squadron, were integrated into the operations of the Cutlass-class vessels and the Gibraltar Squadron.

== Vessels in the class ==
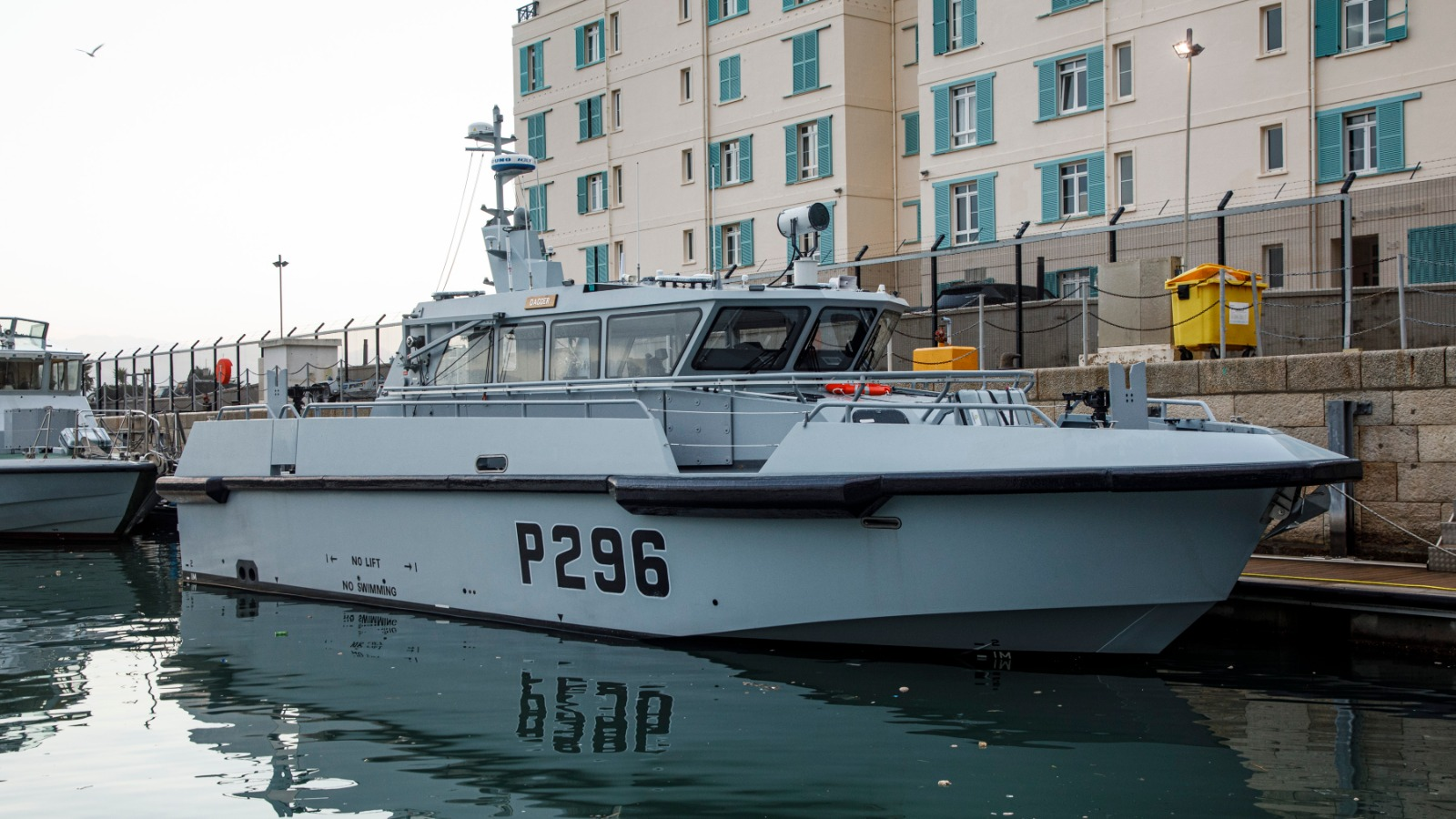
HMS Dagger at HM Naval Base, Gibraltar

Name	Pennant No.	Builder	Laid down	Launched	Commissioned	Status
Cutlass	P295	Marine Specialised Technology, Merseyside	July 2020		4 May 2022	Active
Dagger	P296	Marine Specialised Technology, Merseyside	July 2020		14 July 2022	Active

== See also ==
- Scimitar-class patrol vessel
- Archer-class patrol vessel
- Raptor-class patrol boat
- CB90-class fast assault craft
- Sea-class workboat
