= Bernard Currey =

Royal Navy Admiral (1862–1936)

Admiral Bernard Currey
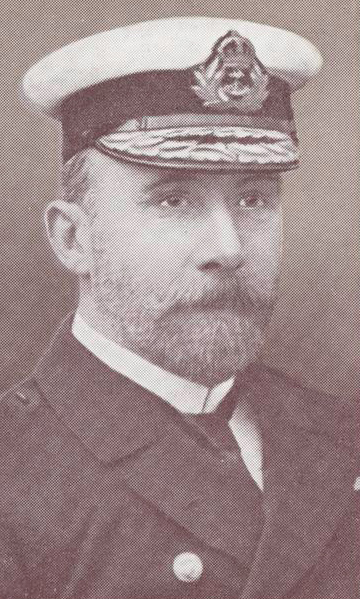
- Currey circa 1910s
- Born: 11 May 1862
- Died: 6 June 1936 (aged 74)
- Military career
- Allegiance: United Kingdom
- Branch: Royal Navy
- Service years: 1876-1919
- Rank: Admiral
- Commands: HMS Scylla; HMS Terpsichore; HMS Good Hope; HMS Black Prince; HMS Agamemnon; HMS Exmouth; 5th Battle Squadron
- Conflicts: World War I

Admiral Bernard Currey (11 May 1862 – 6 June 1936) was a Royal Navy officer who commanded the 5th Battle Squadron.

== Naval career ==
Currey was the son of Charles E. Currey, of Malling Deanery, Lewes. He joined the Royal Navy in 1876. He was promoted to lieutenant on 11 November 1882, and commander on 30 June 1895. In early 1901 he was posted to HMS Royal Arthur, flagship of the Australia Station, and transferred to HMS Blake for voyage home, before promotion to captain on 30 June 1901. He became commanding officer of the protected cruiser HMS Scylla in 1904, commanding officer of the protected cruiser HMS Terpsichore later that year and commanding officer of the armoured cruiser HMS Good Hope at the end of the year. He went on to be commanding officer of the cruiser HMS Black Prince in 1906, commanding officer of the battleship HMS Agamemnon in 1908 and commanding officer of the battleship HMS Exmouth in 1910.

Currey became Rear Admiral, Home Fleet and President of Submarine Committee in 1913. He served World War I as Commander of the 5th Battle Squadron in the Channel Fleet from 1914 and then became Senior Naval Officer in charge of Gibraltar in 1915 before retiring in 1919.

== Family ==
Currey married at Christ church, Lancaster Gate, on 29 November 1902, Maud de Vahl, daughter of Arthur D. S. de Vahl, of Hove.
