= Sturdee =

Sturdee may refer to:

- Admiral of the Fleet Sir Frederick Charles Doveton Sturdee, 1st Baronet, GCB, KCMG, CVO (9 June 1859 – 7 May 1925)
- Lieutenant General Sir Vernon Ashton Hobart Sturdee KBE, CB, DSO (16 April 1890 – 25 May 1966), his nephew
- Rear Admiral Arthur Rodney Barry Sturdee (1919–2009), cousin of the above

== See also ==
- Sturdee baronets, in the Baronetcy of the United kingdom
- Sturdee's pipistrelle, a bat species
