= Pacific 24 =

Military speedboat

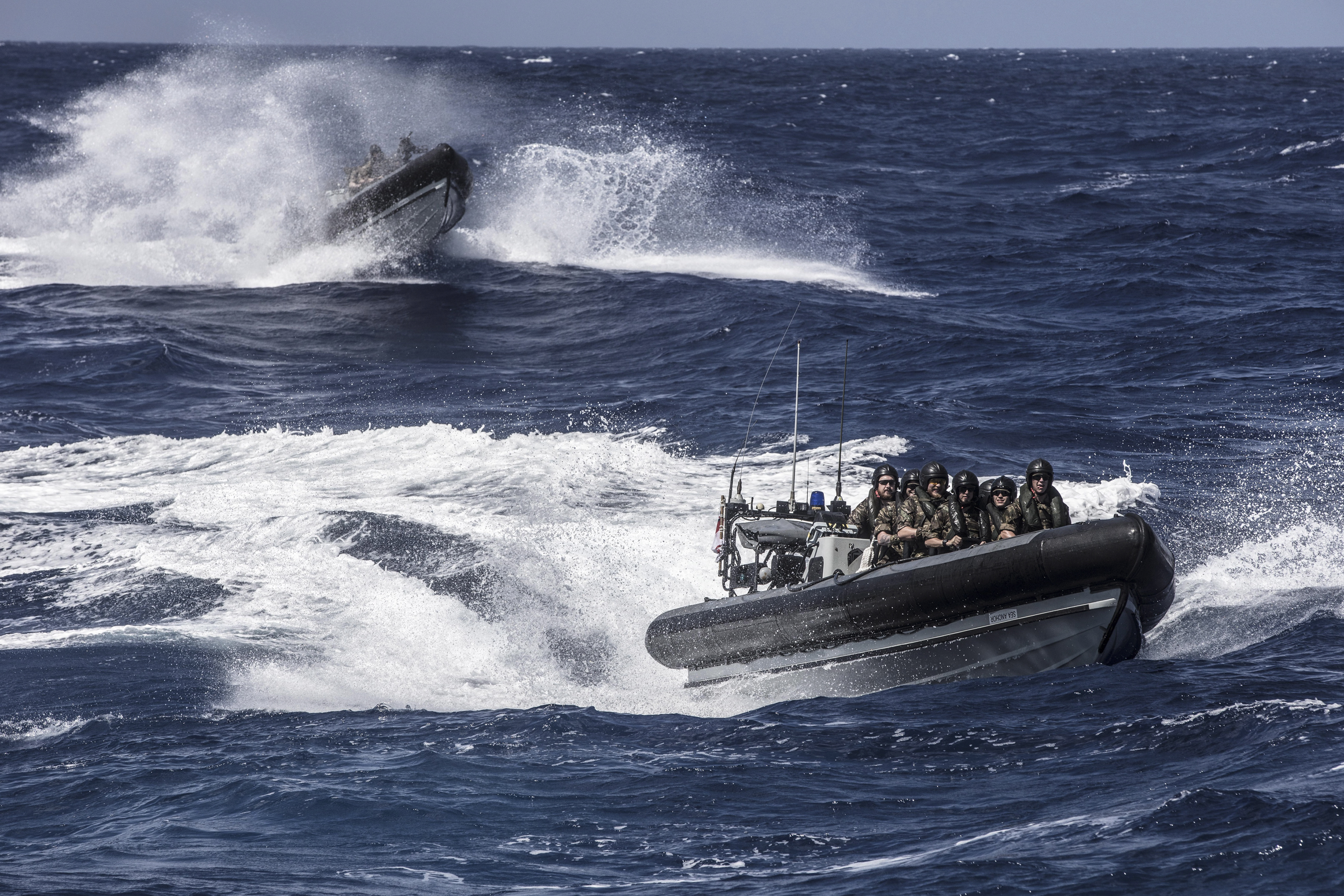
- Pacific 24 Mark 4s from HMS Sutherland in March 2018

Class overview
- Builders: BAE Systems
- Operators: UK Government
- Active: 60 (Royal Navy and Royal Fleet Auxiliary)

General characteristics
- Type: RIB
- Length: 7.8 metres
- Beam: 2.6 metres
- Propulsion: Options include outboard petrol and inboard diesel with stern drive and water jet
- Speed: 38 knots
- Range: Typical range at 30 knots: 150 Nm
- Complement: Crew: 2, Passengers: Up to 6

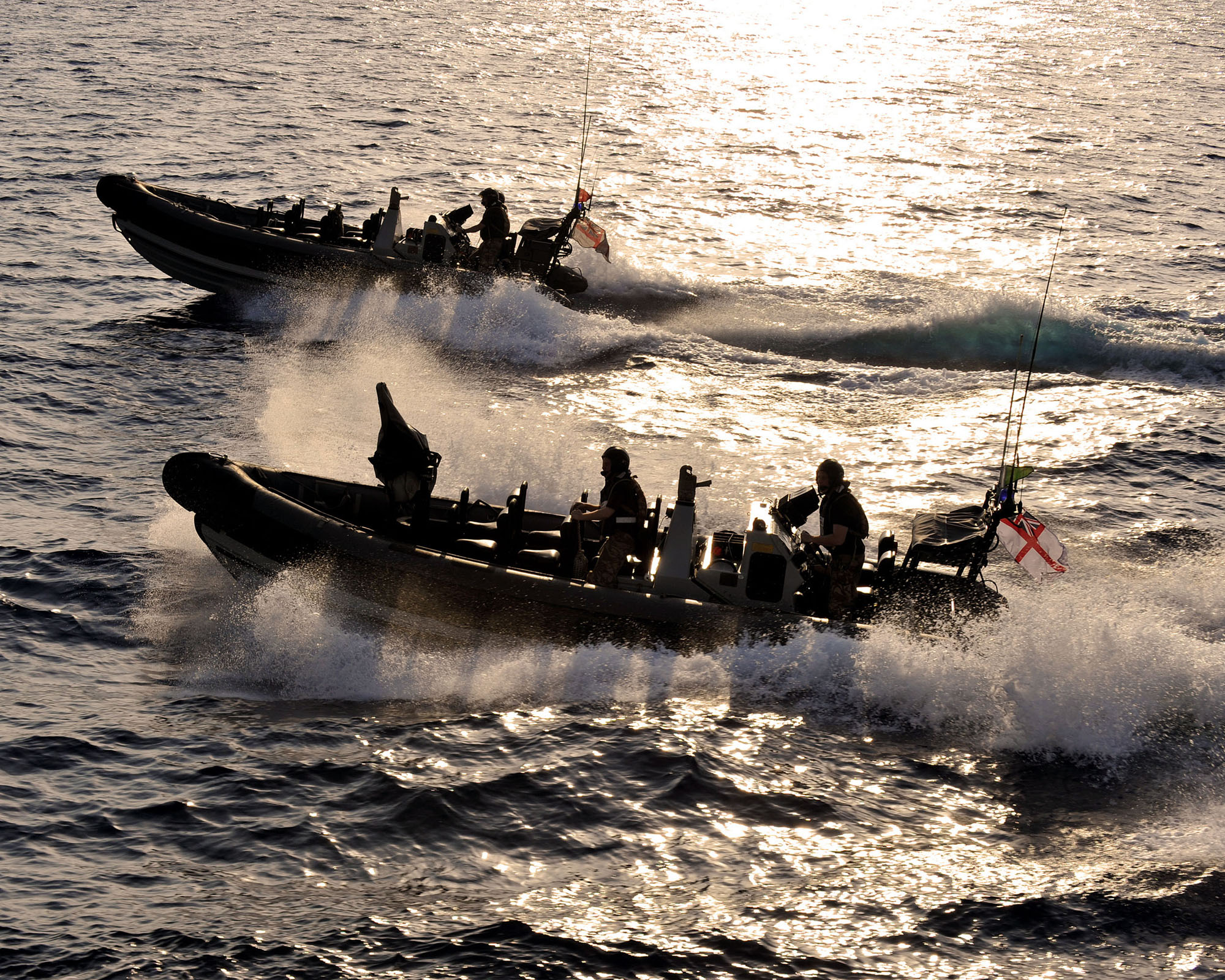
Having completed a successful ship boarding exercise, Royal Marines from Type 22 frigate HMS Cornwall leave the scene aboard the ship's Pacific 24 seaboats.

The Pacific 24 is a rigid inflatable boat made by BAE Systems in the UK, one of a range of small boats made by the company. As of 2020 it was the latest Pacific craft within the BAE Halmatic range, and has been proven in service with the UK MOD, UK police and overseas military and paramilitary organisations. It was designed to replace the Pacific 22. About 60 Pacific 24s are in service with the Royal Navy and Royal Fleet Auxiliary, including an uncrewed version of the boat which is controlled from a parent Navy ship or another location. This boat began tests in 2020 and a few such boats may ultimately be deployed for special missions.

== Usage ==
The boats are mostly used for fast rescue, anti-piracy and counter-narcotics missions, and are the standard boats used by Royal Navy and Royal Fleet Auxiliary ships.

They have a "dry running" capability, allowing their engines to be started out of the water, while still attached to a ship's davits.

== UK Ministry of Defence ==
In December 2015 the MoD placed an order for 60 Pacific 24 boats as part of a £13.5m contract for use with vessels such as the Queen Elizabeth Class aircraft carriers and the new River class offshore patrol vessels. These new boats will include high-performance shock-absorbing seats that minimise crew fatigue, allowing them to travel up to six times the distance.

Building was to start in early 2016, and was expected to take four years to complete.

== Operators ==
- Ministry of Defence (United Kingdom)
  - Royal Navy
  - Royal Fleet Auxiliary
- Various UK police services
- Various UK rescue authorities
- Other UK and International Agencies

== See also ==
Boats of similar role and configuration:

- Short Range Prosecutor
