= 5th Destroyer Squadron =

Royal Navy 5th Destroyer Squadron
- Active: January 1952 – February 2002
- Disbanded: 2002
- Country: United Kingdom
- Allegiance: British Armed Forces
- Branch: Royal Navy
- Type: Squadron

The Royal Navy 5th Destroyer Squadron was a naval unit of the Royal Navy (RN) from 1952 to 2002.

== History ==
After World War II, the British Royal Navy reverted to its previous layout and command structure in February 1947; the 5th Destroyer Flotilla of the Home Fleet was reactivated, it was re-designated 5th Destroyer Squadron in January 1952, and succeeded by the 5th Destroyer Squadron. The Admiralty controlled global deployment of the Navy until 1964, when that department was abolished and replaced by the new Navy Department, within the newly formed Ministry of Defence. These geographic commands usually comprised fleets, squadrons, flotillas, and single ships. In 1954, major re-structuring of the composition of the Royal Navy was undertaken; leading to downsizing, and warships being rotated between the various fleets and stations. Between 1954 and 1971, many commands were either abolished or amalgamated into larger geographic commands. By the end of 1966, all Royal Navy squadrons were disbanded. Squadrons remaining in the Far East Fleet were renamed, 1st, 2nd, and 3rd Far East Destroyer Squadrons. No squadrons existed in the Western Fleet for the period 1967 to 1971. In November 1971, nearly all British naval forces were brought under the command of a single fleet, whose headquarters was at Northwood, Middlesex, then under the control of Commander-in-Chief Fleet (CinC-Fleet). From 1981 to 2002, both Type 42 destroyers and frigates during this period were deployed to squadrons and the same ship class. In peacetime, the squadron's role was usually administrative, and during the last two decades of its existence, the squadron was based at HMNB Portsmouth.

== Organisational changes ==
Note: Command structure organisational changes took place within Royal Navy post war period, the term Flotilla was previously applied to a tactical unit until 1951, which led to the creation of three specific Flag Officers, Flotillas responsible for the Eastern, Home, and Mediterranean fleets, the existing destroyer flotillas were re-organised now as administrative squadrons.

== Operational deployments ==
Included:

from	to	deployed to	additional notes
January 1952	August 1954	Home Fleet	on general assignments
September 1954	June 1955	Mediterranean Fleet	on general assignments
July 1955	February 1956	Home Fleet	on general assignments
March 1956	January 1957	Mediterranean Fleet	on general assignments
February 1957	August 1957	Home Fleet	on general assignments
September 1957	June 1958	Mediterranean Fleet	on general assignments
July 1958	December 1958	Home Fleet	on general assignments
January 1959	December 1959	disbanded	undergoing re-fits
January 1961	August 1961	Home Fleet	on general assignments
September 1961	April 1962	Mediterranean Fleet	on general assignments
May 1962	January 1963	Home Fleet	on general assignments
February 1963	November 1980	disbanded	
December 1980	April 1992	Second Flotilla, HMNB Portsmouth	Type 42 group
May 1992	February 2002	Fleet, HMNB Portsmouth	Type 42 group

== Composition ==
Included:

(United Kingdom) , Home Fleet, 1952

- HMS Solebay (leader)
- HMS Gabbard
- HMS St. James
- HMS St. Kitts
- HMS Sluys - (September 1952)

(United Kingdom) , Home Fleet, 1953

- HMS Solebay (leader) - (July 1953)
- HMS Gabbard - (February 1954)
- HMS St. James - (June 1953)
- HMS St. Kitts - (July 1953)

(United Kingdom) , Home Fleet, to August 1954

- HMS Duchess (leader)
- HMS Decoy - (January 1959)
- HMS Diamond
- HMS Diana

(United Kingdom) , Mediterranean Fleet, September 1954 – June 1955

- HMS Duchess (leader)
- HMS Decoy - (January 1959)
- HMS Diamond
- HMS Diana

(United Kingdom) , Home Fleet, July 1955 – February 1956

- HMS Duchess (leader)
- HMS Decoy - (January 1959)
- HMS Diamond
- HMS Diana

(United Kingdom) , Mediterranean Fleet, March 1956 – January 1957

- HMS Duchess (leader)
- HMS Decoy - (January 1959)
- HMS Diamond
- HMS Diana

(United Kingdom) , Home Fleet, February 1957 – August 1957

- HMS Duchess (leader)
- HMS Decoy - (January 1959)
- HMS Diamond
- HMS Diana

(United Kingdom) , Mediterranean Fleet, September 1957 – June 1958

- HMS Duchess (leader)
- HMS Decoy - (January 1959)
- HMS Diamond
- HMS Diana

(United Kingdom) , Home Fleet, July 1958 – December 1958

- HMS Duchess (leader)
- HMS Decoy - (January 1959)
- HMS Diamond
- HMS Diana

(United Kingdom) , Home Fleet, January 1961 – August 1961

- HMS Duchess (leader)
- HMS Diamond
- HMS Diana
- HMS Crossbow
- HMS Battleaxe, (August 1962)

(United Kingdom) , Home Fleet, September 1961 – April 1962

- HMS Duchess (leader)
- HMS Diamond
- HMS Diana
- HMS Crossbow
- HMS Battleaxe, (August 1962)

(United Kingdom) , Home Fleet, May 1962 – January 1963

- HMS Duchess (leader)
- HMS Diamond
- HMS Diana
- HMS Crossbow
- HMS Battleaxe, (August 1962)

(United Kingdom) , Second Flotilla, Portsmouth, December 1980 – April 1992

- HMS Exeter, (leader), (1980–84), (1989–96)
- HMS Southampton, (August 1981 - February 2002)
- HMS Southampton, (leader) (1985–89)
- HMS Cardiff (March 1986 - February 2002)
- HMS Cardiff, (leader) (1998–2002)
- HMS Liverpool, (May 1982 - February 2002)
- HMS Nottingham, (November 1982 - February 2002)
- HMS Manchester, (November 1982 - February 2002)
- HMS Gloucester, (May 1985 - February 2002)
- HMS Newcastle, (March 1986 - February 2002)

(United Kingdom) , Fleet, Portsmouth, May 1992 – February 2002

- HMS Exeter, (leader), (1980–84), (1989–96)
- HMS Southampton, (August 1981 - February 2002)
- HMS Southampton, (Leader) (1985–89)
- HMS Cardiff, (March 1986 - February 2002)
- HMS Cardiff, (leader) (1998–2002)
- HMS Liverpool (May 1982 - February 2002)
- HMS Nottingham (November 1982 - February 2002)
- HMS Manchester (November 1982 - February 2002)
- HMS Gloucester (May 1985 - February 2002)
- HMS Newcastle (March 1986 - February 2002)

== Squadron commander ==
commanders	lead ship	dates
Captain Geoffrey Thistleton-Smith	HMS Solebay	January – April 1952
Captain John G. Hamilton	HMS Solebay	April 1952 – 1953
Captain John P. Scatchard and unknown	HMS Solebay / HMS Duchess	1954 – 1957
Captain Edward A.S. Bailey	HMS Duchess	September 1958 – 1959
unknown	HMS Duchess	1960 – 1963
Disbanded		1964 – 1979
Captain Jeremy C. Dreyer	HMS Exeter	December 1980 – February 1982
Captain Hugh M. Balfour	HMS Exeter	February 1982 – June 1983
Captain George M. Tullis	HMS Exeter	June 1983 – July 1984
Captain David S. Dobson	HMS Exeter / HMS Southampton	July 1984 – October 1985
Captain C. Christopher Morgan	HMS Southampton	October 1985 – 1987
Captain Stephen Taylor	HMS Southampton	1987 – January 1989
Captain Nigel R. Essenhigh	HMS Exeter	April 1989 – August 1991
Captain John R. Cartwright	HMS Exeter	August 1991 – May 1993
Captain John R. Hance	HMS Exeter	May 1993 – 1995
Captain Paul W. Herrington	HMS Exeter	1995 – December 1996
Captain Hugh A.H.G. Edleston	HMS Exeter / HMS Cardiff	December 1996 – July 1998
Captain Stephen Jermy	HMS Cardiff	July 1998 – December 1999
Captain Neil Morisetti	HMS Cardiff	December 1999 – June 2001
Captain Timothy P. Fraser	HMS Cardiff	June 2001 – February 2002 (also Capt D3 from Nov 2001)

Of note, for the last few months of its existence, Command of the 5th Destroyer Squadron was combined with that of the 3rd Destroyer Squadron, as the 'Commander of the 3rd and 5th Destroyer Squadrons' prior to abolition of both squadrons and the incorporation of all the Type 42 destroyers within the newly established Portsmouth Flotilla.

== See also ==
- List of squadrons and flotillas of the Royal Navy
- Stone frigate

== Sources ==
- Mackie. Colin (2017). Senior Royal Navy Appointments from 1865: Gulabin. http://www.Gulabin.com/.
- Smith. Gordon and Watson, Graham. (2015) The Royal Navy, post 1945. Royal Navy Organisation and Ship Deployments 1947–2013. https://Naval-History.net.
