= HMAS Vendetta =

Two ships of the Royal Australian Navy (RAN) have been named HMAS Vendetta.

- HMAS Vendetta (D69) was a V-class destroyer. Commissioned into the Royal Navy in 1917, she served until 1933, when she was transferred to the RAN. The destroyer operated throughout World War II, was paid off in late 1945, and sold for scrap.
- HMAS Vendetta (D08) was a Daring-class destroyer commissioned in 1958. The ship operated during the Vietnam War, and was paid off in 1979.

== Battle honours ==
Nine battle honours were awarded to ships named HMAS Vendetta:

- Libya 1940–41
- Matapan 1941
- Greece 1941
- Crete 1941
- Mediterranean 1941
- Pacific 1943–45
- New Guinea 1943–44
- Malaysia 1964–66
- Vietnam 1969–70
