= K215 =

K215 or K-215 may refer to:

- K-215 (Kansas highway), a state highway in Kansas
- HMS Nith (K215), a former UK Royal Navy ship
