= HMAS Duchess =

RN/RAN Daring-class destroyer (1951–1977)

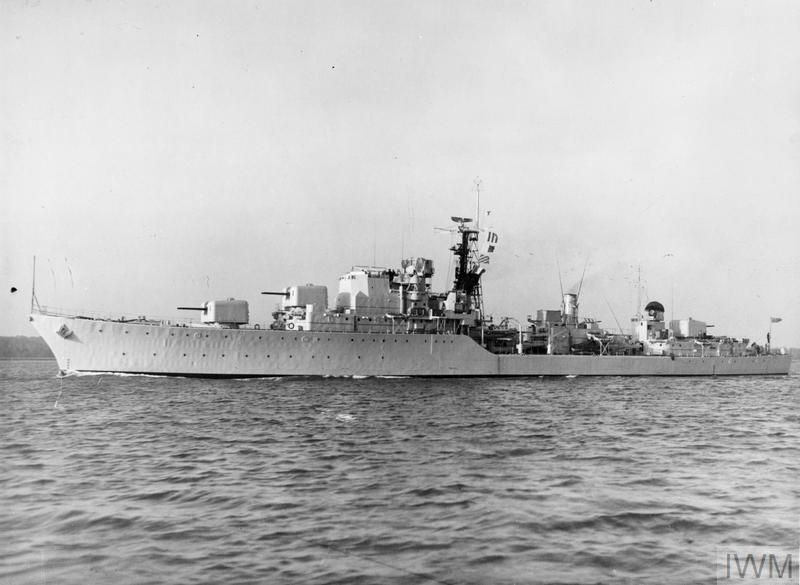
- Duchess at sea in November 1952

History

United Kingdom
- Name: Duchess
- Builder: John I. Thornycroft and Company
- Laid down: 8 July 1948
- Launched: 9 April 1951
- Commissioned: 23 October 1952
- Motto: "Duci Non Trahi" (To Be Led But Not Dragged)
- Fate: Loaned to RAN in 1964, sold 1972

Australia
- Name: Duchess
- Acquired: 19 April 1964
- Commissioned: 8 May 1964
- Decommissioned: 23 October 1977
- Reclassified: Training ship (1974)
- Nickname(s): "Her Ladyship"
- Honours and awards: Battle honours: Malaysia 1965–66
- Fate: Sold for scrap, 7 May 1980
- Badge

General characteristics
- Class & type: Daring-class destroyer
- Displacement: 2,950 tons standard; 3,580 tons full load
- Length: 390 ft (120 m) overall; 366 feet (112 m) between perpendiculars
- Beam: 43 ft (13 m)
- Draught: 17 ft (5.2 m) maximum
- Propulsion: 2 × Foster Wheeler oil-fuelled boilers; 2 × English Electric geared turbines; 54,000 shaft horsepower (40,000 kW); 2 shafts
- Speed: 30.5 knots (56.5 km/h; 35.1 mph) maximum; 20 knots (37 km/h; 23 mph) cruising
- Range: 1,700 nautical miles (3,100 km; 2,000 mi) at 30.5 knots (56.5 km/h; 35.1 mph); 4,400 nautical miles (8,100 km; 5,100 mi) at 20 knots (37 km/h; 23 mph)
- Complement: 278 as destroyer; 243 as training ship
- Armament: At launch: 6 × QF 4.5 inch /45 (113 mm) Mark V guns in 3 twin mountings UD Mark VI; 4 × 40 mm /60 Bofors A/A in 2 twin mounts STAAG Mark II; 2 × 40 mm /60 Bofors A/A in 1 twin mount Mark V; 10 × 21 in (533 mm) torpedo tubes (2 x 5-tube mounts); 1 × Squid anti submarine mortar Mark 10; 4 × 3-pounder saluting guns; Modifications: Aft torpedo mount removed 1959-60; Midships torpedo mount, Aft 4.5 inch twin mounting, and Squid mortar removed 1974

HMAS Duchess was a Daring-class destroyer that served in the Royal Navy as HMS Duchess from 1952 to 1964, and in the Royal Australian Navy (RAN) from 1964 to 1980. She was laid down by John I. Thornycroft and Company, and commissioned into the Royal Navy in 1952.

Initially assigned to the Home Fleet, Duchess spent her early career on exercises and port visits. She was involved in celebrations for the coronation of Queen Elizabeth II during 1953, and escorted the royal yacht Britannia in 1954. The destroyer was reassigned to the Mediterranean Fleet in late 1954, and was involved in exercises, port visits, and anti-weapons-smuggling patrols of Cyprus. During the 1956 Suez Crisis, Duchess operated as plane guard and escort to the British carrier force, and was the last ship to leave Port Said after the British-French invasion failed. The destroyer was reassigned to the Home Fleet in early 1957, then was sent back to the Mediterranean as leader of the 5th Destroyer Squadron later that year. A modernisation refit ran from late 1958 to the start of 1961, after which, Duchess resumed operations with the Mediterranean Fleet. In 1963, tensions leading to the Indonesia–Malaysia confrontation resulted in Duchess being assigned to the Far East Fleet as part of a strengthening of British assets in South East Asia.

Following the 1964 Melbourne-Voyager collision, Duchess was loaned to the RAN as a temporary replacement for Voyager. The ship was deployed to the Far East Strategic Reserve throughout the 1960s, and operated as an escort for the Vietnam War troopship Sydney on several occasions. The original four-year loan was extended to 1972, at which point the ship was purchased outright by the Australian government. Duchess was converted into a training ship during 1973 and 1974, and spent the rest of her career operating on midshipman training cruises in Australian, New Zealand, and South Pacific waters. Duchess was replaced in the training role in 1977, and was decommissioned. The destroyer was sold for scrap in 1980.

== Design and construction ==
The Daring class was an evolution of the Battle-class destroyer; larger and with a heavier armament built around three twin turrets. Sixteen Darings were provisionally ordered on 20 July 1944, as part of the 1944 wartime construction programme. Duchess was the last of eight to have her order confirmed, on 29 March 1945, the other eight were later cancelled as unnecessary due to the end of World War II. Their size and capability made the ships capable of performing duties previously restricted to light cruisers, and as the destroyer classification was initially considered inappropriate, they were referred to as "Daring-class warships" for the first part of their careers.

As designed, the Daring-class ships had a standard displacement of 2,950 tons, with a full load displacement of 3,580 tons. Length was 390 feet (120 m) overall and 366 feet (112 m) between perpendiculars, with a beam of 43 feet (13 m) and a maximum draught of 17 feet (5.2 m). Propulsion machinery consisted of two oil-fuelled boilers (for Duchess, these were supplied by Foster Wheeler), connected to Parsons double reduction geared turbines from English Electric, which supplied 54,000 shaft horsepower (40,000 kW) to the ship's two propeller shafts. Top speed was 30.5 knots (56.5 km/h; 35.1 mph), with an effective range of 1,700 nautical miles (3,100 km; 2,000 mi), while a cruising speed of 20 knots (37 km/h; 23 mph) allowed the ship to cover 4,400 nautical miles (8,100 km; 5,100 mi). Duchess, along with three of her sister ships, were fitted with alternating current internal electrics; a break from Royal Navy practice. The intended ship's company for Duchess was 278.

The main armament of a Daring-class destroyer consisted of six QF 4.5-inch Mk I – V naval guns, arranged in three twin turrets, two located forward, the third aft. For anti-aircraft warfare, the ships were fitted with four to six 40 mm Bofors guns: a reduction from the wartime-intended eight. Both main and anti-aircraft guns were radar-controlled. Two 5-tube launchers for 21 inch (533 mm) torpedoes were installed, along with a Squid anti-submarine mortar.

Duchess was laid down by John I. Thornycroft and Company of Woolston at Southampton on 8 July 1948. (Note: 8 July is the date of laying down listed by the British Ministry of Defence Naval Historical Branch. However, some sources give 2 July as the date.) Construction of the Daring class was a transition away from riveting as a method of hull fabrication: some ships had a mix of riveting and welding, while Duchess's hull was all-welded. She was launched on 9 April 1951 by the Countess Mountbatten of Burma, and commissioned into the Royal Navy on 23 October 1952.

== Operational history ==
=== Royal Navy ===
==== 1953–1956 ====
Duchess was initially assigned to the British Home Fleet in January 1953. During January, the ship was involved in training exercises with other Home Fleet units. On 26 January, while alongside in Portland Harbour, a furnace explosion and oil fire in A boiler room killed a stoker and severely burned three others. Although able to sail that afternoon, it took a further ten days of dockyard work to repair the damage. During February and March, Duchess and other ships of the Home Fleet sailed to Gibraltar for exercises. Most of April was taken up with self-maintenance, and May was spent on further training. At the end of May, Duchess, Daring, and Swiftsure sailed to London, where they participated in the opening celebrations of the coronation of Queen Elizabeth II. After a brief visit to the Isle of Wight, Duchess sailed to Spithead for the Coronation Fleet Review, which occurred on 15 June. After the review, Duchess, Swiftsure, and Agincourt visited east coast ports before sailing to Invergordon for fleet exercises. During the exercises, Duchess was plane guard for the carrier Eagle. Duchess returned to Portsmouth in July, underwent six weeks of maintenance, then sailed on 1 September to rejoin Eagle and other ships for exercises in the Denmark Strait. The exercise ended on 3 October, and after transporting personnel of 812 Naval Air Squadron to Loch Goyle, Duchess joined Eagle while the latter undertook flying training. On 6 October, a helicopter crashed while attempting to deliver mail to the destroyer: Duchess' seaboat was able to rescue one of the two flight crew, while the other sank with the helicopter. Duchess continued to accompany Eagle until 24 October, when she detached to return to Portsmouth. The rest of 1953, along with most of January 1954, was spent in refit.

On 5 February, Duchess joined units of the Home Fleet on the Spring Training Cruise. The cruise included multi-national exercises in the Mediterranean, a port visit to Oran, and a joint Home-Mediterranean Fleets exercise. Duchess returned to Portsmouth on 23 March. On 29 April, the destroyer departed for Gibraltar to meet the royal yacht Britannia, which was carrying Queen Elizabeth II on the final legs of her Commonwealth Tour. Duchess was part of the escort force until Britannia reached the Thames Estuary on 13 May. The destroyer then proceeded to Invergordon for Home Fleet exercises. On 19 June, Duchess and sister ship HMS Diamond were detached for a three-week flag-showing cruise around the Baltic Sea. Port visits were made to Oslo, Copenhagen, and Stockholm before Duchess returned to Portsmouth. On 31 August, the ship was paid off and recommissioned. She was reassigned to the Mediterranean Fleet, and sailed on 10 September for Malta. On 15 October, Duchess was part of a demonstration of naval power for the Emperor of Ethiopia. The rest of the year was spent on exercises, including NATO exercise Novex 54, along with port visits to Elba with the cruiser Jamaica in November. In early January 1955, Jamaica and Duchess made a formal visit to Algiers, which was then followed by more exercises. On 24 March, while moored at Naples, Duchess was rammed by the United States merchant ship SS Excambion. Damage to the destroyer included punctured hull plating on the starboard bow, impact damage to the starboard stern plates where the collision forced them into the wharf, and damage to the superstructure. Temporary repairs were effected, and the destroyer was able to sail to the Malta Dockyard on 30 March. Repairs took most of April, and it was not until 22 May that the ship was deployed again, on a cruise to the eastern Mediterranean. Duchess visited Istanbul, Alexandria, and Cyprus before returning to Malta's Grand Harbour on 22 June. Two days later, with her Mediterranean deployment at an end, Duchess departed for Portsmouth via Gibraltar. On her 1 July arrival, the destroyer was docked for maintenance.

Resuming operations on 28 September, Duchess sailed to Scottish waters for exercises: first anti-submarine and torpedo firing training off Clyde, then plane guard duties near Rosyth while Eagle's aircraft practiced high-altitude intercepts. After a visit to Hamburg, the destroyer returned to Portland. Exercises and port visits continued into 1956, and on 21 February, Duchess paid off and recommissioned at Portsmouth Dockyard. On 3 March, the destroyer sailed to rejoin the Mediterranean Fleet. After a series of working up exercises, Duchess participated in the 60-ship Exercise Medflex Dragon in April. During the exercise, the naval correspondent for The Daily Telegraph was convinced by the officers to place a small article in the paper jokingly asking for "any spare coronets" to decorate the wardroom with. In response, Anne, Duchess of Westminster, arranged to have her coronet supplied to the destroyer. Medflex Dragon concluded on 20 April, and Duchess underwent six weeks of maintenance. Port visits to Istanbul and Golcuck followed, along with a stint patrolling the Cyprus coastline to intercept Greek weapons smugglers. She returned to Malta in mid-July, and was in Grand Harbour when the Suez Canal was claimed and nationalised by Egypt.

==== Suez Crisis ====
The Mediterranean Fleet began gearing up to retaliate, with Duchess undertaking shore bombardment and convoy escort training during August and September, and also serving as plane guard to Eagle as the carrier worked up. On 29 October, Duchess left Malta to join the escort of the carriers Eagle, Albion, and Bulwark. The carrier force arrived off the Egyptian coast on 31 October, and on 1 November, airstrikes commenced. During this, Duchess was plane guard for Eagle. On 6 November, the joint British-French invasion commenced, with the destroyer escorting one of the landing craft groups into shore, then standing by off Port Said for anti-air and anti-submarine defence. During 7 and 8 November, Duchess performed patrols off Port Said and was rotated through the plane guard stations of all three carriers. On 9 November, Duchess departed for Malta. She returned to Port Said on 17 November, and was again attached to the carrier force as an escort and plane guard. From 27 November to 16 December, the destroyer was sent to Cyprus for more anti-smuggler patrols, but the ship was recalled to cover the final withdrawal of British forces from Port Said. She remained in or near Port Said Harbour until 22 December: although due to sail that morning with the last troop convoy, Duchess remained on station until 20:00 in the unsuccessful hope that a junior officer of the West Yorkshire Regiment kidnapped early in the crisis would be returned. Consequently, Duchess was the last Royal Navy vessel to leave Port Said at the end of the Suez Crisis.

==== 1957–1964 ====
After spending Christmas at Grand Harbour, Duchess sailed from Malta on 1 January 1957 with sister ships Decoy and Diamond, bound for Portsmouth. After a three-month maintenance docking, Duchess was assigned to the Home Fleet. On 17 May, Duchess and Diamond sailed to meet the Royal Yacht Britannia at the River Humber. Britannia was conveying Queen Elizabeth II and Prince Philip, Duke of Edinburgh to Denmark for a state visit. The two destroyers accompanied the royal yacht to Copenhagen, then back to the Moray Firth at the visit's conclusion. On 28 May, the destroyers rejoined the Home Fleet for a fleet review. The destroyers were then assigned to escort the carrier Ark Royal, with the three ships departing on 30 May for the International Naval Review at Hampton Roads in the United States. The review occurred on 12 June, after which Duchess sailed to Bermuda, then back to the United Kingdom. On her return, the ship visited Liverpool for the 750th anniversary of King John's Charter founding the city, then proceeded to Portsmouth. On 27 August, Duchess paid off and was recommissioned.

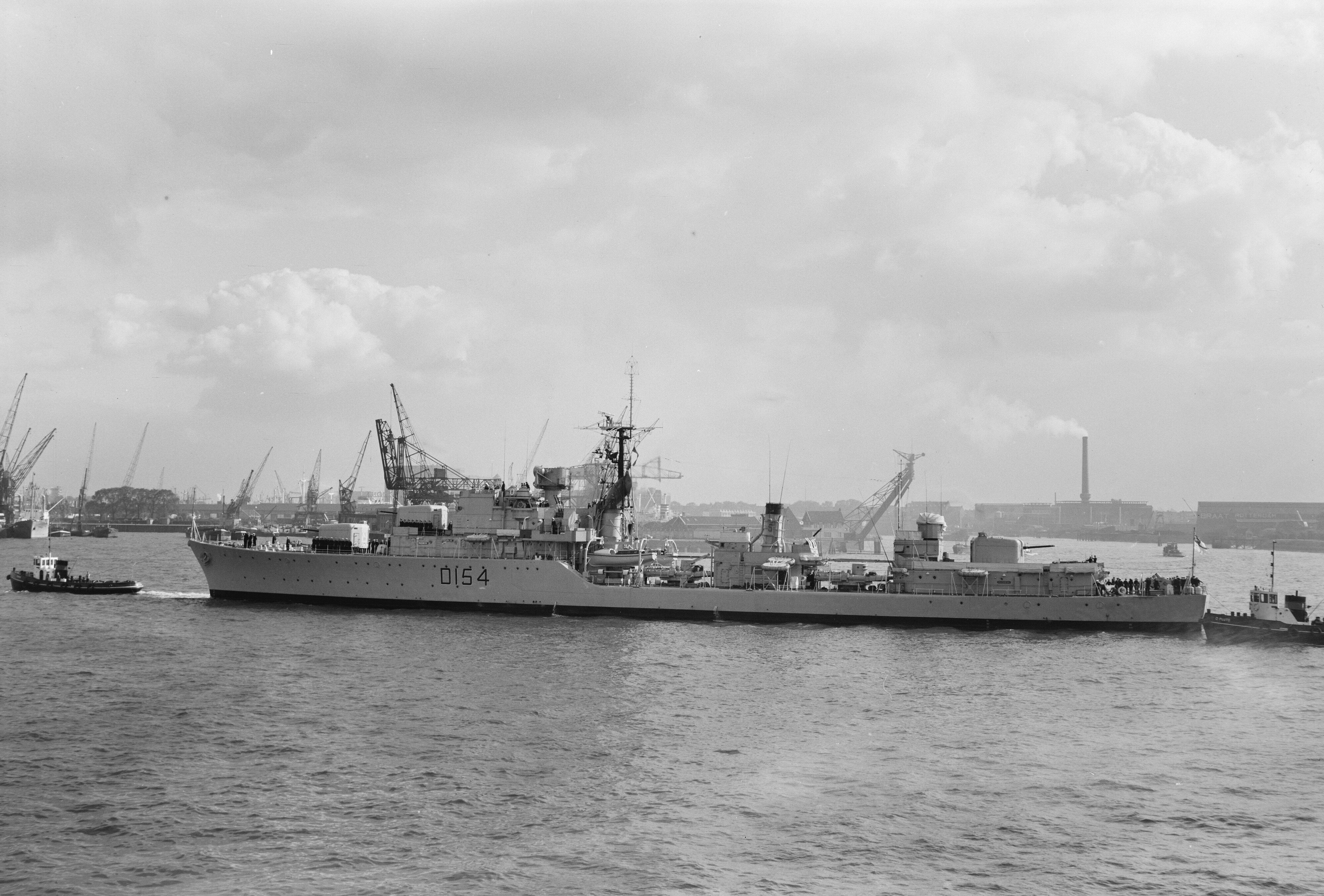
Duchess at the port city of Rotterdam in 1958

On 3 September, Duchess left Portsmouth to join the Mediterranean Fleet as leader of the 5th Destroyer Squadron. Workups were conducted at Silema Creek during September, followed by port visits to Tripoli and Civitavecchia in October, then self-maintenance and day sails from Malta for the rest of the year. 1958 commenced with a seven-week Cyprus patrol. By the end of the patrol on 21 February, the destroyer had developed a leak in her hull, but was able to reach Malta without difficulty. March consisted of participation in Exercise Marjex, followed by port visits to Taranto and Ancona, joint exercises with the Italian Navy, and a visit to Venice before returning to Malta. Major fleet exercises occurred in April and early May. Duchess was due to return to the United Kingdom in May, but unrest in Lebanon (which would escalate into the 1958 Lebanon crisis) required the destroyer to join a response force off Cyprus, which she remained with until 4 July. The destroyer sailed to Malta, then Portsmouth, and was docked for maintenance after arriving on 11 July. Work concluded in September, and Duchess spent the next three months undertaking exercises and port visits in British, Dutch, and French waters. The destroyer reached Spithead on 9 December, and was paid off into reserve later that day. The destroyer was taken into Portsmouth Dockyard hands for a two-year refit. Modifications during this period included the deletion of the aft torpedo launcher and its replacement with a deckhouse for additional accommodation, introduction of centralised messing arrangements, and fitting of air-conditioning to the operations room and sickbay. Intentions at the time were to install a Sea Cat missile launcher on the roof of the new deckhouse during a later refit, but in 1964, the decision was made to fit the launcher to new-build ships only.

Duchess was recommissioned on 3 January 1961, with post-refit workups and maintenance dominating the ship's activities until early April. From April until July, she was involved in a program of anti-submarine warfare training and general exercises, interspersed with short maintenance periods. On 24 July, Duchess sailed from Portsmouth, bound for Malta and the Mediterranean Fleet. On 7 August, while en route, a port visit to Ajaccio was almost cancelled when a possible mutiny aboard a British merchant ship was reported: the destroyer was to sail to assist, but was not required. Duchess reached Grand Harbour on 18 August, and was drydocked for maintenance. Returning to service in September, the rest of Duchess' year was dominated by exercises and flag-showing port visits. Exercises and port visits resumed in January 1962, and continued until 26 March, when the destroyer left Malta heading for Portsmouth. In addition to the schedule of Home Fleet exercises, Duchess made official visits to Stockholm and Helsinki with Bermuda in May, underwent refit from July to October, as in November was part of the search for the helicopter that crashed off St David's Head carrying Lord Windlesham. On 17 December, the ship's fifth commission was paid off.

Duchess was recommissioned on 2 January 1963. Originally intended to be deployed with the Mediterranean Fleet, the December 1962 Brunei Revolt and tensions in South East Asia that would shortly escalate into the Indonesia–Malaysia confrontation prompted a strengthening of British assets in the region, including the assignment of Duchess to the Far East Fleet. The destroyer left Portsmouth on 8 April bound for Singapore, with visits en route to Gibraltar, Malta, Port Said, and Aden. Arriving on 12 June, the ship spent the next few weeks on day exercises, before being docked in the King George VI Graving Dock for three weeks of maintenance. Tactical exercises took up late July and early August, after which, Duchess was deployed to patrol off North Borneo and Sarawak. A visit to Hong Kong occurred in early September, followed by guardship duties off Sandakan. Further patrols of North Borneo occurred in October, and on 7 November, the destroyer was called to assist the British merchantman Woodburn, which had run aground off Singapore's Horsburgh Lighthouse. Exercises continued until 23 December, when Duchess arrived at Singapore for maintenance and leave. She resumed operations on 10 February 1964, transporting a contingent of Gurkhas to the Sarawak River, then visited Hong Kong.

=== Transfer ===
Following the loss of the Australian-built Daring-class destroyer Voyager in a collision with the aircraft carrier Melbourne on 10 February 1964, both the United Kingdom and the United States offered to loan ships to the Royal Australian Navy (RAN) as a temporary replacement; the Royal Navy offering Duchess or Defender while the United States Navy offered two Fletcher-class destroyers: US Ships The Sullivans and Twining. The Admiralty suggested Defender because she had just completed a major modernisation, and Duchess because her location in South East Asia meant she could be handed over quickly. Duchess was seen as the more favourable vessel for the British offer: in addition to the proximity, the ship was due to undergo refit in June, and doing so while in Australian hands meant the Royal Australian Navy (RAN) could make any modifications they felt necessary. Unlike Duchess, Defender's internal electrics were configured for DC power, and the ship lacked air-conditioning.

The loan of Duchess to the RAN was offered on 18 February, and accepted on 25 February by the Australian government. The loan period was for four years, with no cost for the ship itself, although the RAN would be financially responsible for running costs and modifications. During the loan period, the RAN intended to construct two modified River-class frigates (Swan and Torrens) as permanent replacements. Duchess concluded her exercise program on 9 March, and returned to Singapore for maintenance. She left Singapore for Australia on 6 April, visiting Darwin and Townsville before reaching Sydney on 19 April. The ship was handed over to the RAN that day.

The destroyer was then sailed to Williamstown Naval Dockyard for modification. On 8 May, the handover was completed, and the ship was commissioned into the RAN as HMAS Duchess. Refits were completed in November, and the destroyer spent the rest of the year undertaking trials and working up exercises.

=== Royal Australian Navy ===
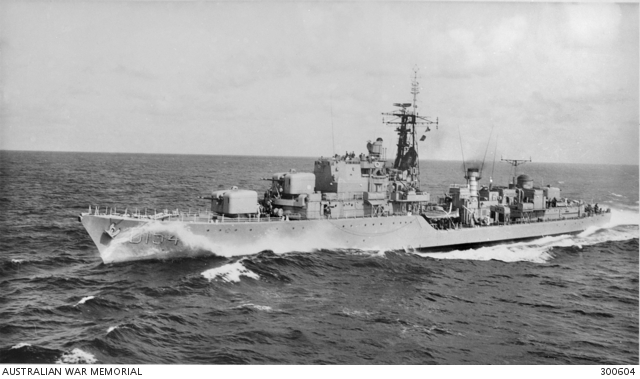
HMAS Duchess in the 1960s

From January to March 1965, Duchess was deployed to the Far East, and undertook numerous patrols of the Malaysian and Borneo coasts. In late May, Duchess was assigned to the escort screen for the troopship Sydney as she made her first of twenty-five Vietnam War troop transport runs to Vũng Tàu. Duchess escorted the former carrier for the entire voyage, with the two ships returning to Sydney on 5 July. After a maintenance period, Duchess was deployed to the Far East Strategic Reserve (FESR) on 11 August. After a short period of patrols, the destroyer and Vendetta were detached to meet Sydney off Manus Island on 20 December, and joined the troopship on her second voyage to Vietnam. The three ships reached Vũng Tàu on 28 September, and departed two days later: after clearing the Market Time area, the two destroyers broke off and headed for Hong Kong. A brief period of maintenance concluded on 26 October, and Duchess resumed patrols until the end of the year. 1966 commenced with more Borneo patrols and a stint at guardship at Tawau. The destroyer returned to Darwin on 2 March, then sailed to Sydney for a seven-month refit. The rest of the year was spent exercising in eastern Australian waters.

In January 1967, the destroyer was again deployed to the FESR. As the Confrontation had concluded, the deployment was characterised by fewer patrols and more exercises and port visits. During the six-month assignment, Duchess called into Telok Kekek, Pulau Langkawi, Pulau Song Song, Bangkok, Hong Kong, and Singapore. She returned to Sydney on 17 June and docked for refits. On 12 October, the four-year loan of the ship was extended to April 1972. The refit concluded on 3 June 1968, and the destroyer was assigned to multinational exercises; first with the Royal New Zealand Navy off Auckland, then with British, New Zealand, and American units in the Solomon Sea. Duchess was then deployed to the FESR, and arrived in Singapore on 10 October. A program of port visits was interrupted in November by the need to escort Sydney on her twelfth Vietnam voyage. On 18 November, Duchess met Sydney off Singapore, and accompanied the troopship to and from the warzone, before sailing to Hong Kong. Official visits to ports in South Korea and Japan followed, with Duchess back in Hong Kong for the Christmas-New Year break. January and February 1969 saw the destroyer travel as far west as Pakistan. The destroyer returned to Singapore on 25 March, via Thailand and Hong Kong, then after a short exercise period, the destroyer headed for Sydney. Maintenance and local exercises dominated the ship's schedule until November, when she headed north to escort Sydney on the latter's fifteenth voyage. After reaching Vũng Tàu on 28 November, then escorting the troopship from the warzone, Duchess peeled off to commence another FESR deployment. After a short maintenance period in Singapore, the destroyer visited Subic Bay, then headed to Hong Kong for the end of the year.

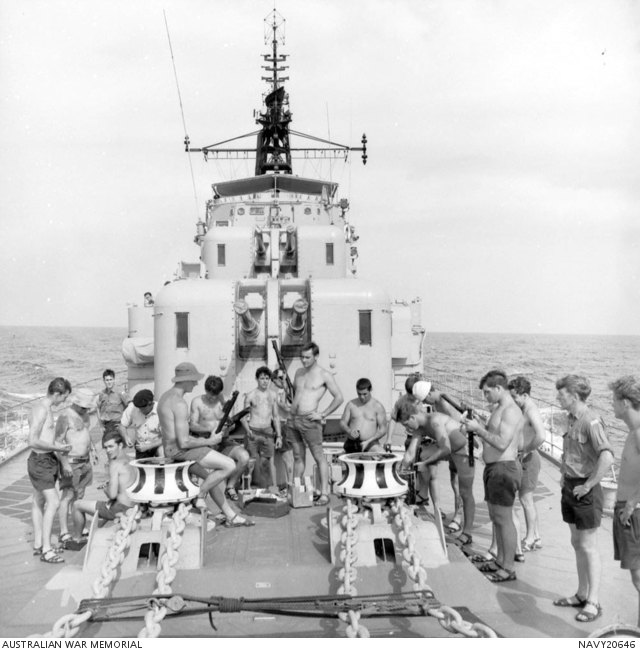
Duchess crewmen practice with F1 submachine guns, November 1969

After participating in a week of fleet exercises in mid-January 1970, Duchess began a sequence of port visits: Port Swettenham, Kota Kinabalu, Manila, Bangkok, Hong Kong, Osaka (coinciding with Expo '70), Kobe, and Subic Bay before returning to Singapore. This was followed by SEATO exercises in the South China Sea during March and April. Duchess returned to Sydney on 5 June, and was docked for a refit, which lasted until 8 February 1971. On 18 March, Duchess was again deployed to the Far East. The destroyer met Sydney off Singapore on the troopship's nineteenth on 3 April. The two ships arrived in Vũng Tàu on 5 April, and returned to Hong Kong on 8 April. After a sequence of port visits, Duchess and Parramatta met Sydney on 17 May for transportation run twenty. Vũng Tàu was reached on 22 May, with departure a day later. Duchess sailed to Hong Kong, then on 8 June departed for Australia, arriving on 25 May and commencing a mid-cycle docking which ran until 13 November. In January 1972, Duchess joined Melbourne, Stalwart, and Supply for a task group deployment to Asian waters. The deployment included SEATO exercises and port visits to Port Klang and Surabaya, before the ships arrived in Fremantle on 14 April. After proceeding to Sydney for maintenance, Duchess resumed exercising in local waters. During a surface firing exercise on 25 July, a shell from B turret hit one of the elevated barrels of A turret. In August, with her loan period up, Duchess was purchased outright from the Royal Navy for £150,000. After a midshipman training cruise to Port Moresby in August, the ship spent the rest of the year on exercises and training.

On 5 January 1973, Duchess arrived at Williamstown Naval Dockyard for conversion into a training ship. The aft funnel was streamlined, and the remaining torpedo launcher, aft gun turret, and Squid mortar were all removed. This allowed for the installation of an extended aft superstructure, with classrooms, instructor offices, and additional accommodation for the embarked trainees. The former turret's loading bay was converted into library and study areas. A semi-enclosed charthouse was fitted above and behind the bridge for navigation training. The refit concluded on 14 August 1974, with Duchess replacing Anzac as the RAN's dedicated training vessel. From January 1975 to July 1976, Duchess operated on a sequence of training cruises, visiting ports along the eastern Australian coast, as well as New Zealand and the South Pacific. She was docked from July to October at Cockatoo Island Dockyard to combat hull corrosion, then resumed her training schedule. Her final training cruise ran during August and September 1977, after which, Duchess was replaced by Jervis Bay.

== Decommissioning and fate ==
Handover of training duties to Jervis Bay was done on 23 September 1977. On 23 October, Duchess was decommissioned. The ship was sold to Tung Ho Steel for breaking up as scrap on 7 May 1980, and departed Sydney under tow for Taiwan on 9 July.

Following a 2010 reorganisation of RAN battle honours, the destroyer's involvement in the Indonesia-Malaysia Confrontation while in RAN service was recognised with the battle honour "Malaysia 1965–66".
