= BAP Palacios (DM-73) =

Peruvian destroyer

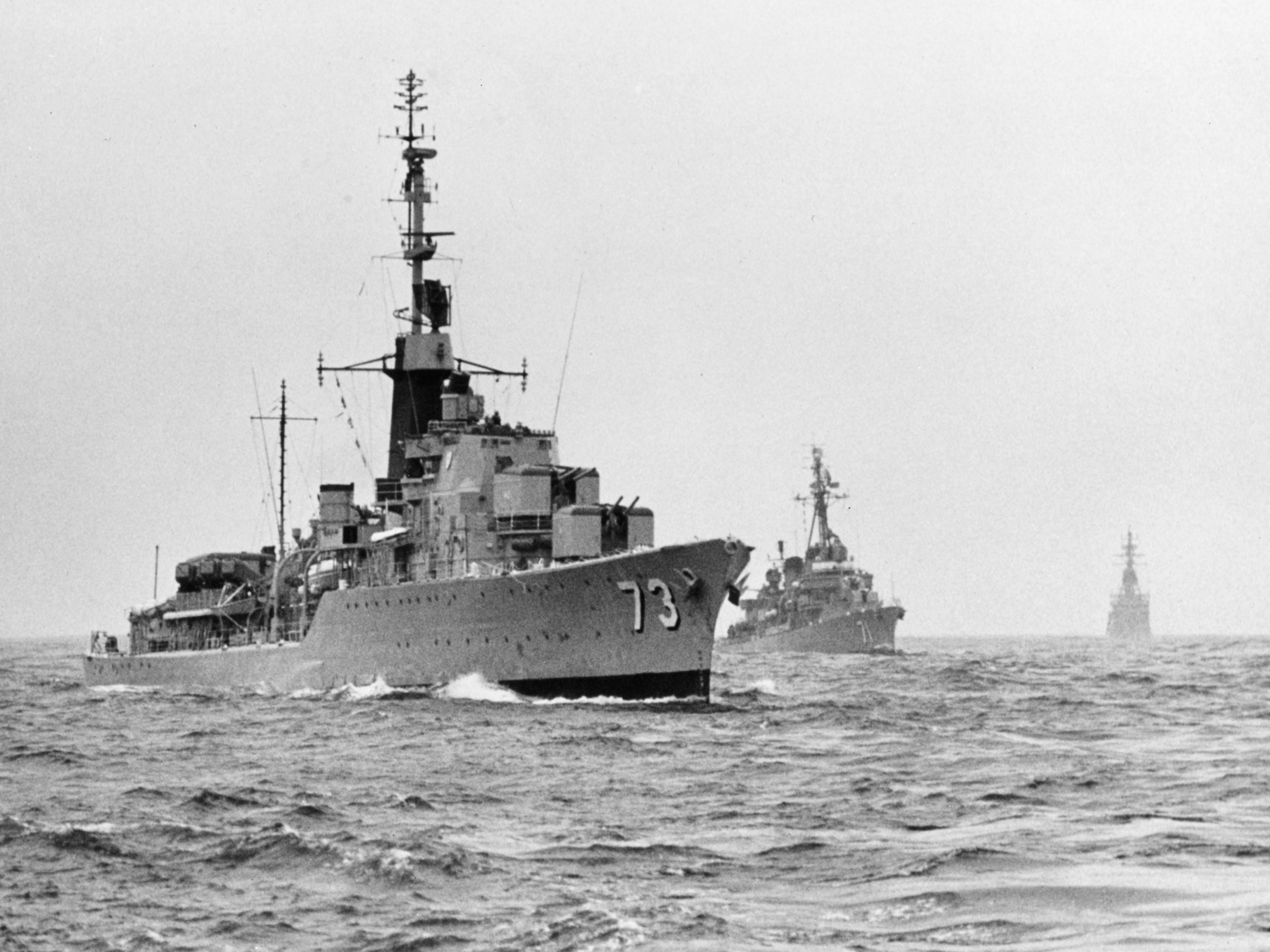
- BAP Palacios (DM-73)

History

United Kingdom
- Name: HMS Diana
- Builder: Yarrow and Co. Ltd, Glasgow
- Laid down: April 3, 1947
- Launched: May 8, 1952
- Commissioned: March 29, 1954
- Fate: Sold to Peruvian Navy on 1969

Peru
- Name: Palacios
- Commissioned: April 1973
- Decommissioned: 1993
- Home port: Callao

General characteristics
- Class & type: Daring-class destroyer
- Displacement: 2,819 tonnes standard; 3,592 tonnes full load
- Length: 121.60 m (398 ft 11 in)
- Beam: 13.10 m (43 ft 0 in)
- Draught: 5.50 m (18 ft 1 in)
- Draft: 4.60 m (15 ft 1 in)
- Propulsion: 2 Babcock & Wilcox boilers; 2 English Electric geared steam turbines; 2 shafts; 54,800 shp (40,900 kW)
- Speed: 32 knots (59 km/h; 37 mph)
- Range: 3,500 nmi (6,500 km; 4,000 mi) at 15 knots (28 km/h)
- Complement: 205 (17 officers)
- Sensors & processing systems: 1 Plessey AWS-1 early warning; 1 Thomson-CSF Triton surface search; 1 RTN-10X fire control; 1 Decca 1226 navigation
- Electronic warfare & decoys: F0417-501 intercept
- Armament: 8 Exocet MM-38 SSM; 2 Vickers 114 mm/45 Mk V twin guns; 2 OTO Melara Twin 40L70 DARDO compact gun
- Aircraft carried: 1 AB-212ASW helicopter
- Aviation facilities: Telescopic hangar for 1 medium helicopter.

BAP Palacios (DM-73) was a Daring-class destroyer in service with the Peruvian Navy. She was completed for the Royal Navy in 1954 as HMS Diana. After being decommissioned she was sold to Peru in 1969 together with her sister ship HMS Decoy. She was renamed after Enrique Palacios, a war hero who fought at the Battle of Angamos during the War of the Pacific.

Prior to entering service with the Peruvian Navy she underwent a major refit by Cammell Laird at Birkenhead between 1970 and 1973. Work done during this refit included the following:

- Rebuilding of the foremast for installation of the Plessey AWS-1 air-search radar
- Installation of eight Exocet MM-38 surface-to-surface missiles in place of the Close Range Blind Fire Director forward of 'X' turret

After her rebuild, Palacios was commissioned into the Peruvian Navy in April 1973. Further work was done on the ship by SIMA dockyards in Callao as follows:

- In 1975–1976 the Squid anti-submarine weapon mortar was removed and a helicopter landing deck fitted.
- In 1977–1978 two OTO Melara twin 40L70 DARDO compact gun mountings were installed as was an AESN NA-10 gun fire-control system and an AESN RTN-10X fire-control radar. The aft 114 mm turret was replaced with a telescopic hangar.

After serving in two navies for 39 years, Palacios was decommissioned in 1993.

== Sources ==
- Baker III, Arthur D., The Naval Institute Guide to Combat Fleets of the World 2002-2003. Annapolis: Naval Institute Press, 2002.
- Colledge, J. J.; Warlow, Ben (2006) [1969]. Ships of the Royal Navy: The Complete Record of All Fighting Ships of the Royal Navy from the 15th Century to the Present (3rd Rev ed.). London: Chatham Publishing. ISBN 978-1-86176-281-8. OCLC 67375475.
- Couhat, Jean. Combat Fleets of the World 1982/83. Annapolis: Naval Institute Press, 1982.
