= John Ronald Gower =

British naval officer (1912–2007)

- Born: 7 April 1912; Nairobi, Kenya
- Died: 18 November 2007 (aged 95); Aldeburgh, Suffolk
- Relatives: David Gower (nephew)
- Military career
- Allegiance: United Kingdom
- Branch: Royal Navy
- Service years: 1926–1962
- Rank: Captain
- Commands: HMS Winchester; HMS Swift; HMS Orwell; HMS Diana
- Conflicts: Second World War: Dunkirk evacuation; Lofoten Islands Raid; Arctic Convoys; Operation Tungsten; Battle of Normandy; Operation Spellbinder; Suez Crisis
- Awards: Distinguished Service Cross; Mentioned in Dispatches (2)

John Ronald Gower (7 April 1912 – 18 November 2007) was a captain in the Royal Navy who fought in the Second World War. He took part in several naval actions including the evacuation from Dunkirk, the attack on the German battleship Tirpitz and the Normandy landings, where his ship covered the troops landing on Sword Beach. In the post-war period he commanded the destroyer HMS Diana when it carried out experiments in waters contaminated by the nuclear fallout of two nuclear explosions in Operation Mosaic, and when it sank the Egyptian frigate Domiat in the Red Sea on 1 November 1956.

== Biography ==
=== Early life and career ===
John Ronald Gower was born on 7 April 1912 in Nairobi, Kenya, where his father was a judge. He had a younger brother, Derek, who was killed in the Normandy landings during the Second World War. His youngest brother, Dicky followed his father into the Colonial Service, and became the father of David Gower, who was captain of the English national cricket team. An ancestor, the eighteenth-century explorer and naval officer Erasmus Gower, was in command the sloop HMS Swift when he was shipwrecked on the coast of Patagonia in 1770; Gower would later command the ship's namesake.

Gower joined the Royal Navy in 1926, entering as a cadet in the Royal Naval College, Dartmouth. Between 1929 and 1932, he served as a midshipman on the heavy cruiser HMS Shropshire with the 1st Cruiser Squadron of the Mediterranean Fleet, and then on destroyer HMS Boadicea. He completed the sub lieutenant's course, and was promoted to the rank effect 1 May 1933. After service on the battleship HMS Barham, he was promoted to lieutenant on 1 September 1935. He then served on the flagship of the Mediterranean Fleet, the battleship HMS Queen Elizabeth. In 1937, he became a divisional officer at HMS St Vincent, the boys' training establishment at Gosport, where he was serving when the Second World War broke out in Europe in September 1939.

=== Second World War ===
In June 1940 Gower took part in the Dunkirk evacuation as part of the crew of the minesweeper HMS Albury. He was then posted to HMS Mytilus, a tanker outfitted as a fire ship for use against ports in occupied Europe with the aim of destroying invasion barges as part of Operation Lucid. He next joined the crew of the destroyer HMS Bedouin, and participated in the Lofoten Islands Raid in February 1941, and the first of the Arctic Convoys. In April 1942 he assumed command of the destroyer HMS Winchester. He was promoted to lieutenant commander on 1 September 1943, and assumed command of the destroyer HMS Swift, again participating in Arctic convoy duty.

In February 1944 Gower participated in the rescue of the submarine HMS Stubborn, which had been badly damaged while it was recharging its batteries on the surface off the coast of Norway, and after identifying the submarine he managed to take it in tow back to Britain, despite coming under air attack. In April 1944, he took part in Operation Tungsten, the attack on the German battleship Tirpitz, which lay hidden in the Norwegian fjords. On 6 June 1944, he participated in the Normandy landing, with Swift bombarding targets on Sword Beach. When the Norwegian destroyer HNoMS Svenner was hit by a torpedo on D-Day, despite orders not to abandon the position or to launch lifeboats, he allowed Swift to drift towards the survivors, and was thus able to rescue 80 members of its crew.

On 23 June, returning from a night patrol hunting some E-boats, Swift bumped into an acoustic mine that exploded and sank the ship in shallow water. For his actions during the Normandy campaign, Gower was awarded the Distinguished Service Cross. His next command was the destroyer HMS Orwell, a ship belonging to the 17th Flotilla of Home Fleet. It patrolled the English Channel and escorted convoys in the Arctic. In January 1945 he took part in Operation Spellbinder, the return of the Royal Navy units in the southern waters of Norway. During this operation he was twice mentioned in dispatches.

=== Post-war activity ===
After the end of the Second World War Gower served as a course officer at the Royal Naval College, which was then at Eaton Hall, Cheshire. From 1946 to 1947 as the Home Fleet Recreation Officer on the battleships HMS King George V and HMS Duke of York. In 1948 he married Aimée Joan Winder, who bore him four children, two boys and two girls. She died in 2000. He was deputy commander of the training cruiser HMS Devonshire between 1949 and 1951, and commander of the Royal Naval College, Greenwich between 1951 and 1953. He attended the Joint Services Staff College course in 1953 and 1954, and was the Royal Navy's Director of PT and Sports from 1954 to 1956. He was promoted to captain on 30 June 1953.

After duty as director of the Torpedo Boat training school Portsmouth between 1954 and 1955, he assumed command of the destroyer HMS Diana in 1956. Diana participated in Operation Mosaic, a series of nuclear experiments in the southern hemisphere, including in the Monte Bello Islands in Western Australia. To assess the effects of navigation under a nuclear attack, Diana entered the zone of nuclear fallout of two atmospheric explosions, one of 15 kilotonnes of TNT (63 TJ) and one of 60 kilotonnes of TNT (250 TJ). No special essential protective clothing was issued. Australian authorities denied the Diana permission to dock at Fremantle afterwards, as they considered the ship extremely contaminated. Many members of the crew became ill and he later advocated that they and their families receive compensation and medical care. During the Suez Crisis he was in command of Diana when it sank the Egyptian frigate Domiat in the Red Sea on 1 November 1956. He was the naval attaché at the British embassy in Santiago, Chile from 1958 to 1960, and then commanded the boys' training school HMS Ganges from 1960 until he retired from active service on 28 August 1962.

Gower went to live in Scotland, where he worked for seven years with Sir Billy Butlin before opening a business selling caravans in Belmont, Ayr. He later settled in Aldeburgh, Suffolk, where he died on 18 November 2007.

=== In the media ===
The writer John Winton had been a cadet under Gower and used him as a model for the character of Lieutenant Commander Robert Badger, also known as "The Artful Bodger". Badger was the protagonist of the comedic novel We Joined the Navy and its sequels. A film adaptation of the novel was released in 1963 with Kenneth More starring as Badger.

Between 1929 and 1932, Gower wrote the three volumes of the series Midshipman's Journal.
