= John Hamilton (Royal Navy officer, born 1910) =

Royal Navy Admiral (1910–1994)

Admiral Sir John Hamilton GBE CB
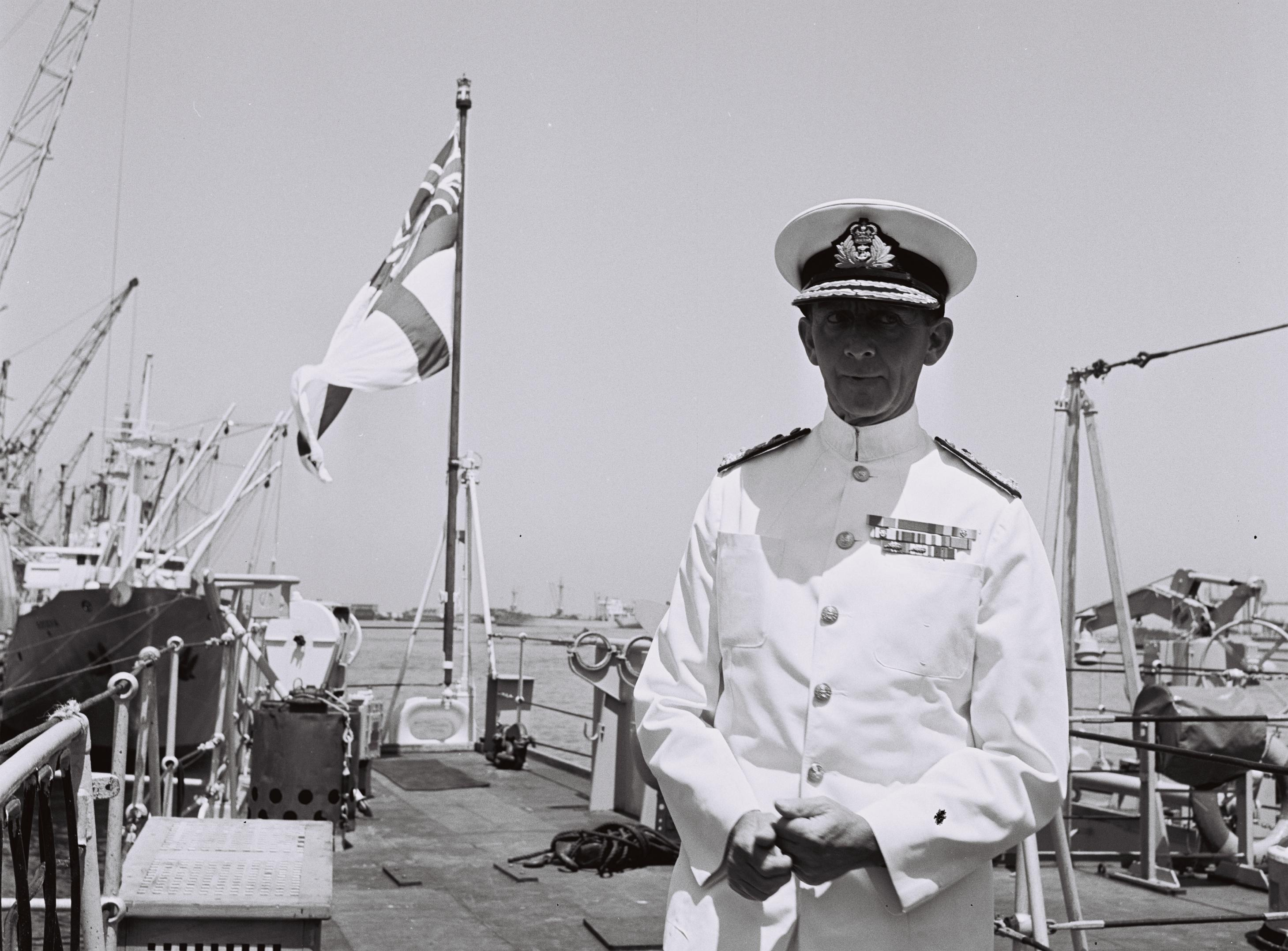
- Admiral John Hamilton in Haifa Port, 1966
- Born: 12 July 1910
- Died: 27 October 1994 (aged 84); Abbotsbury, Dorset
- Military career
- Allegiance: United Kingdom
- Branch: Royal Navy
- Service years: 1924–1967
- Rank: Admiral
- Commands: Allied Forces Mediterranean (1964–67); Mediterranean Fleet (1964–67); Flag Officer, Air (Home) (1962–64); HMS Newfoundland (1956–58); 5th Destroyer Squadron (1952–53); HMS Solebay (1952–53); HMS Alacrity (1946–48)
- Conflicts: Second World War; Suez Crisis
- Awards: Knight Grand Cross of the Order of the British Empire; Companion of the Order of the Bath; Mentioned in Despatches (2)

Admiral Sir John Graham Hamilton, GBE, CB (12 July 1910 – 27 October 1994) was a Royal Navy officer who served as Commander-in-Chief, Mediterranean Fleet from 1964 to 1967.

== Naval career ==
Hamilton joined the Royal Navy in 1924, and specialised in gunnery in 1936.

Hamilton served in the Second World War on the staff of Admiral Sir Andrew Cunningham in the Mediterranean Fleet and was then Gunnery Officer on the battleship HMS Warspite in South East Asia. He also carried out the planning of the Naval Fire Support for the Normandy landings.

After the war, Hamilton commanded HMS Alacrity, and was promoted to captain on 30 Jun 1949, before becoming deputy director of Radio Equipment in 1950. He went on to be commander of the 5th Destroyer Squadron in 1952 and Director of Naval Ordnance at the Admiralty in 1954. He was given command of the cruiser HMS Newfoundland in 1956 and became Naval Secretary in 1958. Then he became Flag Officer (Flotillas) for the Home Fleet in 1960 and Flag Officer, Air (Home) in 1962. His last appointment was as Commander-in-Chief, Mediterranean Fleet and NATO Commander Allied Forces Mediterranean in 1964. He retired in 1967.

Military offices
Preceded by Alastair Ewing	Naval Secretary; 1958–1960	Succeeded by Frank Twiss
Preceded by Sir Deric Holland-Martin	Commander-in-Chief, Mediterranean Fleet; 1964–1967	Position abolished
