= BAP Ferré (DM-74) =

Peruvian Navy destroyer

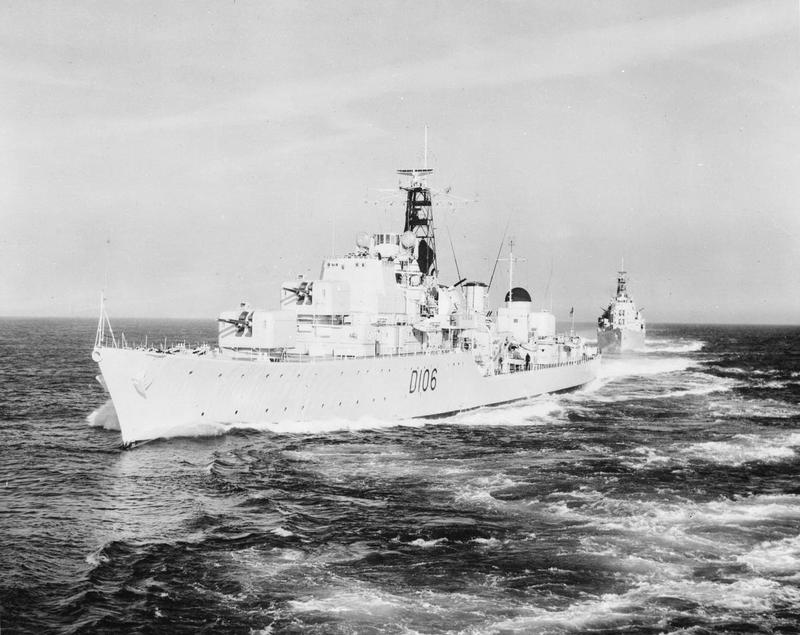
- HMS Decoy underway, c1953 (IWM)

History

United Kingdom
- Name: Decoy
- Builder: Yarrow and Co. Ltd, Glasgow
- Laid down: 22 September 1946
- Launched: 29 March 1949
- Commissioned: 28 April 1953
- Identification: D106
- Fate: Sold to Peruvian Navy in 1969

Peru
- Name: Ferré
- Acquired: 1969
- Commissioned: April, 1973
- Decommissioned: 13 July 2007
- Home port: Callao
- Identification: DM-74
- Fate: Presumed scrapped

General characteristics
- Class & type: Daring-class destroyer
- Displacement: 2,819 tonnes standard; 3,592 tonnes full load
- Length: 121.6 m (399 ft)
- Beam: 13.1 m (43 ft)
- Draught: 5.5 m (18 ft)
- Draft: 4.6 m (15 ft)
- Propulsion: 2 Babcock & Wilcox boilers; 2 English Electric geared steam turbines; 2 shafts; 54,800 shp (40,900 kW)
- Speed: 32 knots (59 km/h)
- Range: 3,500 nautical miles (6,500 km) at 15 knots (28 km/h)
- Complement: 186 (18 officers)
- Sensors & processing systems: 1 × Plessey AWS-1 early warning; 1 × Thomson-CSF Triton surface search; 1 × RTN-10X fire control; 1 × Decca 1226 navigation
- Electronic warfare & decoys: F0417-501 intercept
- Armament: 8 × Exocet MM-38 SSM; 3 × Vickers 114 mm/45 Mk V twin guns; 2 × OTO Melara Twin 40L70 DARDO compact guns (installed 1978); 1 × Squid mortar (removed 1976)
- Aviation facilities: Landing deck for 1 medium helicopter

BAP Ferré (DM-74) was a Daring-class destroyer in service with the Peruvian Navy from 1973 to 2007. She was built by Yarrow Shipbuilders and completed for the Royal Navy in 1953 as HMS Decoy (D106).

== Construction ==
Decoy was one of six Daring-class destroyers ordered on 16 February 1945, which followed on from 10 ships ordered earlier. Eight of the 16 Darings were cancelled in December 1945, before they were laid down, but construction of the remaining eight ships continued, while three more were built by Australia.

Decoy (Note: Originally to be called Dragon.) was laid down at Yarrow & Company's Scotstoun shipyard on 22 September 1946, was launched on 29 March 1949 and completed on 28 April 1953.

== Design ==
Decoy was 390 feet 0 inches (118.87 m) long overall, 375 feet 0 inches (114.30 m) at the waterline and 366 feet 0 inches (111.56 m) between perpendiculars. She had a beam of 43 feet 0 inches (13.11 m) and a draught of 13 feet 0 inches (3.96 m) deep load. Displacement was 2,610 long tons (2,650 t) standard and 3,350 long tons (3,400 t) deep load. The ship was of part-welded construction (some of the Darings were fully welded, but Yarrow did not have facilities to build fully welded ships), and Aluminium was used for internal bulkheads, in one of the first uses of this material in Royal Navy ships. Two Babcock & Wilcox boilers supplied steam at 650 pounds per square inch (4,500,000 Pa) and 850 °F (454 °C) to two seats of English Electric double-reduction geared steam turbines, which in turn drove two propeller shafts. The machinery, which was laid out in the unit arrangement, was rated at 54,000 shaft horsepower (40,000 kW), giving a maximum speed of 34 knots (39 mph; 63 km/h).

The ship was armed with three twin QF 4.5-inch (113 mm) Mark VI dual-purpose gun mounts, with a close-in anti-aircraft armament of three twin Bofors 40 mm mounts, with two stabilised STAAG mounts and one simpler, non-stabilised Mark V (or "Utility") mount. Two quintuple mounts for 21-inch (533 mm) torpedoes were carried, while anti-submarine armament consisted of a Squid anti-submarine mortar with 30 charges. 3/8 inch (9.5 mm) thick splinter armour was provided for the bridge, gun turrets and turret rings, while 1/4 inch (6.4 mm) plating protected cable runs.

== Royal Navy service ==
Within weeks of being first commissioned Decoy took part in the Fleet Review at Spithead to celebrate the Coronation of Queen Elizabeth II in 1953. In September 1954, Diana, along with the other three AC-powered Darings, (Note: Diamond, Diana and Duchess) was deployed to the Mediterranean Fleet. In 1956 she formed part of the Royal Navy's force used during the Suez Operation. On 4 September 1957, she was run aground at Portland Harbour, Dorset, due to failure of her steering gear. Later that month, Decoy returned to the Mediterranean as part of the 5th Destroyer Squadron, remaining there until July 1958.

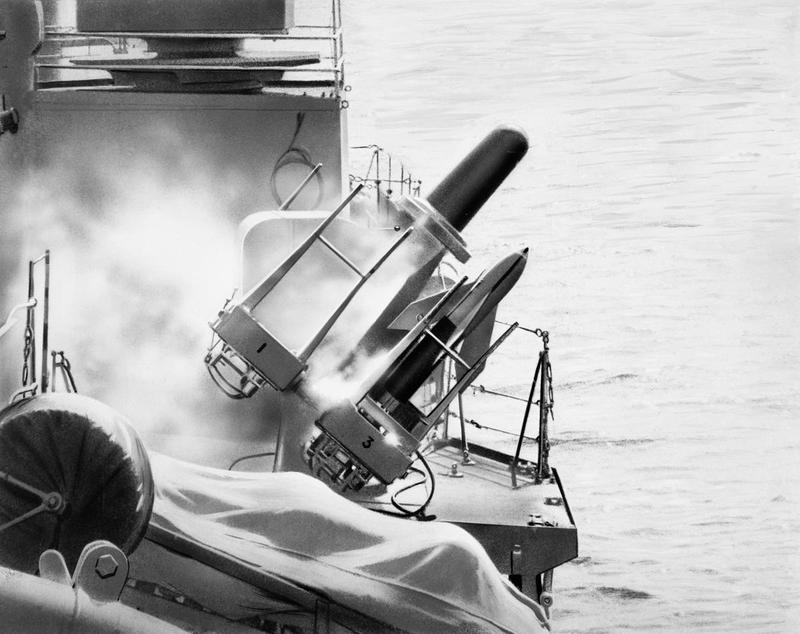
Seacat missile trials on board HMS Decoy, 1961 (IWM A 34404)

From 1960 to 1962 the destroyer undertook trials for the Royal Navy's new Sea Cat missile system, being fitted with a single quadruple launcher on the port rear side, which was removed at the end of the trials.

Following a refit at Devonport Dockyard, Decoy recommissioned on 9 April 1963 and joined the 21st Escort Squadron with Berwick, Dido, Corunna and Cavendish.

By 1966 she was in reserve and completed a long refit in Portsmouth Dockyard and recommissioned again on 15 August 1967 for a general service commission, which included the West Indies and the Far East. Before sailing she attended Portsmouth Navy Days in that year. In 1968 she escorted a Hong Kong-flagged ship to Gibraltar at the ship's Master's request after unrest.

== Commanding officers (Royal Navy) ==
Notable commanding officers include Captain Peter Hill-Norton (1956-1957) and Commander J J Black (1967-1969).

== Peruvian Navy service ==
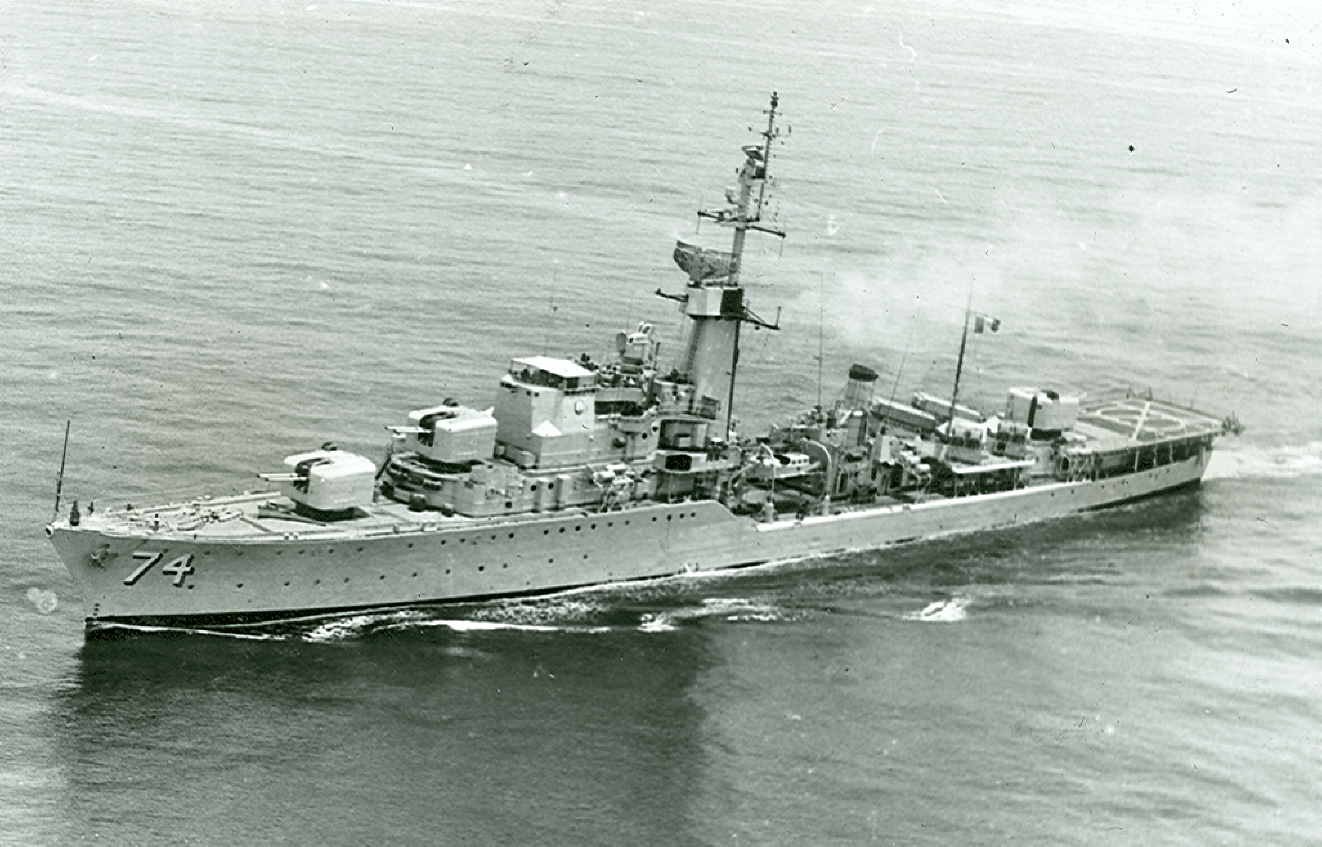
BAP Ferre in 1974

After being decommissioned she was sold to Peru in 1969 together with her sister ship Diana. She was renamed after Diego Ferré, a war hero who died at the Battle of Angamos during the War of the Pacific.

Prior to entering service with the Peruvian Navy she underwent a major refit by Cammell Laird at Birkenhead between 1970 and 1973. Work done during this refit included the following:

- Rebuilding of the foremast for installation of the Plessey AWS-1 air-search radar
- Installation of eight Exocet MM-38 SSMs in place of the Close Range Blind Fire Director forward of X turret

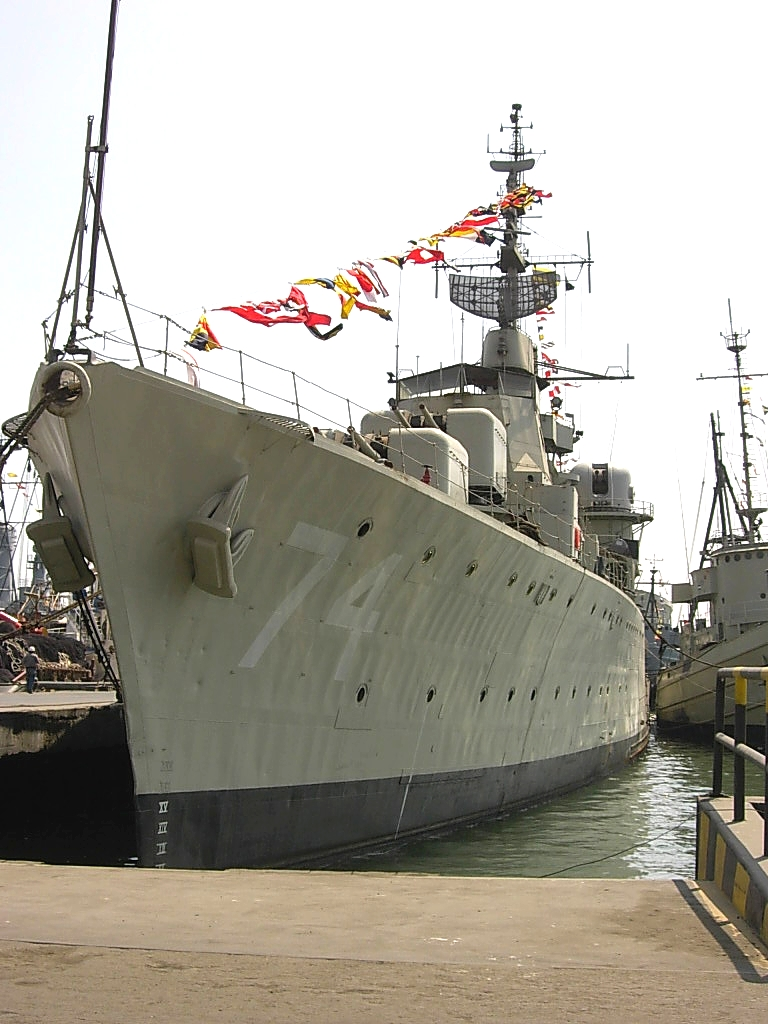
BAP Ferre in Callao Naval base, 2007

After the rebuild was done, Ferré was commissioned into the Peruvian Navy in April 1973. Further work was done on the ship by SIMA dockyards in Callao as follows:

- In 1975–76 the Squid ASW mortar was removed and a helicopter landing deck fitted
- In 1977–1978 two OTO Melara Twin 40L70 DARDO compact gun mountings were installed as was the AESN NA-10 gun fire-control system and an AESN RTN-10X fire-control radar

Ferré tested her Exocet system against BAP Villar (ex-USS Benham) after Villar had been decommissioned from Peruvian service.

After serving in two navies for 54 years, Ferré was decommissioned on 13 July 2007.

== Sources ==
- Baker III, Arthur D. (2002). The Naval Institute Guide to Combat Fleets of the World 2002–2003. Annapolis, Maryland, USA: Naval Institute Press.
- Colledge, J. J.; Warlow, Ben (2006) [1969]. Ships of the Royal Navy: The Complete Record of All Fighting Ships of the Royal Navy from the 15th Century to the Present (3rd Rev ed.). London: Chatham Publishing. ISBN 978-1-86176-281-8. OCLC 67375475.
- Critchley, Mike (1982). British Warships Since 1945: Part 3: Destroyers. Liskeard, UK: Maritime Books. ISBN 0-9506323-9-2.
- English, John (2008). Obdurate to Daring: British Fleet Destroyers 1941–45. Windsor, UK: World Ship Society. ISBN 978-0-9560769-0-8.
- Friedman, Norman (2008). British Destroyers and Frigates: The Second World War and After. Barnsley, UK: Seaforth Publishing. ISBN 978-1-84832-015-4.
- Hodges, Peter (1971). Battle Class Destroyers. London: Almark Publishing. ISBN 0-85524-012-1.
- Lenton, H.T. (1970). Navies of the Second World War: British Fleet & Escort Destroyers Volume Two. London: Macdonald & Co. ISBN 0-356-03122-5.
- Marriott, Leo (1989). Royal Navy Destroyers Since 1945. Shepperton, UK: Ian Allan. ISBN 0-7110-1817-0.
- Sharpe, Richard, ed. (1990). Jane's Fighting Ships 1990–91. Jane's Information Group.
