= Daring-class destroyer (1949) =

1952 class of destroyers of the Royal and Royal Australian navies

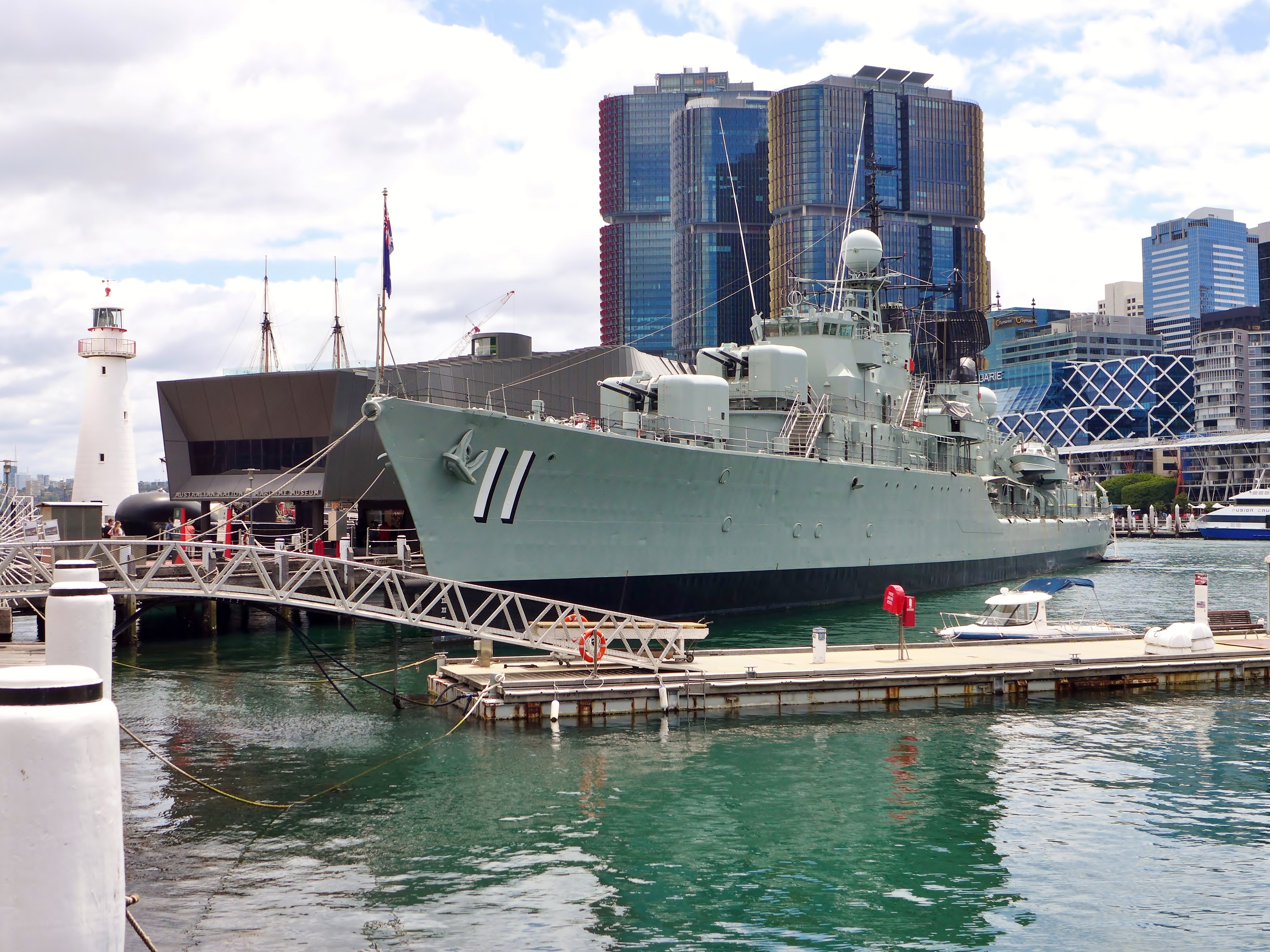
- HMAS Vampire on display at the Australian National Maritime Museum

Class overview
- Name: Daring class
- Operators: Royal Navy; Royal Australian Navy; Peruvian Navy
- Preceded by: Battle class
- Succeeded by: County class (RN); Perth class (RAN)
- Built: 1949–1959
- In commission: 1952–2007
- Planned: 16 (RN); 4 (RAN)
- Completed: 8 (RN); 3 (RAN)
- Cancelled: 8 (RN); 1 (RAN)
- Lost: 1, Voyager
- Preserved: 1, Vampire

General characteristics For RN vessels
- Type: Destroyer
- Displacement: Standard: 2,830 tons, Full load: 3,820 tons
- Length: 390 ft (120 m)
- Beam: 43 ft (13 m)
- Draught: 12.75 ft (3.89 m)
- Propulsion: 2 Foster Wheeler boilers 650 psi (4.5 MPa), 850 °F (454 °C), Parsons steam turbines (English Electric in RAN ships), 2 shafts, 54,000 shp (40 MW)
- Speed: 30 knots (56 km/h; 35 mph)
- Range: 4,400 nautical miles (8,100 km; 5,100 mi) at 20 knots (37 km/h; 23 mph)
- Complement: 297
- Sensors & processing systems: Radar Type 293Q target indication; Radar Type 291 air warning; Radar Type 274 navigation; Radar Type 275 fire control on director Mk.VI; Radar Type 262 fire control on director CRBF and STAAG Mk.II; Radar Type 903 fire control on system MRS-3
- Armament: 6 × QF 4.5 inch /45 (113 mm) Mark V guns in 3 twin mountings UD Mark VI; 4 × 40 mm /60 Bofors A/A in 2 twin mounts STAAG Mk.II; 2 × 40 mm /60 Bofors A/A in 1 twin mount Mk.V; 2 × pentad tubes for 21 inch (533 mm) torpedoes Mk.IX; 1 × Squid A/S mortar

The Daring class was a class of eleven destroyers built for the Royal Navy (RN) and Royal Australian Navy (RAN). Constructed after World War II, and entering service during the 1950s, eight ships were constructed for the RN, and three ships for the RAN. Two of the RN destroyers were subsequently sold to and served in the Peruvian Navy (MGP). A further eight ships were planned for the RN but were cancelled before construction commenced, while a fourth RAN vessel was begun but was cancelled before launch and broken up on the slipway.

The Daring-class ships were both the largest and most heavily armed ships serving in Commonwealth navies to be classified as destroyers. They were intended to fill some of the duties of cruisers, which post WW2 were considered both expensive and obsolete by naval planners, and were briefly officially considered a hybrid type (Darings) before being rated as destroyers. They were also the last destroyers of the RN and RAN to possess guns instead of guided missiles as their main armament. They saw use during the Indonesian Confrontation and the Vietnam War.

The Daring-class destroyers were in service in the RN and RAN from the 1950s to the 1980s. Following decommissioning, two RN Darings were sold to Peru, which operated one ship until 1993 and the other until 2007. One ship of the class is preserved: HMAS Vampire as a museum ship at the Australian National Maritime Museum.

== Design ==
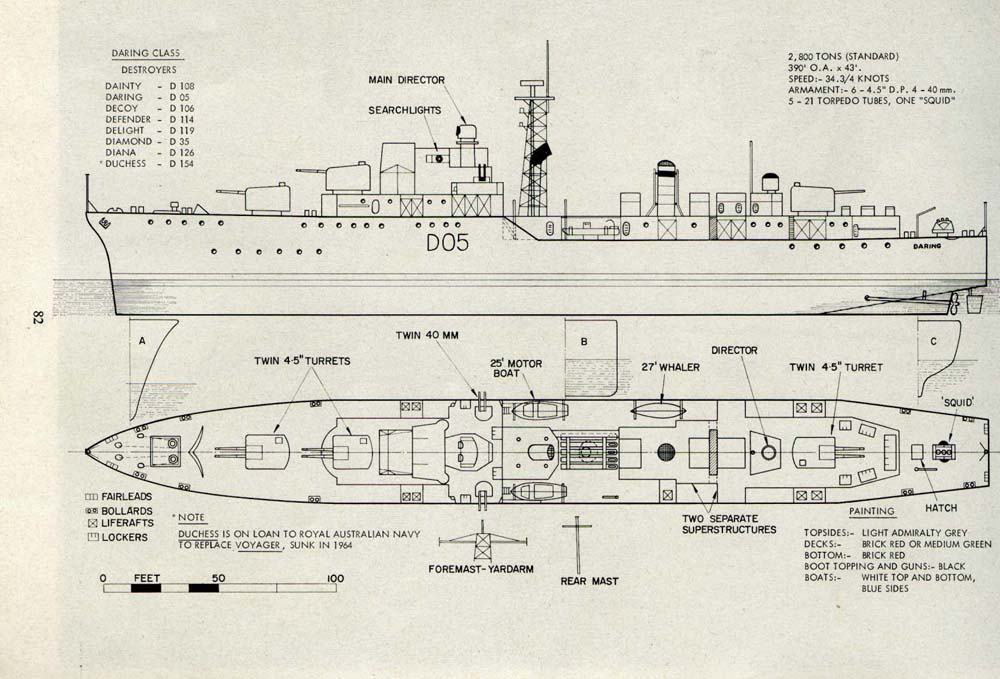
A line drawing of the Daring-class destroyer

The 'Darings' were the largest destroyers then built (1949) for the RN, having a displacement of 3,820 tons, a length of 390 feet (120 m), a beam of 43 feet (13 m), and a draught of 12.75 feet (3.89 m).

The Darings were the last conventional gun destroyers of the RN, and were armed with the QF 4.5 inch /45 (113 mm) Mark V gun in three double mounts UD Mk.VI (later renamed simply Mark N6). The main armament was controlled by a director Mark VI fitted with Radar Type 275 on the bridge and a director CRBF (close range blind fire) aft with Radar Type 262 providing local control for 'X' turret on aft arcs. Remote Power Control (RPC) was provided for the main armament. Darings were capable of a rate of fire of 16 rounds per minute per gun, or about 100 rounds per minute overall.

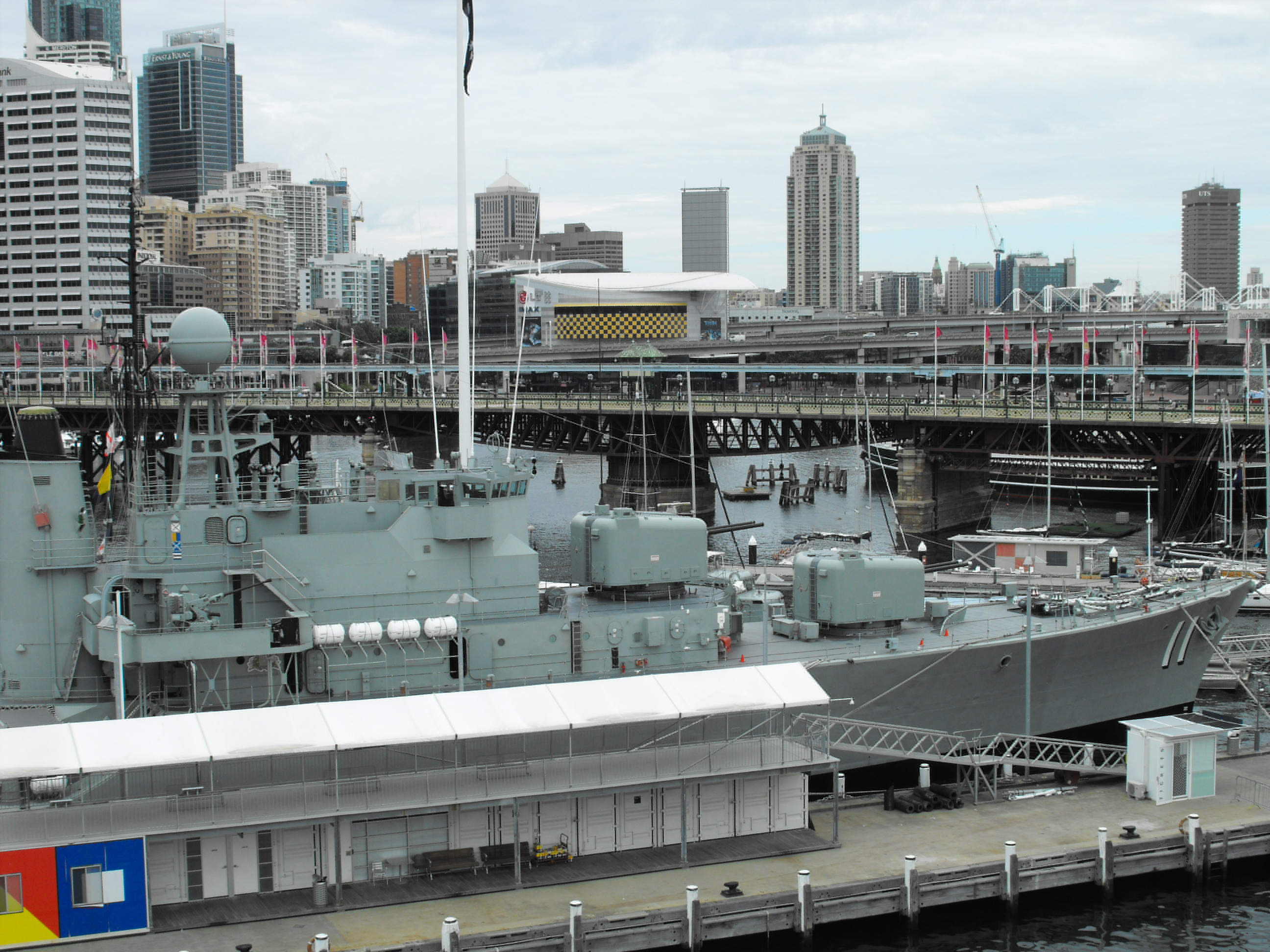
Forward half of Vampire, showing the two forward turrets for the 4.5-inch Mark V guns, and a single 40 mm Bofors

They were designed to ship three twin 40 mm /60 Bofors mounts STAAG Mark II, but the midships one was later replaced by the lighter and more reliable twin Mount Mark V. This meant that the 'Darings' could engage two targets at long range and two at close range under fully automatic radar directed-control, an enormous improvement over their predecessors. Two of the Australian Darings were instead fitted with two twin and two single Bofors mounts. Type 293 was carried on the foremast for target indication.

Like the earlier Weapon class, the Darings had their machinery arranged on the 'unit' principle, where boiler rooms and engine rooms alternated to increase survivability. The boilers utilised pressures and temperatures (650 psi (45 bar), 850 °F (454 °C)) hitherto unheard of in the conservative Royal Navy, allowing great improvements in efficiency to be made without increasing weight. The wide spacing of the boilers resulted in widely spaced funnels. The forward funnel was trunked up through the lattice foremast (referred to as a mack) with the after funnel a stump amidships. Neither was provided with a casing, resulting in a curious, rather unappealing appearance, although the utility of the funnels was considered by some to enhance the overall appearance. Attempts were made to improve the appearance by adding a streamline case to the funnel, but this was later removed. Of note was a new design of bridge, breaking with a lineage going back to the H-class destroyer of 1936. ^{3}/_{8}-inch armour plating was added to the turrets, the bridge and the fire control cable runs.

== Construction ==
=== British ===
The Royal Navy ships were built in two groups, one with the traditional DC electrical system (Daring, Dainty, Defender and Delight) and the remaining ships (Decoy, Diamond, Diana and Duchess), with a modern AC system. They were known as the 2nd and 5th Destroyer Squadrons, respectively.

Two of the ships, Danae and Delight, were originally part of the Battle class, though only Delight (originallyYpres, then Disdain, before finally being renamed Delight) was commissioned.

They were to have been of all-welded construction, but Daring, Decoy, and Diana were built with a composite of welding and riveting.

=== Australian ===
The Royal Australian Navy initially ordered four Daring-class destroyers, which were to be named after the ships of the "Scrap Iron Flotilla" of World War II. The ships were modified during construction: most changes were made to improve habitability, including the installation of air-conditioning. The Darings were also the first all-welded ships to be constructed in Australia.

The first Australian Daring was laid down in 1949. By 1950, it was already apparent that the Australian Darings would not be completed on time, as the Australian dockyards were experiencing difficulty in keeping up with the construction schedule. To compensate for this, the RAN unsuccessfully attempted to purchase two of the 'Darings' under construction in the United Kingdom, and considered acquiring ships from the United States Navy despite the logistical difficulties in supplying and maintaining American vessels in a predominantly British-designed fleet. Only three ships were completed; Voyager, Vendetta, and Vampire were commissioned between 1957 and 1959. By the time they were commissioned, the cost of each ship had increased from A£2.6 million to A£7 million.

=== Cancelled ships ===
Eight further Daring-class destroyers ordered for the Royal Navy were cancelled on 27 December 1945: Danae, Decoy, Delight, Demon, Dervish, Desire, Desperate and Diana. Consequently, the ships of this class originally ordered as Disdain, Dogstar, Dragon and Druid were renamed as Delight, Defender, Decoy and Diana to perpetuate the names of the original D-class flotilla of the 1930s.

The fourth Australian Daring, to be named Waterhen, was laid down in 1952 but cancelled in 1954 and scrapped on the slipway. This was one of several cost-cutting measures to maintain a naval aviation force based around two aircraft carriers.

=== Construction programme ===
Pennant	Name	(a) Hull builder	Ordered	Laid down	Launched	Completed or accepted into service	Commissioned	Estimated building cost
Royal Navy
I05, later D119	Delight (ex-Disdain, ex-Ypres)	Fairfield Shipbuilding and Engineering Company	5 June 1943	5 September 1946	21 December 1950	9 October 1953	9 October 1953	
I06	Danae (ex-Vimiera)	Cammell Laird	5 June 1943	–	–	Cancelled 13 December 1945	–	–
I15, later D05	Daring	Swan, Hunter & Wigham Richardson	24 January 1945	29 September 1945	10 August 1949	8 March 1952	8 March 1952	
I35	Demon	Swan, Hunter & Wigham Richardson	24 January 1945	–	–	Cancelled 13 December 1945	–	–
I52, later D108	Dainty	J. Samuel White, Cowes	24 January 1945	17 December 1945	16 August 1950	26 February 1953	26 February 1953	
I73	Dervish	J. Samuel White, Cowes	24 January 1945	–	–	Cancelled 13 December 1945	–	
I40	Decoy	Vickers-Armstrongs	24 January 1945	–	–	Cancelled 13 December 1945	–	
I45	Delight	Vickers-Armstrongs	24 January 1945	–	–	Cancelled 13 December 1945	–	
I81, later D35	Diamond	John Brown and Company	24 January 1945	15 March 1949	14 June 1950	21 February 1952	21 February 1952	
I87	Desperate	John Brown and Company	24 January 1945	–	–	Cancelled 27 December 1945	–	
I19	Desire	R. & W. Hawthorn, Leslie and Company	16 February 1945	–	–	Cancelled 13 December 1945	–	
I77	Diana	R. & W. Hawthorn, Leslie and Company	16 February 1945	–	–	Cancelled 13 December 1945	–	
I47, later D114	Defender (ex-Dogstar)	Alexander Stephen and Sons	16 February 1945	22 March 1949	27 July 1950	5 December 1952	5 December 1952	
I56, later D106	Decoy (ex-Dragon)	Yarrow and Co.	16 February 1945	23 September 1946	29 March 1949	28 April 1953	28 April 1953	
I26, later D126	Diana (ex-Druid)	Yarrow and Co.	16 February 1945	3 April 1947	8 May 1952	29 March 1954	29 March 1954	
I94, later D154	Duchess	John I. Thornycroft and Company, Woolston Yard	29 March 1945	8 July 1948	9 April 1951	23 October 1952	23 October 1952	
Royal Australian Navy
D11	Vampire	Cockatoo Docks & Engineering Company, Cockatoo Island Dockyard		1 July 1952	27 October 1956	23 June 1959	23 June 1959	
D08	Vendetta	Williamstown Dockyard		4 July 1949	3 May 1954	26 November 1958	26 November 1958	
D04	Voyager	Cockatoo Docks & Engineering Company, Cockatoo Island Dockyard		10 October 1949	1 May 1952	12 February 1957	12 February 1957	
–	Waterhen	Williamstown Dock Yard		December 1952	–	Cancelled 1954	–	–

== British modifications ==
In 1958, the 'DC' group had their after torpedo tubes removed and replaced with a deck house providing additional accommodation facilities. This modification was made in the 'AC' ships in 1959–1960. At the same time, the 'ACs' had their STAAG mounts replaced with single-mount Mark 7 Bofors and had the director Mark VI replaced by the new director MRS-3 (medium range system) incorporating the Radar Type 903 for fire control. The Seacat missile launcher was fitted briefly to Decoy for acceptance trials in 1961, but it was later removed and never fitted to the rest of the 'Darings' as had been envisaged.

Between 1962 and 1964, the 'DC' group had their STAAG mounts replaced by the Mark V also, with the final set of torpedo tubes being removed at the same time. This group also had the director MRS-3 replace the Mark VI.

== Service and fate ==
The class saw service with the RN from the early 1950s to the early 1970s, and with the RAN from the late 1950s to the late 1970s, with Vampire in service as a training ship until 1986. Several of the ships were involved in Cold War conflicts. Delight, Duchess, Vampire and Vendetta were involved in the Indonesian Confrontation. Vendetta also operated during the Vietnam War, the only Australian-built warship to fight in the conflict.

Only one ship of the class was lost. On the night of 10 February 1964, HMAS Voyager crossed the bows of the aircraft carrier Melbourne and was rammed and sunk with the loss of 81 RAN personnel and one civilian contractor. Duchess was loaned to the RAN as a replacement for four years while replacements (two modified River-class destroyer escorts) were constructed, and then sold to the RAN.

The British 'Darings' received little modernisation, and were all decommissioned as obsolete and requiring crews that were too large compared with frigates in 1968–1970. Two of these, Diana and Decoy, were sold to the Peruvian Navy and renamed BAP Palacios and BAP Ferré respectively. These two ships were modernised, with Palacios serving until 1993, and Ferré decommissioning in 2007.

The RAN ships were modernised in the early 1970s at a cost of A$20 million, although modifications to Duchess were fewer than to her sister ships. Duchess and Vendetta remained in commission until the late 1970s, and Vampire was retained until 1986 as a training ship. The Australian 'Darings' were replaced with the Perth-class destroyers, an American-built derivative of the Charles F. Adams-class guided missile destroyer. The training role of the 'Darings' was first supplemented, then replaced, by HMAS Jervis Bay. After decommissioning, Vampire became a museum ship at the Australian National Maritime Museum in Sydney, the only ship of the class to be preserved.

An unidentified Daring-class destroyer played the fictional "HMS Sherwood" in the 1957 A. E. Matthews film comedy Carry On Admiral. There are a number of profile shots of the ship in Portsmouth dockyard, as well as detailed views above and below decks, and an interesting sequence showing the accidental firing of a torpedo at the admiral's barge.

== See also ==
- List of destroyer classes of the Royal Navy

Equivalent destroyers of the same era

- T 47 class
- Akizuki class
- Friesland class
- Halland class
- Impetuoso class
- Forrest Sherman class
- Kotlin class
- Hamburg class
