= HMAS Vendetta (D08) =

1958 Daring-class destroyer of the Royal Australian Navy

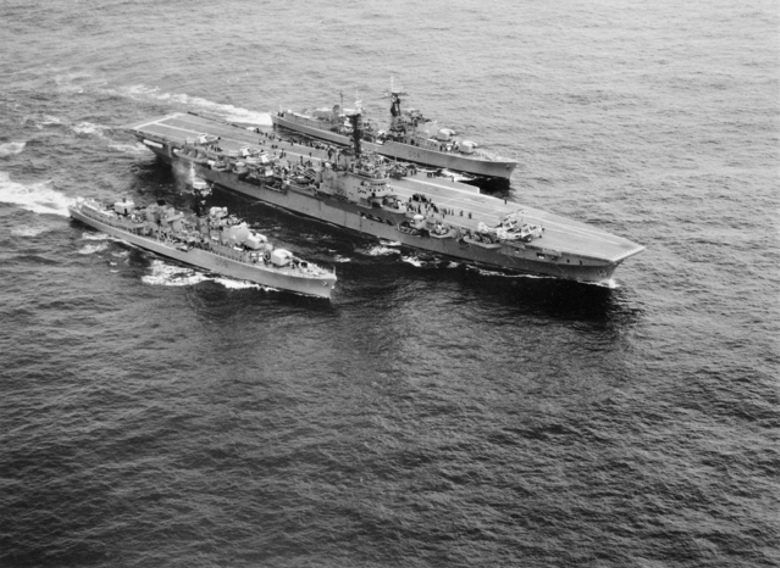
- HMAS Vendetta (left) alongside HMAS Melbourne (center) and HMAS Voyager (right) in 1959

History

Australia
- Name: Vendetta
- Builder: Williamstown Naval Dockyard
- Laid down: 4 July 1949
- Launched: 3 May 1954
- Commissioned: 26 November 1958
- Decommissioned: 9 October 1979
- Motto: Vindico; I Avenge
- Honours and awards: Battle honours: Malaysia 1964–66; Vietnam 1969–70; Seven inherited battle honours
- Fate: Sold for scrap in 1987

General characteristics
- Class & type: Daring-class destroyer
- Displacement: 2,800 tons standard; 3,600 tons full load
- Length: 390 ft (120 m)
- Beam: 43 ft (13 m)
- Draught: 12 ft 9 in (3.89 m) mean; 14 ft 6 in (4.42 m) deep
- Propulsion: 2 × Foster Wheeler boilers; 2 × English Electric geared turbines; 2 shafts; 54,000 hp (40,000 kW)
- Speed: Over 30 knots (56 km/h; 35 mph)
- Range: 3,700 nautical miles (6,900 km; 4,300 mi) at 20 knots (37 km/h; 23 mph)
- Complement: 20 officers, 300 sailors
- Armament: 6 × 4.5-inch guns (3 twin turrets); 6 × 40 mm Bofors (2 twin, 2 single); 5 × 21-inch torpedo tubes (pentad mount); 1 × Limbo mortar

HMAS Vendetta was one of three Daring-class destroyers built for and operated by the Royal Australian Navy (RAN). The destroyer was built by Williamstown Naval Dockyard and entered service in 1958. During her early career, Vendetta was deployed to the Far East Strategic Reserve on multiple occasions. In 1965 and 1966, the destroyer undertook deterrence patrols during the Indonesia-Malaysia Confrontation. Along with several runs escorting the troop transport HMAS Sydney to South Vietnam, from late 1969 to early 1970 Vendetta was assigned to combat operations and became the only Australian-built warship to serve in a shore bombardment role during the Vietnam War.

The ship underwent a two-year modernisation from 1971 to 1973, and in December 1974 was one of thirteen RAN warships involved in Operation Navy Help Darwin after Cyclone Tracy devastated Darwin. Several more deployments were made to the Far East, up until 1978. In October 1979, the destroyer was decommissioned, and served as a parts hulk for sister ship HMAS Vampire. Vendetta was sold for ship breaking in January 1987.

== Design and construction ==
The Royal Australian Navy initially ordered four Daring-class destroyers, which were to be named after the ships of the "Scrap Iron Flotilla" of World War II. The ships were modified during construction: most changes were made to improve habitability, including the installation of air-conditioning. Vendetta and her sister ships were the first all-welded ships to be constructed in Australia.

The Darings had a standard displacement of 2,800 tons, which increased to 3,600 tons at full load. Vendetta and her sisters were 390 feet (120 m) long, with a beam of 43 feet (13 m), and a draught of 12 feet 9 inches (3.89 m) at mean, and 14 feet 6 inches (4.42 m) at full or deep load. Her propulsion system consisted of two Foster Wheeler boilers, feeding two English Electric geared turbines, which provided 54,000 horsepower (40,000 kW) to two propeller shafts. Vendetta could sail at over 30 knots (56 km/h; 35 mph), and had a range of 3,700 nautical miles (6,900 km; 4,300 mi) at 20 knots (37 km/h; 23 mph). Her standard ship's company consisted of 20 officers and 300 sailors.

Vendetta's main armament consisted of six 4.5-inch guns mounted in three twin turrets, two forward and one aft with a maximum rate of fire of 16 rounds per minute per barrel or 96 rounds per minute overall. Her anti-aircraft outfit consisted of six 40 mm Bofors; two single mountings on the forward superstructure, and two twin mountings on the aft superstructure. Five 21-inch torpedo tubes were fitted to a single pentad mount on the deck between the forward and aft superstructures. For anti-submarine warfare, a Limbo anti-submarine mortar was carried on the aft deck, offset to port.

Vendetta was laid down at Williamstown Naval Dockyard, Melbourne on 4 July 1949. By 1950, it was already apparent that the Australian Darings would not be completed on time, as the Australian dockyards were experiencing difficulty in keeping up with the construction schedule. The destroyer was launched on 3 May 1954 by the widow of Hector Waller, who commanded the Scrap Iron Flotilla (including the original HMAS Vendetta) during World War II. On 18 July 1958, on the first occasion Vendetta engaged her engines during builder's trials, the destroyer accidentally rammed the Alfred Dock caisson. The collision was caused when the sailor manning the engine telegraph incorrectly relayed an order of "half astern" as "half ahead", then repeated the mistake when the order was repeated to compensate for the first error. Vendetta's bow breached the caisson, and threatened to flood the dock with HMAS Quickmatch inside. A controlled flooding kept the caisson from failing and prevented damage to Quickmatch or further damage to Vendetta, but the repairs to the destroyer's bow set completion back by three months.

Vendetta was commissioned on 26 November 1958. By the time she was commissioned, the ship's cost increased from A£2.6 million to A£7 million. Only three ships, Voyager, Vendetta, and Vampire, were completed; the fourth was cancelled to save money. Like the preceding destroyer, Vendetta took her name from the concept of vendetta, with the ship's badge depicting a stiletto dagger clenched in a fist, and the ship carrying the motto "Vindico", Latin for "I Avenge".

== Operational history ==
=== 1959–1969 ===
In April 1959, Vendetta operated in New Zealand waters, before visiting New Guinea in June. After a refit, Vendetta and the frigate Quickmatch sailed to Singapore in October for a deployment to the Far East Strategic Reserve (FESR), which lasted until July 1960. Vendetta and the sloop Swan visited Tasmania in February 1961 for the Royal Hobart Regatta. On 19 February, Vendetta rescued passengers from the Shaw Savill vessel Runic, which had run aground on Middleton Reef. The destroyer sailed for her second FESR deployment in April. During the six-month deployment, Vendetta operated on South East Asia Treaty Organisation exercises, visited ports in Borneo, Japan and Malaysia, and represented Australia at the Philippines independence celebrations. On her return, the destroyer underwent a refit at Williamstown.

Vendetta was deployed to the Far East in March 1962, and returned to Sydney in late June. The destroyer visited Noumea in August, then participated in Exercise Tuckerbox off North Queensland. In November, Vendetta visited Fremantle for the 1962 Commonwealth Games. After another refit, the destroyer's fourth FESR deployment commenced on 9 July 1963, when she left Sydney with Quiberon. While in the Far East, the two ships participated in SEATO Exercise Sea Dovetail, visited Japan, and assisted a disabled United States-flagged freighter. Vendetta and Quiberon returned home via Guam and Manus Island on 20 February, after which Vendetta proceeded to Williamstown for refit.

Vendetta returned to the FESR in mid-1964, this time escorting the aircraft carrier Melbourne, and remained in Southeast Asian waters until December. She remained in dock for the first half of 1965 undergoing refits, and on 11 August, sailed for her sixth Far East assignment, in company with Duchess. On 20 September, Vendetta and Duchess met the troop transport Sydney off Manus Island; Sydney was on her second troop transport voyage to South Vietnam. The two destroyers accompanied Sydney to Vung Tau, where they arrived on 28 September, then escorted the troopship clear of the Operation Market Time area before breaking off for Hong Kong. In October, Vendetta operated as plane guard destroyer for HMS Ark Royal. During late 1965 and early 1966, the destroyer was assigned to deterrence patrols off Malaysian Borneo and the Singapore Straits as part of the Commonwealth involvement in the Indonesia-Malaysia Confrontation.

Vendetta and Duchess' returned to Australia in March. On 20 May, the destroyer sailed to Jervis Bay following the sinking of the dredger W. D. Atlas, and spent the next two days searching for survivors and bodies. Vendetta was again involved as a Sydney escort in May and June 1966, during the troopship's fourth voyage. This run ended on 11 June, when Vendetta and Sydney reached Hong Kong. On 3 November, the ship came to the aid of the United States Navy (USN) submarine Tiru, which had run aground on Frederick Reef. After the submarine was refloated, Vendetta escorted her to Brisbane for repairs. On 5 March 1968, Vendetta and Parramatta sailed for six months in the Far East; Vendetta's seventh FESR deployment. The destroyer returned to Australia in October. The destroyer visited Newcastle, New South Wales for Australia Day (26 January) 1969, and operated in New Zealand waters during May.

=== Vietnam deployment ===
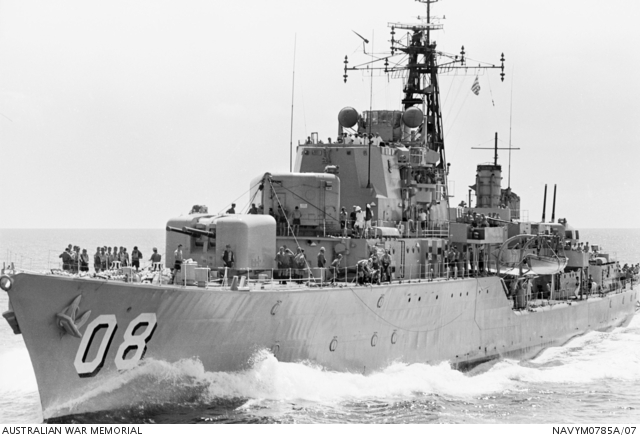
HMAS Vendetta off Vietnam

In 1968, it was realised that the combination of maintenance requirements and other operational deployments meant that none of the RAN's three US-built Perth-class destroyers would be available to serve in the Vietnam War once HMAS Brisbane completed her deployment in late 1969. They started investigating the possibility of deploying a Daring-class destroyer, with the main concern being the supply of 4.5-inch (110 mm) shells, as the USN destroyers were standardised to 5-inch (130 mm) shells. After receiving reassurance from the USN that any logistical issues regarding Australian supplies, including ammunition, were "merely a problem to be overcome", Vendetta was marked for the deployment in November 1968, as she was the only available Daring or River-class vessel available. The decision to send Vendetta meant that the consistent deployment of an Australian warship with the United States Seventh Fleet since March 1967 would continue, and steps towards breaking a 'two-tier' culture within the RAN favouring the Perth-class ships would be made, with associated benefits to morale.

On 15 September 1969, Vendetta left Australia for South Vietnam, and relieved Brisbane at Subic on 26 September. While deployed to Vietnam, the destroyer was placed under the administrative control of Commander Australian Forces Vietnam in addition to that of the Flag Officer Commanding Australian Fleet, while operationally, she was under the command of the Seventh Fleet. A USN lieutenant was assigned to Vendetta to serve as a liaison. Australia was the only allied nation to provide naval support to the United States Navy during the Vietnam War. The destroyer's main activities were the provision of naval gunfire support to assist ground forces, particularly the United States Marine Corps units operating closest to the Vietnamese Demilitarized Zone. Seven ships were usually stationed on the 'gunline', and attacks fell into two categories: 'unspotted' shelling of areas where People's Army of Vietnam or Viet Cong (VC) forces and facilities were known or believed to be, and 'spotted' fire missions in direct support of ground troops. In this role, Vendetta was assigned the callsign "Premier".

Vendetta sailed for a gunline assignment at Danang on 30 September. While en route, the destroyer was replenished by a USN oiler, but there were problems because of the incompatibility between American fuel lines and British intakes, along with the standard pumping pressure being too high for Vendetta's system to handle; the first of numerous difficulties experienced by the British-designed ship operating with an American force. Poor weather meant the ship did not arrive in Danang Harbour until 2 October, and she commenced naval gunfire support missions a day later. After time at Danang, the ship sailed to the II Corps operating area, and continued gunline duties until 24 October. Vendetta sailed to Singapore for maintenance, then resumed gunline duties on 9 November, assigned to the III Corps area. Vendetta moved north to the I Corps area two days later, then down to II Corps on 16 November. At the end of November, the destroyer sailed to Taiwan for rebarrelling and other maintenance. Vendetta returned to the gunline on 21 December, and on 1 January 1970, was called on to assist Market Time operations by firing on two small craft suspected to be on a supply run to VC positions.

On 17 January, Vendetta was forced to sail to Hong Kong for boiler repairs. Returning on 17 February, the destroyer was assigned to III Corps, and operated off Vung Tau in support of Australian and South Vietnamese units. Four days later, Vendetta was reassigned to II Corps. On 6 March, the ship left the gunline to have two of her turrets rebarrelled at Subic, then returned to duty on 13 March. The destroyer sailed to Subic on 23 March, and was relieved by HMAS Hobart on 30 March, after having fired 13,295 4.5-inch shells at 751 targets over five deployments.

The destroyer was the only Australian-built warship to serve as a combatant in Vietnam, and the only Daring-class destroyer to be operationally deployed in the shore bombardment role. Vendetta's deployment to Vietnam under the new Australian White Ensign, and patrols during the Indonesia-Malaysia Confrontation under the old ensign (identical to the British White Ensign), made the destroyer one of only two RAN vessels to deploy operationally under both ensigns. Personnel awards for the deployment included one appointment as an Officer of the Order of the British Empire, two Mentions in Despatches, and 16 Naval Board commendations.

=== 1970–1979 ===
Vendetta sailed for a FESR deployment in September 1970. She escorted the troopship Sydney for the third and final time during the former carrier's seventeenth voyage: Vendetta met the transport off Manila in late October, with the two ships in Vietnam during 31 October and 1 November. During November, the destroyer visited ports in India, before returning to Hong Kong for Christmas. She returned to Sydney in April 1971, and after participating in training exercises and a cruise in northern Australian waters, arrived in Williamstown on 29 September for her half-life modernisation refit. The modernisation cost US$20 million. The fire-control system was replaced, a long-range air radar was installed, and the superstructure was modified, including a roof for the bridge. Vendetta re-entered service on 2 May 1973.

From March until July 1974, Vendetta was again deployed to the Far East. In October, the destroyer represented the RAN at celebrations of the centenary of Fiji's cession to Britain. Following the destruction of Darwin by Cyclone Tracy in December 1974, Vendetta was one of thirteen RAN ships deployed as part of the humanitarian aid mission Operation Navy Help Darwin. The destroyer sailed on 27 December from Sydney, and arrived on 3 January, with shore parties primarily assigned to the Nightcliff area. The destroyer remained in the area until late January. During mid-1975, Vendetta operated in the Far East. In August 1975, following tensions between Indonesia and the former Portuguese colony of East Timor (which cumulated in the Indonesian invasion in December), Vendetta, Vampire, and the supply ship HMAS Supply were pre-positioned in Darwin in case they were needed for evacuations of Australian citizens or Timorese refugees. Action by the ships was not required.

Most of 1976 was spent undergoing maintenance at Williamstown. In 1977, Vendetta was deployed to the Far East. Another deployment was made in 1978, starting in July. While en route, the destroyer visited Honiara to participate in celebrations of Solomon Islands independence from Australia.

== Decommissioning and fate ==
Vendetta paid off on 9 October 1979. After spending time moored near Bradleys Head, during which she was used as a parts hulk for sister ship Vampire, the destroyer was sold for ship breaking. Vendetta was towed to her fate in January 1987.

Following an overhaul of the RAN battle honours system, completed in March 2010, Vendetta's service was recognised with the honours "Malaysia 1964–66" and "Vietnam 1969–70".
