= HMS Diana (D126) =

British destroyer, launched 1952

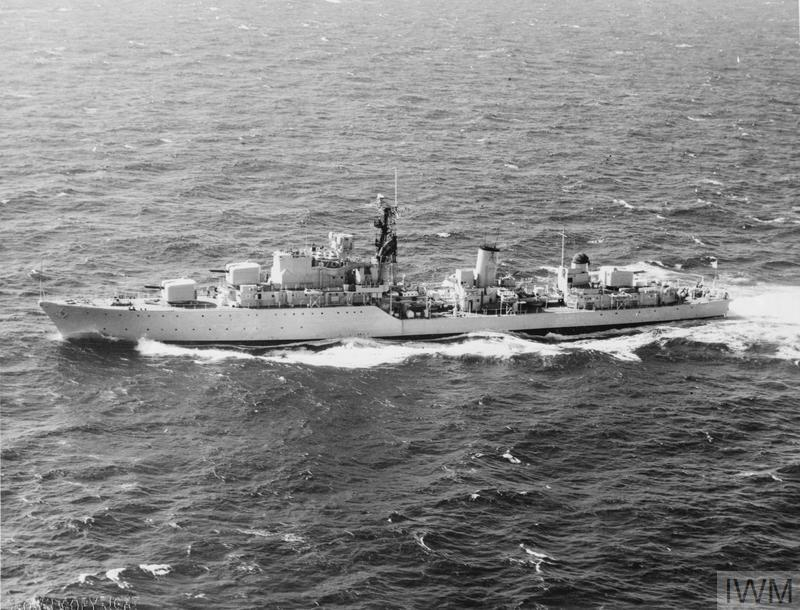
- HMS Diana at sea, 1954

History

United Kingdom
- Name: HMS Diana
- Ordered: 16 February 1945
- Builder: Yarrow and Co. Ltd
- Laid down: 3 April 1947
- Launched: 8 May 1952
- Commissioned: 29 March 1954
- Decommissioned: 1969
- Identification: Pennant number D126
- Fate: Sold to Peruvian Navy, 1969

Peru
- Name: BAP Palacios
- Acquired: 1 December 1969
- Commissioned: April 1973
- Decommissioned: 1993
- Identification: DM-73
- Fate: Discarded 1993

General characteristics
- Class & type: Daring-class destroyer
- Displacement: Standard: 2,830 tons, Full load: 3,820 tons
- Length: 390 ft (120 m)
- Beam: 43 ft (13 m)
- Draught: 13.6 ft (4.1 m)
- Propulsion: 2 Foster Wheeler boilers (650 psi (4,500 kPa), 850 °F), Parsons steam turbines, 2 shafts, 54,000 shp (40 MW)
- Speed: 30 kn (56 km/h)
- Range: 4,400 nmi (8,100 km) at 20 kn (37 km/h)
- Complement: Approximately 300
- Sensors & processing systems: Radar Type 293Q target indication; Radar Type 291 air warning; Radar Type 274 navigation; Radar Type 275 fire control on director Mk.VI; Radar Type 262 fire control on director CRBF and STAAG Mk.II
- Armament: 6 QF 4.5 in /45 (114 mm) Mark V in 3 twin mountings UD Mark VI; 4 40 mm /60 Bofors A/A in 2 twin mounts STAAG Mk.II; 2 40 mm /60 Bofors A/A in 1 twin mount Mk.V; 2 pentad tubes for 21 inch (533 mm) torpedoes Mk.IX; 1 Squid anti submarine mortar

HMS Diana was one of the Daring class of destroyers planned during the Second World War by the Royal Navy. The design reflected developments of the Pacific campaign, including long range and the ability to efficiently Replenish At Sea (RAS).

== Statistics ==
=== Size ===
Diana's standard displacement was 3,610 tons. Length and beam of the ship are 390 feet (120 m) and 43 feet (13 m) respectively, she was capable of steaming at over 30 knots (56 km/h). The normal peacetime complement of Diana was 297 officers and men.

=== Launch ===
The ship was built at Clydebank, Glasgow, by Yarrow and Co. Ltd. (Yard No 1846 ), laid down 3 April 1947 and launched Thursday 8 May 1952 by Lady McGrigor, wife of Admiral of the Fleet Sir Rhoderick McGrigor, and first commissioned 29 March 1954. Originally the name was to be Druid, but this changed to Diana during construction.

At the time Diana was considered a large destroyer, being nearly as big as a pre-war light cruiser. The Daring class was a logical outcome of the Pacific War, where the ability to stay at sea for long periods was of prime importance.

=== Armament ===
The main armament consisted of six 4.5-inch (110 mm) dual-purpose guns in three totally enclosed turrets, two forward, one aft. At the time of building, the control system for the guns was the most advanced in the Royal Navy, being completely radar controlled. The guns were considered, at the time, highly accurate with a high rate of fire.

In summary her armament was: (1960)

- Six 4.5 inch guns
- Two 40 mm Bofors Guns
- Five torpedo tubes
- One triple Squid anti-submarine mortar

=== Electrical supply ===
The ship's electrical power was produced by two turbine generators and three diesel generators. The current used was 440 volts, 60 cycle alternating current (AC) power.

Of the eight Darings, four ships were designed to operate on direct current (DC) for their electrical supply and four to operate on AC. The object was a practical test to determine which form of electrical supply was the most practical. Diana was an AC ship, as were all Royal Navy ships following this 'test'.

=== Propulsion ===
- Engines by Parsons
- Propulsion: geared turbine, 2 shaft

=== Name, goddess and crest ===
"This Diana of ours is a very demanding person, goddesses tend to be that way" Captain G. J. Kirkby, DSC **, Royal Navy, Captain, HMS Diana 1961. The ship's Commission book of 1961 describes Diana (goddess) as having a distinctly complex personality. Apart from being the huntress, by the light of the sun she was pure and chaste; by the light of the moon, however, she became abandoned and dark.

== Career ==
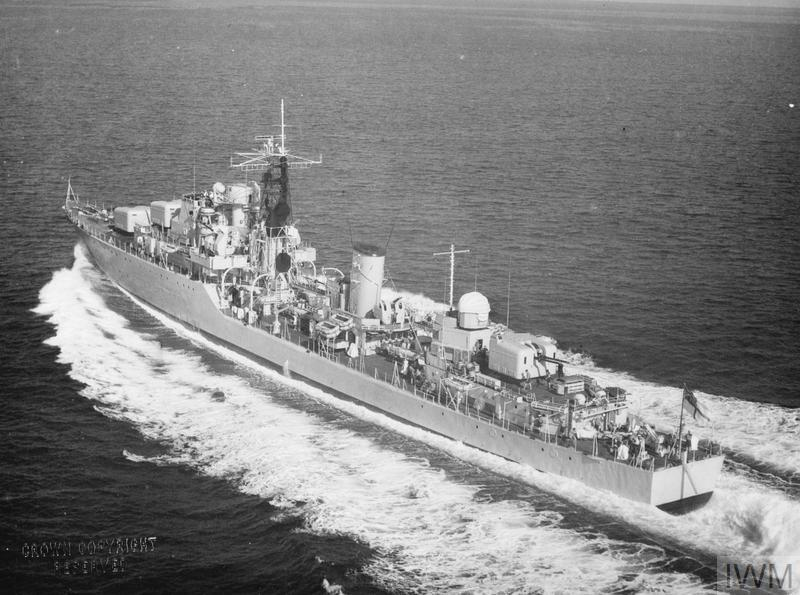
Diana at sea, 1954

Diana saw action during the Suez Crisis, when on 31 October 1956, she sank the Domiat, which was engaged in a one-sided gun duel with the cruiser HMS Newfoundland in the Red Sea, marking the last time a ship was sunk by another in conflict using gunfire alone.

=== South Pacific atomic tests controversy ===
In 1956 Diana was ordered into the radioactive fallout zone of two nuclear weapon tests codenamed Mosaic 1 and Mosaic 2 near the Monte Bello Islands in the Indian Ocean. The aim of the order, given by British defence officials, was to discover the effects of atomic fallout, both on the ship itself and upon its 308-strong crew. Since the exposure, around two-thirds of the crew have died, and survivors attest that a variety of fallout-related diseases are responsible. The ship's then-captain, John Ronald Gower, who died in 2007 aged 95, wrote after sailing through the fallout zone that he much disliked having to 'continue to serve in a ship, parts of which had been unacceptably radioactive'. As of January 2008, the British Ministry of Defence has refused to pay compensation to the remaining crew of Diana, citing a legal technicality that all such claims must be lodged within three years of the diagnosis to which they refer. According to newspaper reports, the decision may see the collapse of the claimants' case, or at the least delay the compensation until 2012, at which time more of the ship's crew may have died. This incident is referred to in the SAS drama Ultimate Force by Ross Kemp's character, SSGt Garvie, who claims his father was a crew member at that time.

On 26 January 1968, Diana was on passage from Gibraltar to Malta when she was ordered to divert to the search for the Israeli submarine Dakar, which had gone missing on her delivery trip from Britain to Israel. After calling at Malta to pick up a medical officer and diving experts, Diana was on course to the search zone when she picked up a distress signal from the Spanish tanker MV Bahia Blanca, which was on fire. After helping Bahia Blanca's crew to extinguish the fire, Diana continued to the search area, taking part in the search operations until 31 January.

=== Sale to the Peruvian Navy ===
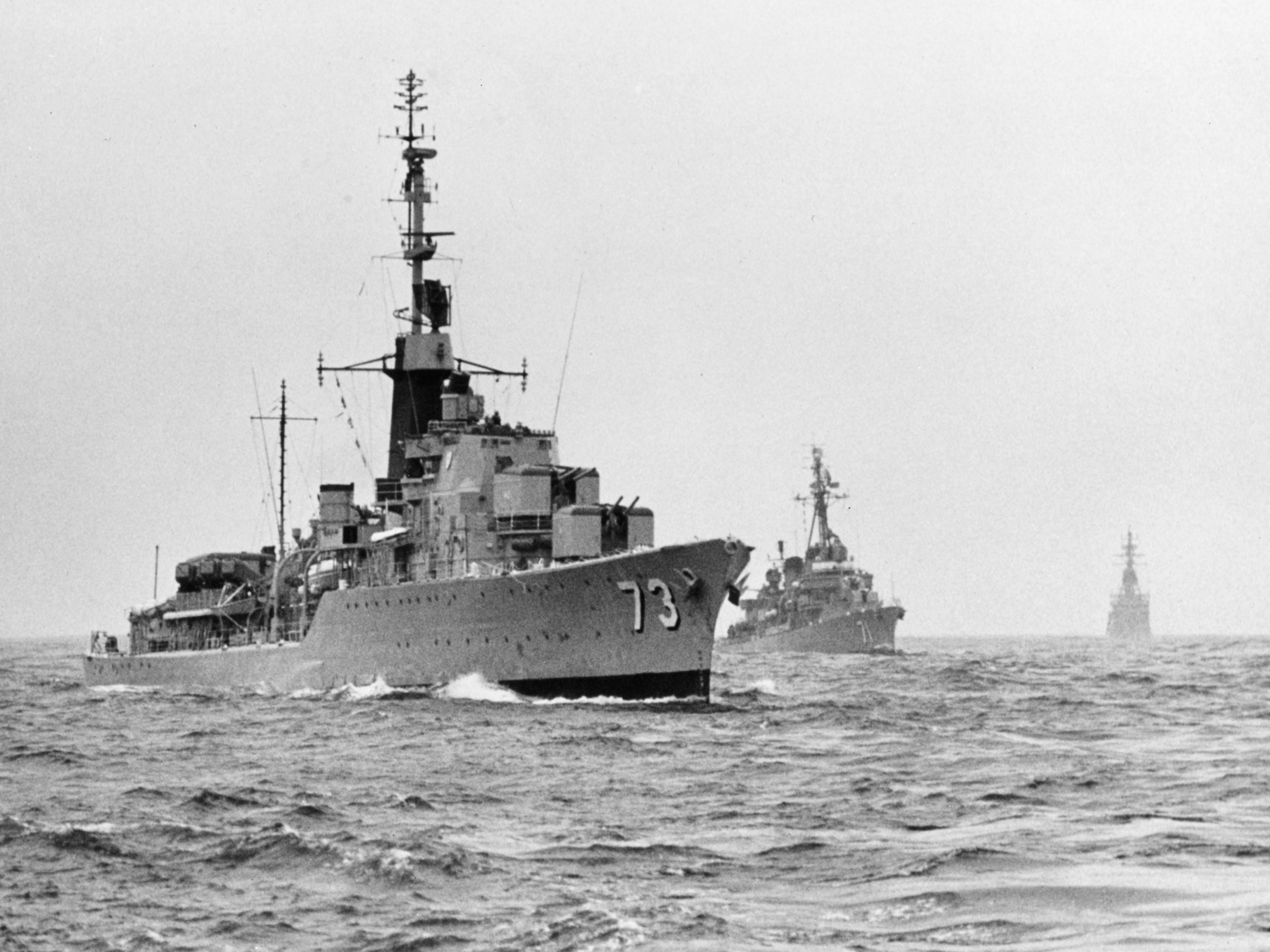
Diana in the Peruvian Navy in September 1973 renamed BAP Palacios (DM-73)

HMS Diana was acquired by the Peruvian Navy in 1969 together with sister ship Decoy. Renamed BAP Palacios (DM-73), the ship was refitted at Cammell Laird, Birkenhead. The refit comprised enclosing the foremast and installing a Plessey AWS-1 radar. The destroyer's armament was further increased with the addition of eight Exocet surface-to-surface missiles in two quadruple mountings.

Palacios was commissioned in April 1973. In 1975, a helicopter landing area was installed which was expanded with the addition of a hangar in 1977-78. This necessitated the removal of the aft 4.5 in gun. The gun was later re-installed and the hangar removed. The refit in 1977-78 also saw the streamlining of the funnel which was also raised, the installation of a Selenia NA-10 director aft for the upgraded twin Breda Bardo 40mm gun mounts and the removal of the Squid mortar and sonar. Palacios served until 1993 when she was stricken.

== Bibliography ==
- HMS Diana, the Fifth Commission of the tenth HMS Diana, 1961-1963, on the occasion of her tenth anniversary, written by members of the Ship's Company and produced with the kind permission of the Commanding Officer.
- Colledge, J. J.; Warlow, Ben (2006) [1969]. Ships of the Royal Navy: The Complete Record of All Fighting Ships of the Royal Navy from the 15th Century to the Present (3rd Rev ed.). London: Chatham Publishing. ISBN 978-1-86176-281-8. OCLC 67375475.
- Gardiner, Robert; Chumbley, Stephen; Budzbon, Przemysław, eds. (1995). Conway's All the World's Fighting Ships 1947-1995. Annapolis, Maryland: Naval Institute Press. ISBN 1-55750-132-7.
- McCart, Neil (2008). Daring Class Destroyers. Fan Publications. ISBN 978-1-904459-33-0.
