= HMAS Jervis Bay (GT 203) =

Former Australian ship

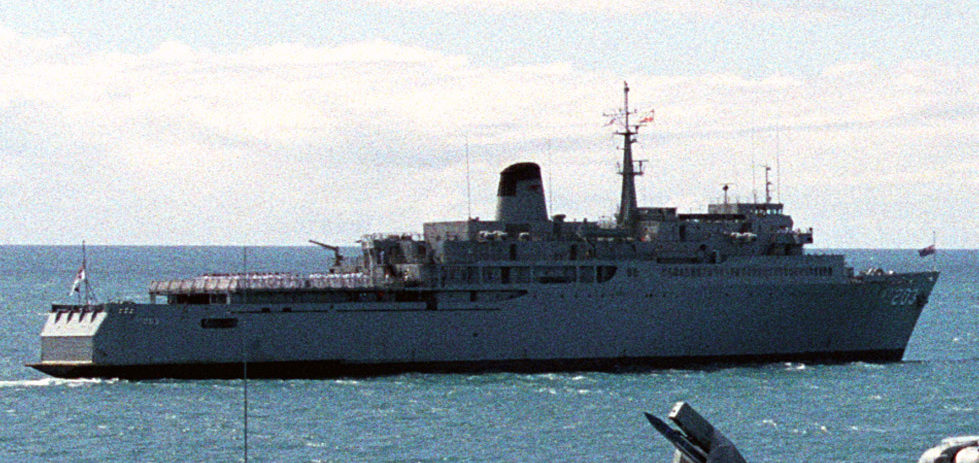
- HMAS Jervis Bay in May 1992

History
- Name: Australian Trader (1969–1977); HMAS Jervis Bay (1977–1995); Agios Andreas (1995–2003); Ajman Leader (2003–2004); Ajman City (2004)
- Builder: State Dockyard
- Laid down: 18 August 1967
- Launched: 17 February 1969
- Acquired: 28 January 1977
- Commissioned: 25 August 1977
- Decommissioned: 18 April 1994
- Identification: IMO number: 6910427
- Motto: Strive Valiantly
- Fate: Scrapped in September 2004
- Badge

General characteristics (Initial construction)
- Type: Roll-on/roll-off ferry
- Tonnage: 7,005 GT, 3,250 t DWT
- Displacement: 8,915 tons
- Length: 135.6 m (445 ft)
- Beam: 21.5 m (71 ft)
- Draught: 6.09 m (20.0 ft)
- Ramps: 1 × stern ramp
- Propulsion: 2 x Pielstick 16PC2-Atlantique-V400 Diesels, 6,500 horsepower (4,800 kW), 2 shafts
- Speed: 19.5 knots (36.1 km/h; 22.4 mph)
- Capacity: 190 passengers, 125 cars
- Crew: 69

General characteristics (Military service)
- Complement: 14 officers and 163 sailors, plus up to 76 trainees
- Armament: Small arms only
- Aviation facilities: Strengthened flight deck for 1 × Westland Sea King helicopter (installed 1987)

General characteristics (after 1995 modifications)
- Tonnage: 11,109 GT
- Installed power: 4 × SEMT Pielstick 12PC2-2V-400; 17,904 kW (combined)
- Capacity: 1,120 passengers, 300 cars

HMAS Jervis Bay (GT 203) was a roll-on/roll-off passenger and vehicle ferry operated by the Royal Australian Navy (RAN) between 1977 and 1994.

The ship was built by the State Dockyard between 1967 and 1969 for service with the Australian National Line, under the name Australian Trader. Initially operating on the Melbourne to Devonport run, Australian Trader was reassigned to the Sydney to Tasmania run in 1972. Passenger service on that run ended in 1976, and at the start of 1977, the vessel was purchased by the RAN for use as a training vessel and troop transport, and was renamed HMAS Jervis Bay.

After decommissioning in 1994, the vessel was sold to Voyager Marine, and renamed Agios Andreas. After modifications to increase her passenger and vehicle capacity, Agios Andreas commenced ferry services between Greece and Turkey in 1995. In 2003, she was sold to Marwan Shipping and Trading, renamed Ajman Leader, and began operations in the Persian Gulf. The ship was renamed Ajman City in 2004, but was sold for scrapping later that year.

== Design and construction ==
The vessel was built as Australian Trader for the Australian National Line by the State Dockyard in Newcastle. The vessel had a displacement of 8,770 tonnes (8,630 long tons; 9,670 short tons) at standard load and 8,195 tonnes (8,066 long tons; 9,033 short tons) at full load, a 7,005 GT value and a 3,250 tonnes deadweight (DWT) value. The vessel was 445 feet (136 m) in length overall, with a beam of 70.5 feet (21.5 m), and a draught of 20 feet (6.1 m). Australian Trader was propelled by two 16PC2 Atlantique 2V400 Pielstick diesels, which supplied 6,500 shaft horsepower (4,800 kW) to the vessel's two propeller shafts, and allowed her to reach 19.5 knots (36.1 km/h; 22.4 mph). The ship was also fitted with a Voith-Schneider bow thruster.

In her initial configuration, the ship could carry 190 passengers: 140 in single- or double-berth cabins, the rest in aircraft-style reclining chairs. 110 cars could be carried in covered parking, with room for an additional 15 in peak conditions, split between the cargo hold and the orlop deck. Larger vehicles (such as semi-trailers) or specially designed shipping containers could be stored on the open aft deck. A stern door allowed for the embarking and disembarking of vehicles. Public amenities onboard included an observation lounge, smoke room and bar, tavern, and a cafeteria (which initially sold only breakfast).

Australian Trader was laid down on 18 August 1967, launched on 17 February 1969, and completed on 17 June 1969.

== Operational history ==
=== Australian National Line ===
On entering service, Australian Trader was assigned to Bass Strait crossings between Melbourne and Devonport; the ship departed from Melbourne on her maiden voyage on 24 June 1969, then commenced paid services on 29 June.

In April 1972, the ferry was returned to the dockyard for modifications, prior to entering service on the Sydney to Hobart and Sydney to Bell Bay/Burnie routes. Because of the longer run, more crew needed to be accommodated; this was achieved by extending the superstructure and converting some of the passenger cabins to crew use, in turn reducing the passenger complement to 172. Australian Trader fared poorly on the run: the service was dogged by bad reviews of the ship's design and amenities, while maritime union strikes disrupted service.

In June 1976, Australian National Line announced plans to cease passenger service between Sydney and Tasmania, with replacement by a cargo-only service aboard Bass Trader. Although due to cease operations on 3 July, delays in the completion of the new vessel kept Australian Trader in operation until the end of July, when she was laid up.

=== Royal Australian Navy ===
Starting on 6 October 1976, the RAN began to show interest in acquiring Australian Trader for use as a training ship and troop transport. The ship was sold to the RAN on 28 January 1977 for $5.7 million, and began $720,000 worth of modifications for naval service, which included the installation of a new navigation bridge and the refitting of some passenger cabins into classrooms. The vessel was commissioned into the RAN as HMAS Jervis Bay on 25 August. Modification was not completed until January 1978. Jervis Bay replaced the destroyer HMAS Duchess in the training role, with Duchess decommissioning in October 1977.

Jervis Bay's primary role was to facilitate the seamanship and navigation training of officer cadets, with logistic transport of Australian Army soldiers and equipment seen as a back-up capability. In RAN service, the ship's company consisted of 14 officers and 163 sailors, with up to 76 trainees embarked at any time. The ship did not carry any fitted weapons, and relied on small arms for defence. The vessel's first training cruise occurred in February 1978.

In December 1980, trials to mate Jervis Bay with the landing craft HMAS Balikpapan were successfully performed in Sydney Harbour. In 1987, the deckhouse was removed, and the ship's aft deck was strengthened to allow a single Sea King or similar helicopter; more extensive plans to allow the embarkation of a flight of six helicopters were shelved. In December 1992, Jervis Bay was deployed via Townsville to Mogadishu in support of 1RAR and the US-led Operation Restore Hope. Jervis Bay paid off on 18 April 1994.

=== Post-military service ===
The ship was put up for sale in October 1994. On 23 December, she was sold to Liberian company Voyager Marine, renamed Agios Andreas, and registered to Kingstown, Saint Vincent. The ship sailed from Sydney on 14 January 1995; the voyage to Greece was made using the port engine only, as the starboard engine had been disassembled with the ship to receive new engines in Greece. Once in Greece, Agios Andreas underwent major modifications including the installation of new engines from the ships to be scrapped, fire damaged Ionian Express, extension of the superstructure along the length of the hull; this and other modifications resulted in a passenger capacity increase to 1,120 (316 in cabins), vehicle capacity to grow to 300 cars, and the ship's gross tonnage to become 11,109 GT. On completion, the ship began ferry services between Greece and Turkey, under the operation of Greek company Med Link Lines.

In November 2003, the ship was sold to Marwan Shipping and Trading of Comoros, renamed Ajman Leader, and began operations in the Persian Gulf out of Dubai. In February 2004, ownership was transferred to Marwan Shipping and Trading of Sharjah, United Arab Emirates, and the vessel was renamed Ajman City.

In September 2004, Ajam City was sold to scrapping and was taken to Alang, India.
