= HMS Nith (K215) =

River-class frigate of the Royal and Egyptian Navy

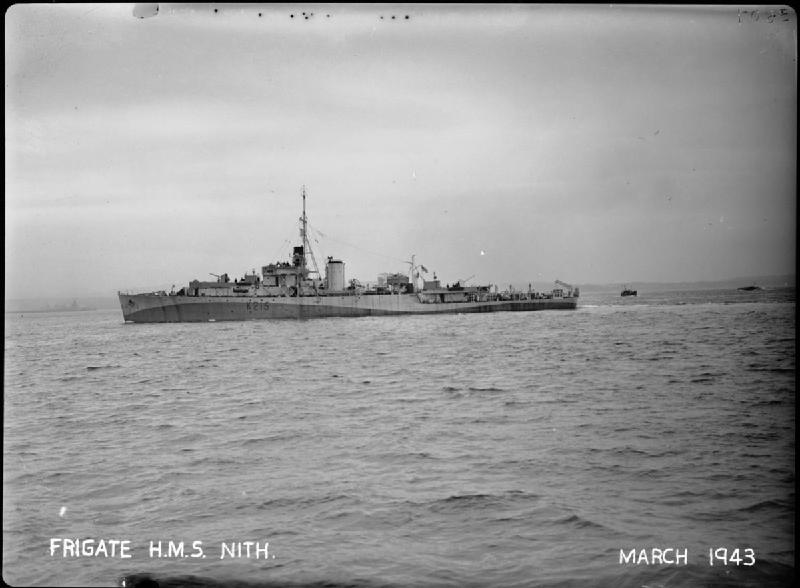
- HMS Nith during WWII

History

United Kingdom
- Name: HMS Nith
- Namesake: River Nith
- Builder: Henry Robb Ltd., Leith
- Laid down: 5 September 1941
- Launched: 25 September 1942
- Commissioned: 16 February 1943
- Fate: Sold to Egyptian Navy in 1948

History

Republic of Egypt
- Name: Domiat
- Namesake: Damietta
- Commissioned: 1948
- Fate: Sunk 31 October 1956

General characteristics As built
- Displacement: 1,370 long tons (1,392 t); 1,830 long tons (1,859 t) (deep load)
- Length: 283 ft (86.3 m) p/p; 301.25 ft (91.8 m) o/a
- Beam: 36 ft 6 in (11.1 m)
- Draught: 9 ft (2.7 m); 13 ft (4.0 m) (deep load)
- Propulsion: 2 × Admiralty 3-drum boilers, 2 shafts, reciprocating vertical triple expansion, 5,500 ihp (4,100 kW)
- Speed: 20 knots (37 km/h; 23 mph); 20.5 knots (38.0 km/h; 23.6 mph) (turbine ships)
- Range: 7,200 nmi (13,300 km; 8,300 mi) at 12 knots (22 km/h; 14 mph) with; 440 long tons (447 t) oil fuel
- Complement: 107
- Armament: 2 × QF 4 in (102 mm)/40 Mk.XIX guns, single mounts CP Mk.XXIII; Up to 10 × QF 20 mm (0.79 in) Oerlikon A/A on twin mounts Mk.V and single mounts Mk.III; 1 × Hedgehog 24 spigot A/S projector; 8 x depth charge throwers, 2 x rails, Up to 150 depth charges

HMS Nith was a River-class frigate of the Royal Navy during World War II. In 1948, she was transferred to the Egyptian Navy and given the name Domiat.

== World War II ==
During the war, the ship served in Normandy, India, the Far East, and in the Reserve Fleet at Harwich, England.

Having failed her sea trials due to lack of speed, HMS Nith was prepared as a Brigade headquarters ship for the D-Day Normandy landings, acting as the 231st Infantry Brigade HQ, delivering Brigadier Stanier Alexander Beville Gibbons Stanier to Gold Beach. HMS Nith was then detailed with the task of coordinating landing ships going ashore off Courseulles, and as a result of craft not being able to identify her, the Nith had her bridge painted orange.

On being stationed offshore, a crewman from the Nith recollects seeing a German mini-sub moored to a British minesweeper aft of HMS Nith. The mini-sub still contained the dead pilot in its cockpit, with a shell hole through the mini-sub canopy clearly visible. Subsequent efforts to trace the history of this mini-sub have proved fruitless.

On the night of 13 / 14 June 1944 [Source for these dates: 'Bomber Units of the Luftwaffe 1933-1945, Vol.2', de Zeng/Stankey (Classic), p.281], whilst in the Baie de Seine, HMS Nith was severely damaged by a Mistel, a German prototype drone aircraft packed with explosives, remotely controlled by a mother aircraft that released the drone after being previously attached to it. Nine crew were instantly killed and were buried at sea, with a tenth succumbing to his wounds shortly after. This tenth casualty being buried in Hollybrook CWGC cemetery in Southampton. An American hospital ship took off the twenty six wounded and the Nith was then towed back to Whites shipyard at Cowes on the Isle of Wight for repairs.

By October 1944, HMS Nith had been repaired since the Mistel attack and was then sent to the Far East theatre, where on occasion she transported Japanese PoWs. HMS Nith took part in the Rangoon victory fleet review undertaken by Lord Mountbatten in June 1945. HMS Nith can be seen in a newsreel of the review.

In 1948, she was transferred to the Egyptian Navy and given the name Domiat.

== Sinking ==
As part of the Suez Crisis, on the night of 31 October 1956 in the northern Red Sea, the British light cruiser HMS Newfoundland challenged and engaged the Egyptian frigate Domiat, reducing it to a burning hulk in a brief gun battle. The Egyptian warship was then sunk by escorting destroyer HMS Diana, with 69 surviving Egyptian sailors rescued.

== Bibliography ==
- Colledge, J. J.; Warlow, Ben (2006) [1969]. Ships of the Royal Navy: The Complete Record of All Fighting Ships of the Royal Navy from the 15th Century to the Present (3rd Rev ed.). London: Chatham Publishing. ISBN 978-1-86176-281-8. OCLC 67375475.
- Lavery, Brian (2006). River-Class Frigates and the Battle of the Atlantic: A Technical and Social History. London: National Maritime Museum. ISBN 0-948065-73-7.
- Lenton, H. T. (1998). British & Empire Warships of the Second World War. Annapolis, Maryland: Naval Institute Press. ISBN 1-55750-048-7.
- Marriott, Leo (1983). Royal Navy Frigates 1945–1983. Ian Allan. ISBN 0-7110-1322-5.
