= HMS Diamond (D35) =

British Royal Navy destroyer, launched 1950

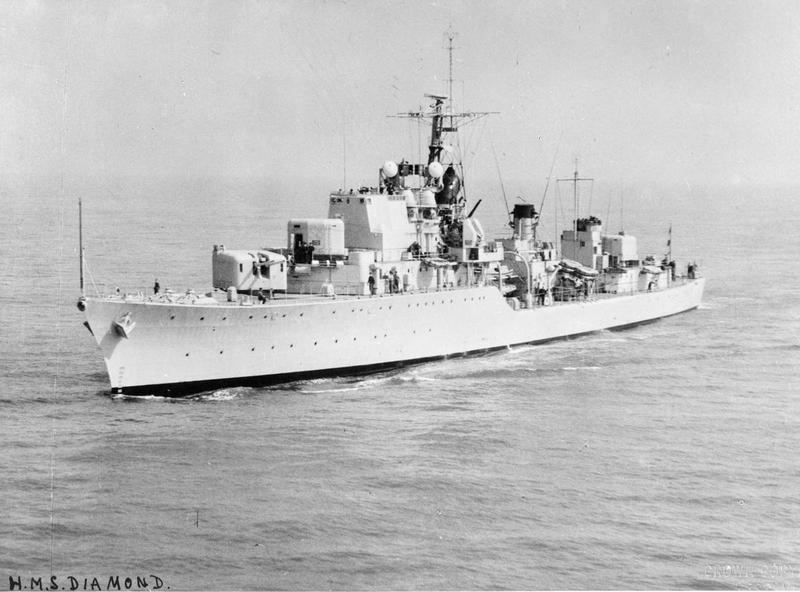
- HMS Diamond, July 1952

History

United Kingdom
- Name: HMS Diamond
- Ordered: 24 January 1945
- Builder: John Brown & Company, Clydebank
- Yard number: 632
- Laid down: 15 March 1949
- Launched: 14 June 1950
- Commissioned: 21 February 1952
- Identification: Pennant number: D35
- Motto: Honor clarissima gemma; (Latin: "Honour is the brightest jewel")
- Fate: Scrapped at Rainham, Kent, 12 November 1981
- Badge

General characteristics
- Class & type: Daring-class destroyer
- Displacement: Standard: 2,830 tons, full load: 3,820 tons
- Length: 391 ft (119 m)
- Beam: 43 ft (13 m)
- Draught: 22.6 ft (6.9 m)
- Propulsion: 54,000 shp (40 MW); 2 × Foster Wheeler boilers (650 psi, 850 °F); 2 × Parsons steam turbines; 2 × shafts
- Speed: 30 knots (56 km/h)
- Range: 4,400 nautical miles (8,100 km) at 20 knots (37 km/h)
- Complement: Approximately 300
- Sensors & processing systems: Radar Type 293Q target indication; Radar Type 291 air warning; Radar Type 274 navigation; Radar Type 275 fire control on director Mk.VI; Radar Type 262 fire control on director CRBF and STAAG Mk.II
- Armament: 6 × QF 4.5 in /45 (114 mm) Mark V in 3 twin mountings UD Mark VI; 4 × 40 mm /60 Bofors A/A in 2 twin mounts STAAG Mk.II; 2 × 40 mm /60 Bofors A/A in 1 twin mount Mk.V; 2 × pentad tubes for 21 inch (533 mm) torpedoes Mk.IX; 1 × Squid anti submarine mortar

HMS Diamond was a Daring-class destroyer of the British Royal Navy. She was built by John Brown & Company in Clydebank, Scotland, and launched on 14 June 1950. This ship was John Brown & Company's first all-welded ship (as opposed to the rivetted construction more commonly used up to that time).

== Service history ==
In 1953 Diamond took part in the Fleet Review to celebrate the Coronation of Queen Elizabeth II. On 29 September 1953, she sustained severe bow damage in a collision with the cruiser Swiftsure during Exercise Mariner, held off the coast of Iceland.

In 1956 Diamond was sent into Port Said to show the flag prior to the Franco-British assault, but the Egyptian government was unmoved and she sailed out to join the main attack force for the Suez landings at Port Said. She underwent a refit in 1959 at Chatham Dockyard. In 1964 she was involved in another collision, this time with the frigate Salisbury, in the English Channel during a naval demonstration.

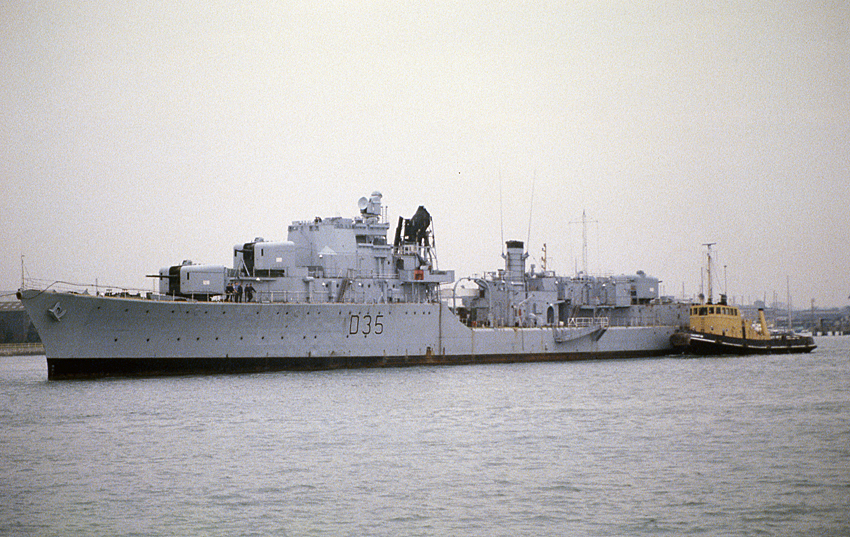
HMS Diamond leaving Portsmouth for the last time

In 1970, she became one of two Harbour Training Ships moored alongside Priddy's Hard jetty in Gosport and attached to the Marine Engineering School at nearby HMS Sultan and remained in this role until replaced by HMS Londonderry. For most of this time, her steam plant remained maintained and useable for watchkeeping familiarisation purposes. HMS Diamond was scrapped in Rainham in Kent in 1981.

== Publications ==
- Colledge, J. J.; Warlow, Ben (2006) [1969]. Ships of the Royal Navy: The Complete Record of All Fighting Ships of the Royal Navy from the 15th Century to the Present (3rd Rev ed.). London: Chatham Publishing. ISBN 978-1-86176-281-8. OCLC 67375475.
- McCart, Neil (2008). Daring Class Destroyers. Fan Publications. ISBN 978-1-904459-33-0.
