= List of ship names of the Royal Navy (I–L) =

This is a list of Royal Navy ship names starting with I, J, K, and L.

== I ==
- Ibis
- Icarus
- Icicle
- Ickford
- Ignition
- Ildefonso
- Ilex
- Ilfracombe
- Illustrious
- Ilmington
- Ilston
- Imaum
- Immortalité
- Imogen
- Imogene
- Imperial
- Imperieuse
- Impeteux
- Impey
- Implacable
- Impregnable
- Impregnable I
- Impregnable II
- Impregnable III
- Impregnable IV
- Impulsive
- Incendiary
- Inconstant
- Increase
- Indefatigable
- Independencia
- India
- Indian
- Indignant
- Indomitable
- Indus
- Indus II
- Indus III
- Indus IV
- Indus V
- Industry
- Infanta Don Carlos
- Infanta
- Infernal
- Inflexible
- Inglefield
- Inglesham
- Inglis
- Ingonish
- Inman
- Insolent
- Inspector
- Instow
- Integrity
- Intelligence
- Intelligent
- Intrepid
- Invention
- Invermoriston
- Inverness
- Inverlyon
- Investigator
- Inveterate
- Invicta
- Invincible
- Iolaire
- Iphigenia
- Ipswich
- Iris
- Iron Duke
- Iroquois
- Irresistible
- Irvine
- Irwell
- Isabella
- Isham
- Isinglass
- Isis
- Iskra
- Islay
- Isle of Guernsey
- Isle of May
- Isle of Thanet
- Isle of Wight
- Islip
- Ister
- Itchen
- Ithuriel
- Ivanhoe
- Iveston
- Ivy

== J ==
- J1
- J2
- J3
- J4
- J5
- J6
- J7
- Jack
- Jack Tar
- Jackal
- Jackdaw
- Jackton
- Jaguar
- Jahde
- Jalouse
- Jamaica
- James
- James & Eliza
- James Galley
- James Watt
- Jane
- Janissary
- Janus
- Jaseur
- Jasmine
- Jason
- Jasper
- Java
- Javelin
- Jed
- Jellicoe
- Jemmy
- Jennet
- Jennet Pyrwin
- Jeremiah
- Jerfalcon
- Jersey
- Jersey Hulk
- Jervis
- Jervis Bay
- Jessamine
- Jesus
- Jesus & Mary
- Jesus of Lübeck
- Jewel
- John
- John & Alexander
- John & Martha
- John & Peter
- John & Sarah
- John Ballinger
- John Baptist
- John Ebbs
- John Evangelist
- John of Dublin
- John of Greenwich
- Johnson
- Jolly
- Jonquil
- Joseph
- Joseph Straker
- Josiah
- Joyful
- Jubilant
- Julia
- Julian
- Juliet
- Julius
- Jumna
- Junella
- Juniper
- Juno
- Junon
- Jupiter
- Juste
- Justitia
- Jutland

== K ==
- K1
- K2
- K3
- K4
- K5
- K6
- K7
- K8
- K9
- K10
- K11
- K12
- K13
- K14
- K15
- K16
- K17
- K18
- K19
- K20
- K21
- K22
- K23
- K24
- K25
- K26
- K27
- K28
- Kale
- Kalgoorlie
- Kampar
- Kandahar
- Kangaroo
- Karakatta
- Karanja
- Karrakatta
- Kashmir
- Katherine
- Katherine Bark
- Katherine Breton
- Katherine Fortileza
- Katherine Galley
- Katoomba
- Keats
- Kedleston
- Keith
- Kelana
- Kellett
- Kellington
- Kelly
- Kelvin
- Kemerton
- Kempenfelt
- Kempthorne
- Kempton
- Kendal
- Kenilworth Castle
- Kennet
- Kennington
- Kennymore
- Kent
- Kentish
- Kenya
- Keppel
- Keren
- Kertch
- Keryado
- Kestrel
- Kew
- Khartoum
- Khedive
- Kiawo
- Kilbane
- Kilbarchan
- Kilbeggan
- Kilberry
- Kilbirnie
- Kilbrachan
- Kilbride
- Kilbrittain
- Kilburn
- Kilby
- Kilcar
- Kilcavan
- Kilchattan
- Kilchreest
- Kilchrenan
- Kilchvan
- Kilclare
- Kilcolgan
- Kilconnan
- Kilconnel
- Kilcoole
- Kilcornie
- Kilcot
- Kilcreggan
- Killcullen
- Kilcurrig
- Kildale
- Kildarton
- Kildary
- Kildavin
- Kildimo
- Kildonan Castle
- Kildorough
- Kildorry
- Kildpart
- Kildress
- Kildwick
- Kilfenora
- Kilfinny
- Kilfree
- Kilfullert
- Kilgarvan
- Kilglass
- Kilgobnet
- Kilgowan
- Kilham
- Kilhampton
- Kilkee
- Kilkeel
- Kilkenny
- Kilkenzie
- Kilkerrin
- Kilkhampton
- Killadoon
- Killaloo
- Killane
- Killarney
- Killary
- Killegan
- Killegar
- Killena
- Killerig
- Killiecrankie
- Killeney
- Killour
- Killowen
- Killybegs
- Killygordon
- Kilmacrennan
- Kilmaine
- Kilmalcolm
- Kilmallock
- Kilmanahan
- Kilmarnock
- Kilmartin
- Kilmead
- Kilmelford
- Kilmersdon
- Kilmington
- Kilmore
- Kilmorey
- Kilmuckridge
- Kilmun
- Kimberley
- Kincardine
- King Alfred
- King David
- King Edward VII
- King George V
- King Henry
- King of Prussia
- King Orry
- King Sol
- Kingcup
- Kingfish
- Kingfisher
- Kingham
- Kingsale
- Kingsford
- Kingsmill
- Kingston
- Kingston Alalite
- Kingston Beryl
- Kingston Cairngorm
- Kingston Cornelian
- Kingston Galena
- Kingston Onyx
- Kingston Sapphire
- Kingussie
- Kinnairds Head
- Kinross
- Kinsale
- Kinsha
- Kipling
- Kirkliston
- Kistna
- Kitchen
- Kite
- Kittiwake
- Knaresborough Castle
- Knight of Malta
- Knole
- Kopanes
- Kos XXII
- Kos XXIII
- Krakowiak
- Kronprincen
- Kronprincessen
- Kudat
- Kujawiak
- Kung Wo

== L ==
- L1
- L2
- L3
- L4
- L5
- L6
- L7
- L8
- L9
- L10
- L11
- L12
- L14
- L15
- L16
- L17
- L18
- L19
- L20
- L21
- L22
- L23
- L24
- L25
- L26
- L27
- L33
- L52
- L53
- L54
- L55
- L56
- L69
- L71
- La Capricieuse
- La Chieftain
- La Combatante
- La Cordeliere
- La Flore
- La Loire
- La Malbai
- La Malouine
- La Melpomène
- La Moqueuse
- L'Abondance
- Labuan
- Laburnum
- Lacedaemonian
- Lachine
- Lachlan
- Lachute
- Ladas
- Ladava
- Lady Canning
- Lady Elsa
- Lady Falkland
- Lady Hogarth
- Lady Lilian
- Lady Loch
- Lady Madeleine
- Lady Nelson
- Lady Philomena
- Lady Prevost
- Lady Shirley
- Lady Slater
- Lady Somers
- Lady Taylor
- Ladybird
- Lae
- Laertes
- Laforey
- Lagan
- L'Aglaia
- Laird's Isle
- Lal
- Laleston
- Lalmourn
- Lamerton
- Lamport
- Lanark
- Lancaster
- Lancaster Castle
- Lance
- Landguard
- Landrail
- Land Tortoise
- Langport
- Lantau
- Lanton
- Lapwing
- Largo Bay
- Largs
- Lark
- Larke
- Larkspur
- Larne
- Lasalle
- Lasham
- Lassoo
- Latona
- Latrobe
- Lauderdale
- Launceston
- Launceston Castle
- Laura
- Laurel
- Laurestinus
- Lauzon
- Lavender
- Laverock
- Lavinia
- Lawford
- Lawrence
- Lawson
- Laymoor
- Le Havre
- Le Robecque
- Le Triomphant
- Leamington
- Leander
- Leaside
- Leda
- Ledbury
- Ledsham
- Lee
- Leeds Castle
- Leeds
- Leeuwin
- Legere
- Legion
- L'Egyptienne
- Leicester
- Leighton
- Leith
- Lennox
- Lenox
- Leocadia
- Leonidas
- Leopard
- Leopard's Whelp
- Lethbridge
- L'Etoile
- Letterston
- Levant
- Leven
- Leveret
- Leverton
- Leviathan
- Levis
- Lewes
- Lewiston
- Leyden
- L'Hercule
- Li Wo
- Liberty
- Liberty IV
- Lichfield
- Lichfield Prize
- Licorne
- Liddesdale
- Liffey
- Ligaera
- HMS Ligonier
- Lightfoot
- Lightning
- Lilac
- Lily
- Limbourne
- L'Impassable
- Linaria
- Lincoln
- L'Incomprise
- Lindisfarne
- Lindsey
- Ling
- Linganbar
- Lingfield
- Linnet
- Lion
- Lioness
- Lion's Whelp
- Lisburne
- Lismore
- Liston
- Listowel
- Lithgow
- Little Belt
- Little Charity
- Little London
- Little Unicorn
- Little Victory
- Littleham
- Lively
- Liverpool
- Lizard
- Llandaff
- Llandudno
- Llewellyn
- Lobelia
- Loch Achanault
- Loch Achray
- Loch Affric
- Loch Alvie
- Loch Ard
- Loch Arkaig
- Loch Arklet
- Loch Arnish
- Loch Assynt
- Loch Awe
- Loch Badcall
- Loch Boisdale
- Loch Bracadale
- Loch Carloway
- Loch Caroy
- Loch Carron
- Loch Clunie
- Loch Coulside
- Loch Craggie
- Loch Cree
- Loch Creran
- Loch Doine
- Loch Doon
- Loch Dunvegan
- Loch Earn
- Loch Eck
- Loch Eil
- Loch Enock
- Loch Ericht
- Loch Erisort
- Loch Eye
- Loch Eynort
- Loch Fada
- Loch Fannich
- Loch Fionn
- Loch Frisa
- Loch Fyne
- Loch Garasdale
- Loch Garve
- Loch Glashan
- Loch Glendhu
- Loch Goil
- Loch Gorm
- Loch Griam
- Loch Harport
- Loch Harray
- Loch Heilen
- Loch Hourne
- Loch Inchard
- Loch Insh
- Loch Katrine
- Loch Ken
- Loch Kilbirnie
- Loch Killin
- Loch Killisport
- Loch Kirbister
- Loch Kirkaig
- Loch Kishorn
- Loch Knockie
- Loch Laro
- Loch Laxford
- Loch Linfern
- Loch Linnhe
- Loch Lomond
- Loch Lubnaig
- Loch Lurgain
- Loch Lydoch
- Loch Lyon
- Loch Maberry
- Loch Maddy
- Loch Minnick
- Loch Mochrum
- Loch More
- Loch Morlich
- Loch Muick
- Loch Nell
- Loch Odairn
- Loch Ossain
- Loch Quoich
- Loch Roan
- Loch Ronald
- Loch Ruthven
- Loch Ryan
- Loch Scamdale
- Loch Scavaig
- Loch Scridain
- Loch Seaforth
- Loch Sheallag
- Loch Sheil
- Loch Shin
- Loch Skaig
- Loch Skerrow
- Loch Stemster
- Loch Stenness
- Loch Striven
- Loch Sunart
- Loch Swannay
- Loch Swin
- Loch Tanna
- Loch Tarbert
- Loch Tilt
- Loch Torridon
- Loch Tralaig
- Loch Tummel
- Loch Urigill
- Loch Vanavie
- Loch Vennachar
- Loch Veyatie
- Loch Watten
- Lochinvar
- Lochy
- Lockeport
- Locust
- Lofoten
- London
- Londonderry
- Longbow
- Longbranch
- Longford
- Longueuil
- Lonsdale
- Looe
- Lookout
- Loosestrife
- Lord Clive
- Lord Eldon
- Lord Howe
- Lord Melville
- Lord Mulgrave
- Lord Nelson
- Lord Nuffield
- Lord Raglan
- Lord Roberts
- Lord Warden
- Loring
- Lossie
- Lothian
- Lotus
- Louis
- Louisa
- Louisburg
- Loup Cervier
- Louvain
- Love and Friendship
- Lowestoffe
- Lowestoffe Prize
- Lowestoft
- Loyal
- Loyal Chancellor
- Loyal Example
- Loyal Exploit
- Loyal Explorer
- Loyal Express
- Loyal London
- Loyal Watcher
- Loyalist
- Loyalty
- LST 3001
- LST 3002
- LST 3003
- LST 3004
- LST 3005
- LST 3006
- LST 3007
- LST 3008
- LST 3009
- LST 3010
- LST 3011
- LST 3012
- LST 3013
- LST 3014
- LST 3015
- LST 3016
- LST 3017
- LST 3018
- LST 3019
- LST 3020
- LST 3021
- LST 3022
- LST 3023
- LST 3024
- LST 3025
- LST 3026
- LST 3027
- LST 3028
- LST 3029
- LST 3030
- LST 3031
- LST 3032
- LST 3033
- LST 3034
- LST 3035
- LST 3036
- LST 3037
- LST 3038
- LST 3039
- LST 3040
- LST 3041
- LST 3042
- LST 3043
- LST 3044
- LST 3045
- LST 3501
- LST 3502
- LST 3503
- LST 3504
- LST 3505
- LST 3506
- LST 3507
- LST 3508
- LST 3509
- LST 3510
- LST 3511
- LST 3512
- LST 3513
- LST 3514
- LST 3515
- LST 3516
- LST 3517
- LST 3518
- LST 3519
- LST 3520
- LST 3521
- LST 3522
- LST 3523
- LST 3524
- LST 3525
- LST 3526
- LST 3527
- LST 3528
- LST 3530
- LST 3531
- LST 3532
- LST 3533
- LST 3534
- LST 3535
- Luce Bay
- Lucia
- Lucifer
- Ludham
- Ludlow
- Ludlow Castle
- Lullington
- Lulworth
- Lunenburg
- Lupin
- Lurcher
- Lusitania
- Lutin
- Lutine
- Lychnis
- Lydd
- Lydiard
- Lydney
- Lyemun
- Lyme
- Lyme Regis
- Lynn
- Lynx
- Lyon
- Lyra
- Lys
- Lysander

== See also ==
- List of aircraft carriers of the Royal Navy
- List of amphibious warfare ships of the Royal Navy
- List of battlecruisers of the Royal Navy
- List of pre-dreadnought battleships of the Royal Navy
- List of dreadnought battleships of the Royal Navy
- List of cruiser classes of the Royal Navy
- List of destroyer classes of the Royal Navy
- List of patrol vessels of the Royal Navy
- List of frigate classes of the Royal Navy
- List of mine countermeasure vessels of the Royal Navy (includes minesweepers and mine hunters)
- List of monitors of the Royal Navy
- List of Royal Fleet Auxiliary ship names
- List of Royal Navy shore establishments
- List of submarines of the Royal Navy
- List of survey vessels of the Royal Navy
