= Alexander Edgar =

British Royal Navy Rear-Admiral

Rear Admiral Alexander Edgar
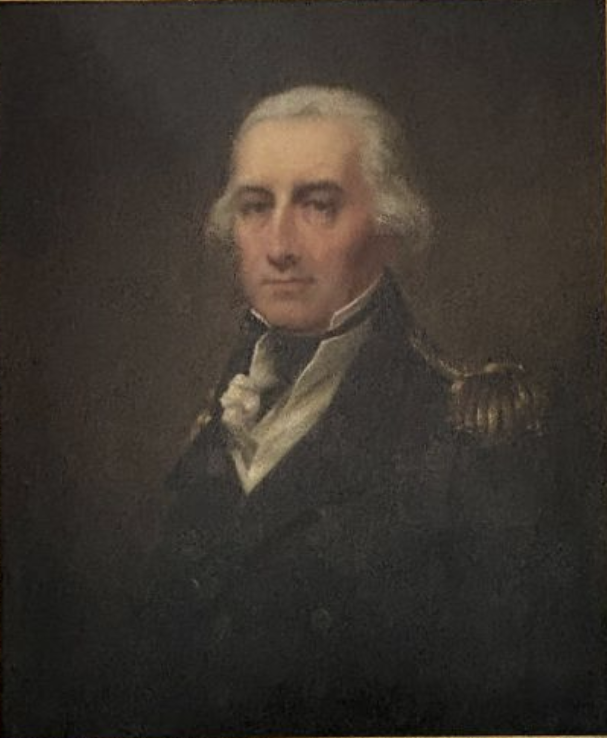
- "Admiral Alexander Edgar of Wedderlie" by Moussa Ayoub, 1930
- Born: 17 August 1737; Westruther, Scottish Borders, Scotland
- Died: 20 February 1817 (aged 79); Bedford Street, Bedford Square, London
- Burial place: St. George the Martyr Church; Holborn, London, England
- Spouse: Margaretta Sophia Johnston
- Children: Maria Bethia Edgar
- Military career
- Allegiance: Great Britain
- Branch: Royal Navy
- Service years: December 27, 1747 - December 20, 1799
- Rank: Superannuated Rear-Admiral
- Commands: HMS Vulcan; HMS Strombolo; HMS Royal Oak; HMS Clinton; HMS Ocean; HMS Medway; HMS Leocadia; HMS Prince George; HMS Illustrious
- Known for: Last Laird of Wedderlie
- Conflicts: Seven Years' War; Battle of the Plains of Abraham; American War of Independence; Battle of Ushant (1778); Relief of Gibraltar (1781); Battle of Ushant (1781)

Rear-Admiral Alexander Edgar (c. 1736 – 1817) was a prominent Scottish officer of the British Royal Navy. His early career saw him fighting in the Seven Years' War, where he would participate in the Capture of Quebec. He would later take part in the American War of Independence, where he would participate in the First Battle of Ushant, The Siege of Gibraltar, and The Second Battle of Ushant. Edgar served on a variety of ships, from the fireship HMS Vesuvius to the 1st rate ship-of-the-line HMS Victory.

He was also historically significant as the final male heir and last Laird of Wedderlie, marking the end of an ancient Scottish Border lineage that appears by deeds as far back as 1170.

== Early life and family background ==
Alexander Edgar was born on 17 August 1736 in Westruther, Scotland. Alexander was the son of John Edgar of Wedderlie and Mary Home. He was a direct descendant of the ancient Edgars of Wedderlie, a historic family of Scottish Border lairds who held feudal landholdings in the Berwickshire Merse dating back to 1170. The family traced their direct ancestry to the medieval Celtic Earls of Dunbar and March.

By the time of Alexander's birth, the family's centuries-old financial security had collapsed under a mountain of compounding debts and shifting economic realities. In 1733, his father John Edgar went bankrupt and was forced to sell their ancestral home, Wedderlie House, to Robert, Lord Blantyre, ending over 470 years of continuous family ownership. His father ultimately died bankrupt, leaving Edgar without an inheritance or the familial financial backing typical for naval officers of his class. Alexander Edgar entered the Royal Navy at approximately 11 years of age on December 29, 1747.

== Early career and the Seven Years' War ==
Edgar entered the service on December 29, 1747, as a Midshipman. During his time as a Midshipman, he would serve on several vessels. He notably served aboard the HMS Vestal under Captain Sir William Trelawny.

=== Help from David Hume ===
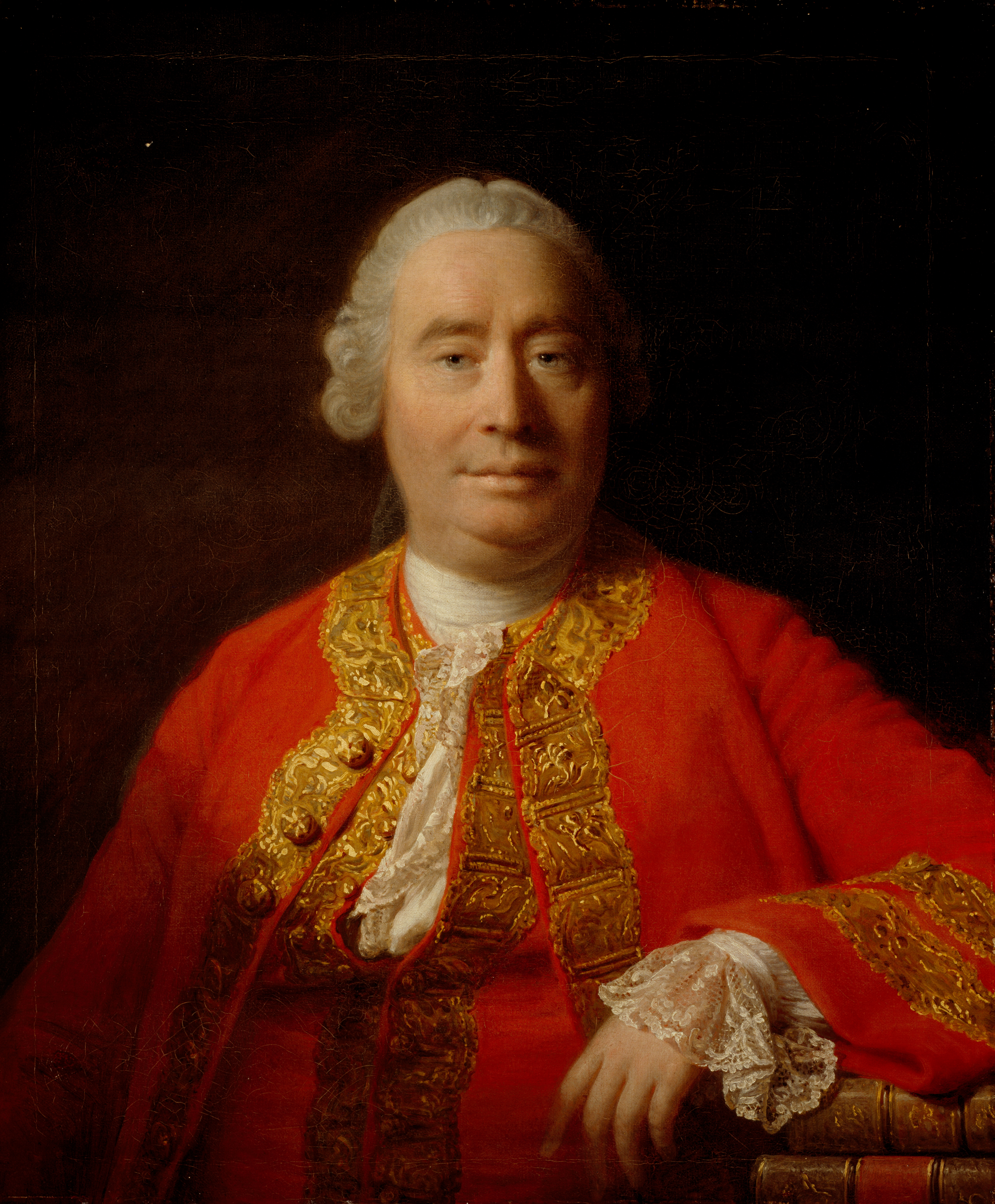
A painting of David Hume by Allan Ramsay, 1766

Edgar's family's financial ruin and lack of political influence led to him having to advance his career through his connections to the Enlightenment philosopher David Hume. Hume was cousins with Alexander Edgar and would use his social and political influence to help promote Edgar to lieutenant. Hume would write several letters to Gilbert Elliot, who held positions both as a "Man of Letters" and a "Lord of the Admiralty", praising Alexander as "modest, sober, frugal, and attentive," and lobbying for Alexander Edgar's military promotion. Edgar would be promoted to Lieutenant on December 27, 1757 Hume would also secure Edgars spot aboard the HMS Hussar under Captain John Elliot where he served for a brief period in late 1758.

=== Capture of Quebec ===
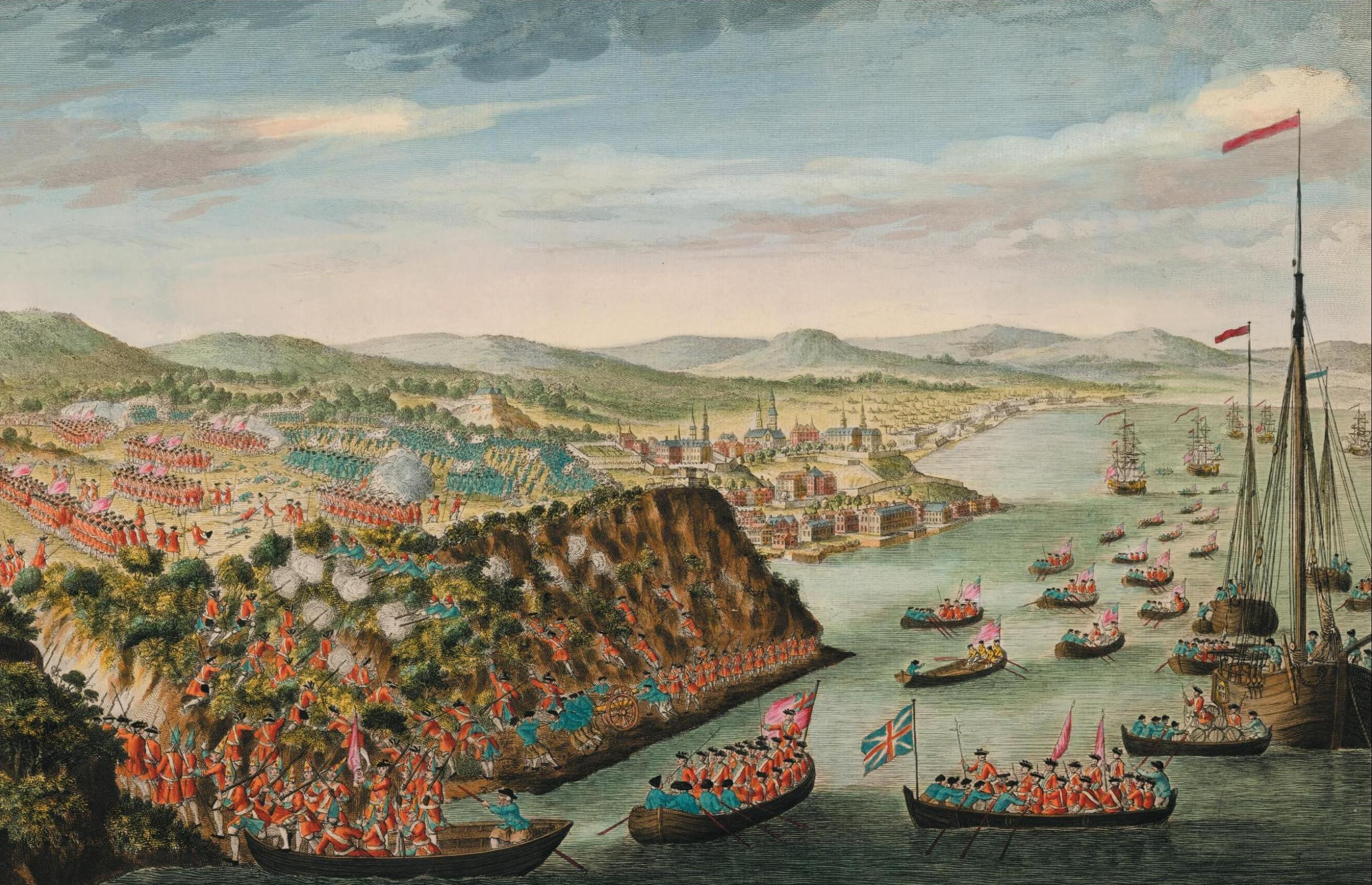
an engraving of the Capture of Quebec, 1787

Alexander Edgar would later serve as first Lieutenant aboard the HMS Vesuvius in 1759 under Commander James Chads, where he would participate in the campaign to capture Quebec. Under the overall naval command of Vice-Admiral Charles Saunders, the HMS Vesuvius was part of the massive British fleet tasked with navigating the difficult St. Lawrence River to transport and support Major-General James Wolfe's army. The ship sailed from Halifax to Cape Breton in June 1759 to gather troops before moving up the St. Lawrence River. During the summer-long siege, bomb vessels like the Vesuvius were crucial for shelling French positions and distracting the forces of the Marquis de Montcalm, helping pave the way for the decisive British victory at the Plains of Abraham in September 1759.

=== Post-War service ===
From 1761 to 1763, Edgar would serve aboard the HMS Eolus under Captain Sir William Hotham in the Caribbean and home waters. From 1765 to 1766, he served as first Lieutenant on the HMS Africa in the West Indies under captains Henry Marsh and his mentor, the Honorable John Leveson Gower. 1766 to 1771 saw him serving as first Lieutenant aboard both the HMS Eolus and the HMS Dorsetshire in the Mediterranean. Before being put on shore leave in 1772, Edgar would serve as the third Lieutenant aboard the HMS Ocean under Captains James Cranston and Joseph Knight.

== American War of Independence/Anglo-French War ==
=== Transport agent ===
As the Revolutionary war began, the British prepared to mobilize troops to be sent over to the Americas. Edgar spent a brief period working as a transport agent, tasked with preparing and shipping of several thousand British troops over to North America. Edgar oversaw the departure of the main fleet of around 8000 British troops and additionally oversaw the distribution of 200 Hanoverian recruits.

In March 1776, Edgar would serve as second Lieutenant on the HMS Princess Amelia under Captain Digby Dent. The Princess Amelia was part of the Channel Fleet, participating in blockading the English Channel and home defense.

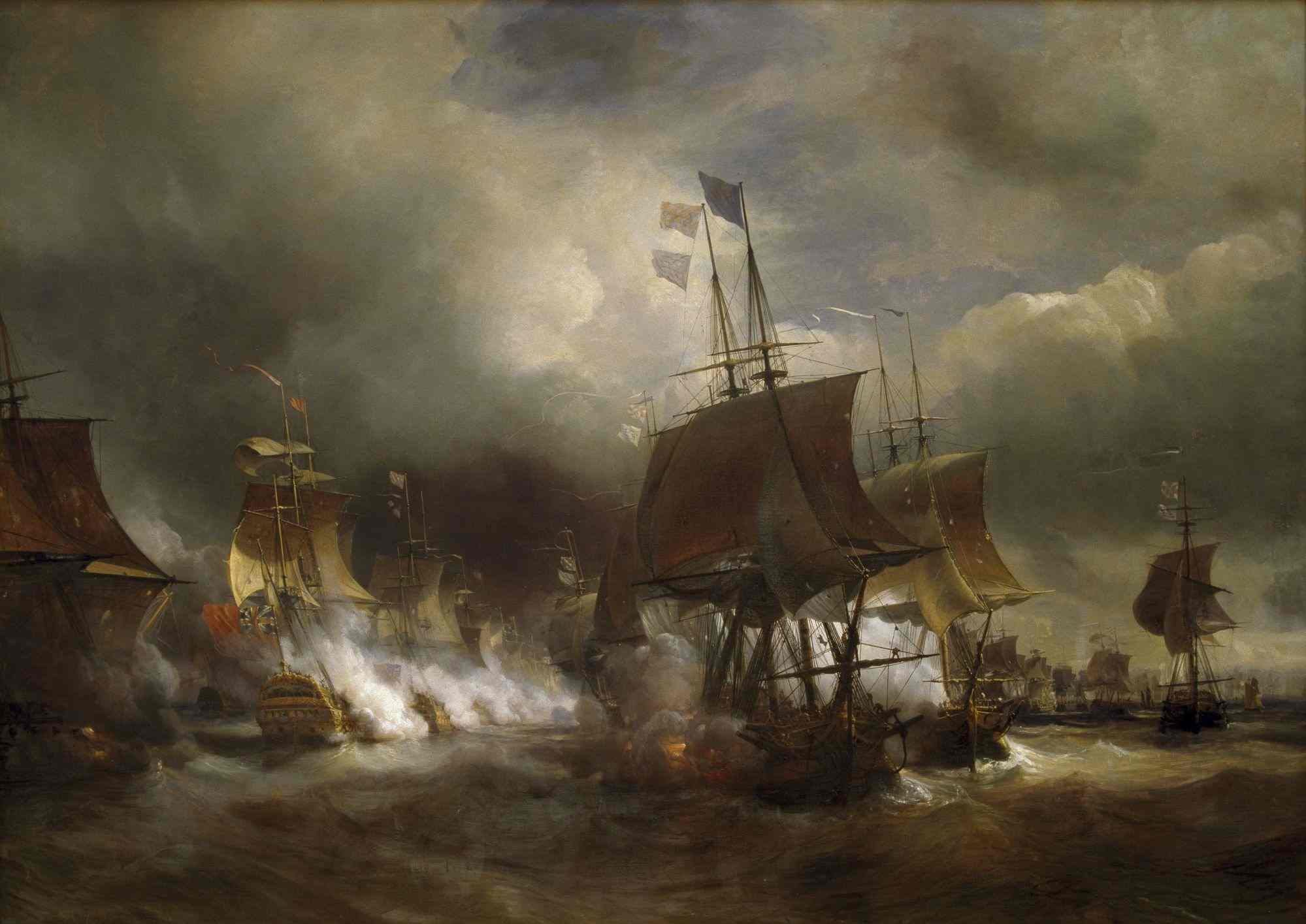
Painting of the Battle of Ushant by Théodore Gudin, 1778

=== Battle of Ushant ===
Edgar would continue to serve on the Princess Amelia until 1778, when he would become second Lieutenant aboard the HMS Victory under Admiral Augustus Keppel. While aboard the Victory, Edgar would participate in the First Battle of Ushant. Edgar would command the lower gun deck, consisting of roughly 400 men and 30 42-pounder cast iron cannons. During this conflict, Keppel would hold his fire, allowing 6 French warships to fire upon the Victory until he could directly engage the French flagship Bretagne in a fierce duel, after which he would engage the next 6 ships in the line. While the Victory inflicted heavy damage on the French, the enemy's tactic of shooting at the British rigging left Victory and much of the fleet with shredded sails and disabled masts. When Keppel tried to reform his line to renew the attack, his politically hostile third-in-command, Sir Hugh Palliser, failed to follow the orders, allowing the French fleet to slip away undetected under the cover of darkness.

=== Defense of New York and the Hard Winter of 1780 ===
Edgar would be promoted to commander on August 17, 1778, and appointed the Fireship HMS Vulcan. The HMS Vulcan was a part of Admiral Keppels Channel fleet and would participate in a brief cruise to protect incoming British merchant convoys from French privateers. By May 1779, the Vulcan would sail to Torbay to join Admiral Arbuthnots fleet. From Torbay, they would sail to North America, arriving in New York by August 1779. Edgar participated in the naval defense of New York and Rhode Island against the French fleet under Admiral d'Estaing.

Later on, Edgar experienced The Hard Winter of 1780, where the entire harbor and surrounding waterways froze solid, with ice up to 11 feet thick. Edgar, alongside Captains Jaleel Brenton, Samuel Osborne, John Plummer Ardesoif, and Peter Aplin, commanded by Captain Tyringham Howe, participated in the land-based defense of New York Harbor. Their ships were stuck in the ice and could not sail. These officers volunteered themselves and their crews to serve on land to defend the city. They were put in charge of a circular redoubt near the East River. This redoubt was armed with eight 12-pounder cannons and nine 9-pounder cannons. The position was named the "Royal Navy Redoubt" in their honor. Edgar would later command the HMS Strombolo for a brief period before it was eventually hulked and turned into a prison ship. After this Edgar would return to his command aboard the Vulcan, where he would intercept an Irish merchant ship, the Helena and Mary.

=== Promotion to Post-Captain and dispatch mission ===
By November 30, 1780, Admiral Arbuthnot would promote Alexander Edgar to Post-captain. Edgar would spend a brief period on half-pay aboard Arbuthnots flagship the HMS Royal Oak. While aboard the Royal Oak, they Intercepted 14 vessels, totaling well over 1500 tons of captured cargo. By January 1781, Arbuthnot would issue Edgar the command of the HMS Clinton. Arbuthnot chose Alexander Edgar to carry the urgent dispatches of the loss report for the HMS Culloden and a court-martial report back to London. Edgar was additionally tasked to sail his ship alongside the HMS Brilliant, acting as an armed escort for a fleet of 200 transport vessels, which were carrying loyalist and British officials that were leaving the colonies as the war turned against them.

Alexander Edgar would arrive in March of 1781, and later in March he would join the crew of the HMS Ocean as Acting Captain. As Captain George Ourrys health began to decline during late 1780 to 1781, the Admirality decided to allow Edgar to serve as the Acting Captain while Ourry would recover in his cabin.

=== Second Relief of Gibraltar ===
From March 13 to May 1781, Edgar would participate in the Second Relief of Gibraltar, a mission under Admiral George Darby which saw him successfully lead a British fleet to resupply and reinforce Gibraltar, a British garrison that had been enduring a Spanish and French siege for 2 years at this point. As part of Vice-Admiral George Darby's fleet, the HMS Ocean raised anchor and sailed from St. Helens on March 13. The armada consisted of 29 ships of the line escorting a convoy of roughly 100 merchant vessels. After nearly a month of steady sailing southward while shielding the vulnerable merchantmen, HMS Ocean and the fleet officially entered the Strait of Gibraltar. The fleet had also successfully evaded French interception. On April 12th, the leading edge of the supply convoy successfully dropped anchor off Gibraltar's New Mole. Recognizing that the fortress was being saved, Spanish shore batteries opened a furious, relentless bombardment. HMS Ocean and the heavy ships of the line formed a formidable defensive line at the mouth of the bay, deterring the Spanish fleet at Cádiz from intervening.

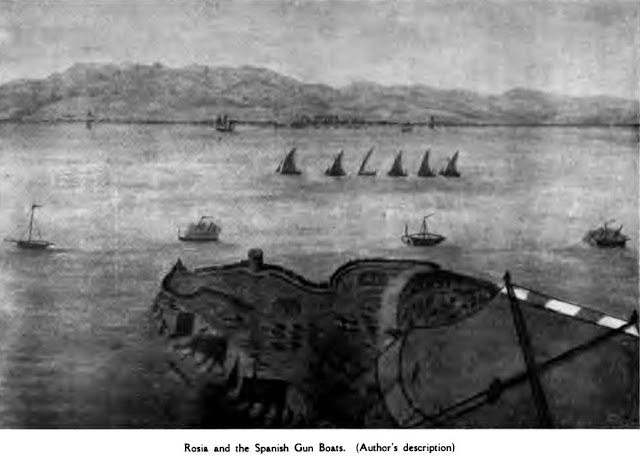
Sketch of Spanish gunboats off Rosia Bay, Gibraltar

From April 13 to April 19, the Spanish continued their relentless bombardment, with over 100 heavy mortars and cannons firing relentlessly on the bay. The Spanish also deployed a swarm of small, highly maneuverable gunboats. Under the cover of darkness and light winds, these gunboats darted out to fire heavy cannonballs and incendiary shells at the anchored British ships. While Spanish gunboats harassed the perimeter, the crew of the Ocean assisted in guarding the bay as lines of rowboats and transports offloaded immense stores of food, gunpowder, and reinforcements to the starving garrison. It was a grueling, tense standoff where the crew faced constant artillery fire, defensive skirmishing, and frequent night battles with the Gunboats. When the replenishment of Gibraltar completely finished and the wind shifting to the east, the men-of-war began maneuvering back out of the bay under parting fire from Spanish gunboats.

=== Channel Fleet Campaign ===
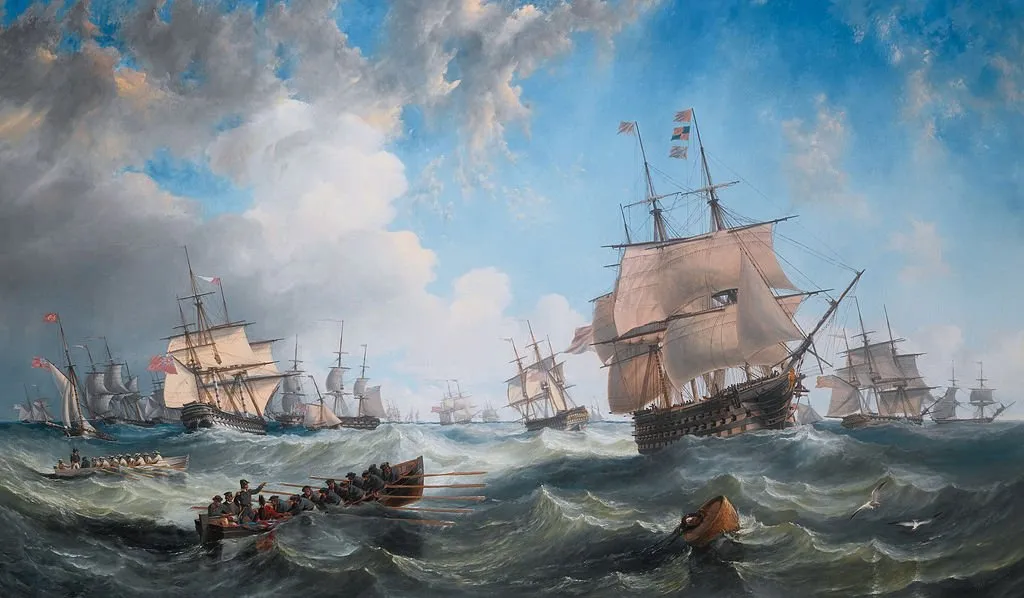
The Channel fleet in heavy weather by John Wilson Carmichael, 1847

By mid-May 1781, the fleet arrived back in home waters. HMS Ocean was immediate reassigned to routine Channel Fleet patrols, keeping the French fleet bottled up in Brest and securing the English coast for the rest of the summer. From June till December 1781, Edgar would participate in the Channel Fleet Campaign, a strategic effort by the British Royal Navy to secure the English Channel against a combined Franco-Spanish fleet.

On June 20, 1781, Orders were sent to Plymouth for the HMS Ocean and several other ships of the line to be ready to sail on the first notice to join the main fleet and protect the English Channel against the combined French and Spanish forces. The fleet was stationed to the Southward of Brest Harbour. By sitting off the coast of Brest, the British fleet was positioned specifically to prevent the French and Spanish fleets from joining forces. A sailor aboard the HMS Ocean noted that this position was so effective that the enemy fleets could not have met "without a Battle". The HMS Ocean would return to the Plymouth Sound in early July, and in late July would sail on a cruise with the Grand Fleet under Admiral Darby, alongside major vessels from the British fleet, such as the Victory, Britannia, and Royal George, along with 28 other ships of the line, to engage the French fleet.

By August, the HMS Ocean anchored at Torbay with Admiral Darbys fleet. When the Combined French and Spanish Fleet entered the Channel, Admiral Darby took a defensive position at Torbay. They anchored the fleet in a line to act as a floating fortress, daring the French and Spanish to attack them under the cover of shore batteries. By late September, the grand fleet had left Torbay and sailed westward, passing Falmouth. From September to October, the HMS Ocean and the rest of Admiral Darbys fleet suffered a massive outbreak of scurvy and was battered by storms. The campaign officially ended on November 5th when the fleet anchored at Spithead.

While in port, exhausted from the Channel fleet Campaign and Scurvy Crisis, Edgar and the other captains received urgent intelligence that a massive French convoy was gathering at Brest, loaded with thousands of troops and vast supplies intended to finish off the British in the West Indies and America. The Admiralty realized they couldn't send the whole fleet, so they formed a squadron of 12 ships of the line under Rear-Admiral Richard Kempenfelt, including Edgar and the HMS Ocean as the heavy hitter of the squadron. In December of 1781, Edgar and the HMS Ocean, alongside Admiral Kempenfelt's fleet, weighed anchor and sailed into the teeth of a winter storm. For ten days, the fleet battled severe storms in the Bay of Biscay.

Edgar and the HMS Oceans journey would be briefly halted at the start. On December 5th, Edgar participated in a rescue operation off the coast of the Eddystone, a lighthouse near Plymouth. Edgar saw the Clarendon, a merchant ship coming from Jamaica, the ship had endured a storm, lacking provisions and supplies. Crucially, the ship was leaking so badly that the crew had to pump water out constantly, and they only had four healthy men fit for duty. Captain Edgar sent five of his own men to help the Clarendon and supplied them with as many provisions as he could spare, later towing them to shore.

=== The Second Battle of Ushant ===
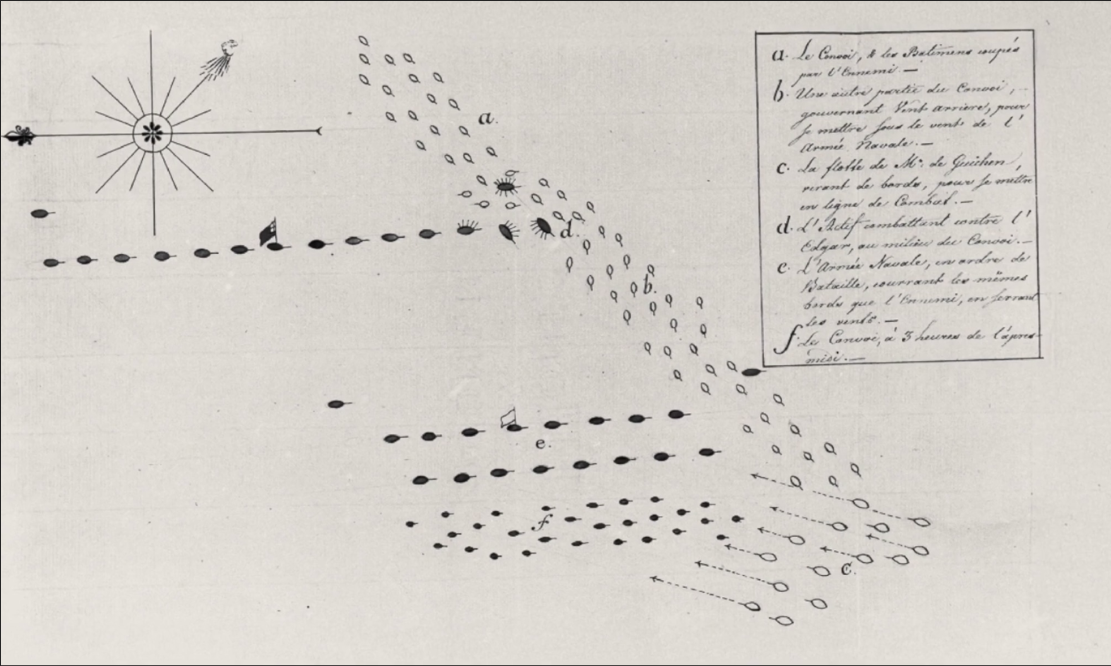
A depiction of the Second Battle of Ushant by Georg Carl von Döbeln

Edgar would participate in Second Battle of Ushant on December 12th, 1781, where the British fleet of 12 ships of the line intercepted a larger French convoy escorted by 19 ships of the line under Luc Urbain de Bouëxic, Comte de Guichen. The French convoy was transporting vital troops and military supplies to the West and East Indies. Despite being significantly outnumbered in warships, Admiral Kempenfelt was able to capitalize on a tactical error by the French commander, who had allowed his escort ships to drift well ahead of the transport vessels.

Taking advantage of the gap, the British fleet sailed towards the unprotected convoy. The British successfully captured 21 French transport ships carrying 1,620 soldiers and valuable military stores, while forcing the remainder of the convoy to scatter and retreat. De Guichen's warships could only watch helplessly from a distance, unable to intervene due to the unfavorable wind conditions. This decisive British victory severely disrupted French military plans in the Americas. Edgar and the HMS Ocean held up the rear of the British squadron.

=== Channel blockade and merchant escort ===
Following the Battle of Ushant, Edgar remained in command of the HMS Ocean, participating in a channel blockade. Edgar patrolled the Western Approaches to protect England from a feared French invasion during a period of intense winter storms. By January 11, 1782, Edgar took command of the HMS Medway. In early February, Edgar would sail alongside the HMS Princess Amelia. The Medway was acting as a naval escort for 26 ships from the Baltic region. The convoy was carrying essential raw materials for the British war effort, specifically hemp, iron, masts, and deals.

After completing this mission, the Medway would directly join Admiral Kempenfelt's fleet, participating in the blockading of the English Channel. On May 17, 1782, Kempenfelt's fleet, including the HMS Medway, successfully intercepted a French fleet on their way to join the Dutch in the Texel. They captured four ships of the line and drove three others ashore on the coast of Normandy, a major strategic victory that prevented the enemy fleets from combining. After this, the Medway would return to blockading the English Channel, before joining Admiral Howes fleet in June 1782.

By July 2nd, 1782, Edgar, alongside Admiral Howe's fleet, departed to protect a British merchant fleet returning from the West Indies. This convoy was carrying immense wealth in cargo, and a combined French and Spanish fleet was already at sea specifically to capture it. In later July, Howes fleet would participate in a naval blockade around Texel, a Dutch naval fortification.

Edgar was ordered in October of 1782, responsible for escorting 4 East India convoys into Plymouth from St. Helena, also bringing dispatches from Sir Edward Hughes with vital updates and accounts regarding British fleet operations in the Indian Ocean against the French. These East India convoys were "said to have as valuable cargoes as ever came to Europe". This was an integral part in helping the British economy during the American revolution, as North American and French forces targeted British trading vessels in order to damage the British economy. During his voyage, Edgar met with a ship belonging to the Jamaica fleet bound for London, which would arrive safely with his convoy.

On March 24th, 1783, the Medway arrived at Plymouth from Portsmouth. The Preliminary Articles of Peace had been signed, and the cessation of British fleets was being underway. On April 1st, 300 members of Edgar's crew engaged in a violent street riot in Plymouth. Armed with bludgeons, the crew faced off against 800 sailors from the Crown and Vengeance.

== Post-War service in Newfoundland ==
On April 18, 1783, Edgar took command of the HMS Leocadia. He would serve in Newfoundland, appointed surrogate, a naval judicial officer, by Governor John Campbell, empowering him to enforce fishery regulations, settle disputes over fishing rooms, investigate land encroachments, and oversee shipping contracts and servant wages.

He would serve there for 3 seasons from 1783 to 1785. In July 1784, the HMS Leocadia and Proselyte frigates were cruising on the Grand Banks of Newfoundland. Their mission was to "see that the French commit no encroachments on the boundaries of the fishery" according to the terms of the recent Treaty of Paris. They were also tasked with preventing unauthorized buildings or fortifications from being made by the French on the islands of Miquelon and St. Pierre.

After Edgar's first season in Newfoundland, he would be present as a sitting judge on the 1783 court-martial panel that tried Captain Evelyn Sutton. The trial took place from December 1, 1783, to December 11, 1783, aboard the HMS Princess Royal at Portsmouth.

In September 1784, Edgar was assigned to investigate a high-stakes property dispute in Renews, a small fishing town near Newfoundland, where a fishing room granted by the Crown in 1732 was being encroached upon by local claimants. Edgar's mission was to meticulously map the coastal fishing grounds and conduct a formal inquiry to determine the legal validity of ancient land grants against the rising tide of local settlement.

From July to August of 1785, Edgar participated in a mission where he conducted a systematic survey of Cape Broyle Harbour to identify and confirm vacant land suitable for new colonial grants. Working under the authority of Governor John Campbell, Edgar sought to distinguish available territory from "ships' rooms" and existing seasonal claims, effectively creating a legal framework for permanent settlement in the area. This mission was punctuated by the creation of a detailed harbor diagram, which functioned as a vital zoning document to delineate private property boundaries and public access to the shoreline. By formalizing these land allocations, Edgar provided the necessary legal security for merchants and settlers to establish permanent roots, marking a pivotal moment in the organized civil development of the Newfoundland coastline.

In late 1785, Edgar would conclude his command of the HMS Leocadia and his service in Newfoundland, being put on shore leave until 1787. In June of 1785, Edgar would serve as a member of the naval board who sat on the panel for Captain Sutton's civil lawsuit against Commodore George Johnstone.

== Dutch and Spanish Armaments ==
From September 27 to December 10, 1787, For the Dutch armament, Alexander Edgar commissioned and commanded the 98- gun HMS Prince George, preparing it to serve as the flag for Rear-Admiral William Hotham at Chatham.

=== Dutch Armament ===
The Dutch Armament of 1787 was a rapid naval mobilization by Great Britain triggered by a political crisis in the Dutch Republic. The Republic was divided between the Patriots, a democratic faction backed by France, and the Orangists, supporters of the ruling Stadtholder William V who were backed by Prussia and Britain. When the Patriots detained the Prussian king's sister, Prussia launched a ground invasion in September 1787 to restore the Stadtholder, raising fears that France would intervene and start a wider European war.

In response to the potential French threat, Britain immediately ordered a full-scale naval mobilization in October 1787, quickly preparing over 30 ships of the line. This armament was an act of diplomatic coercion designed to project overwhelming naval dominance in the English Channel and deter France from sending military aid to the Patriots. Isolated by Britain's naval posture and caught off guard by the speed of the Prussian advance, France backed down and chose not to intervene.

The crisis concluded swiftly without direct conflict between the major powers. Prussian forces successfully dismantled the Patriot movement and restored William V to power, allowing the British fleet to safely decommission by December. Edgar would again be put on shore leave until 1790.

=== Spanish Armament ===
On May 10, 1790, For the Spanish armament, Edgar commissioned and briefly commanded the 74-gun HMS Illustrious alongside his former mentor from his early career, Rear-Admiral Hon. John Leveson-Gower.

The Spanish Armament, also known as the Nootka Crisis, was a major diplomatic and naval standoff in 1790 between Great Britain and Spain over territorial claims in the Pacific Northwest. The crisis began in 1789 when Spanish naval forces seized British commercial vessels and a trading post established at Nootka Sound, a region Spain claimed by historic right, but Britain claimed by right of trade and settlement. In response, Britain ordered a massive, rapid mobilization of its royal navy in the spring of 1790 to pressure Spain into backing down and acknowledging British maritime rights.

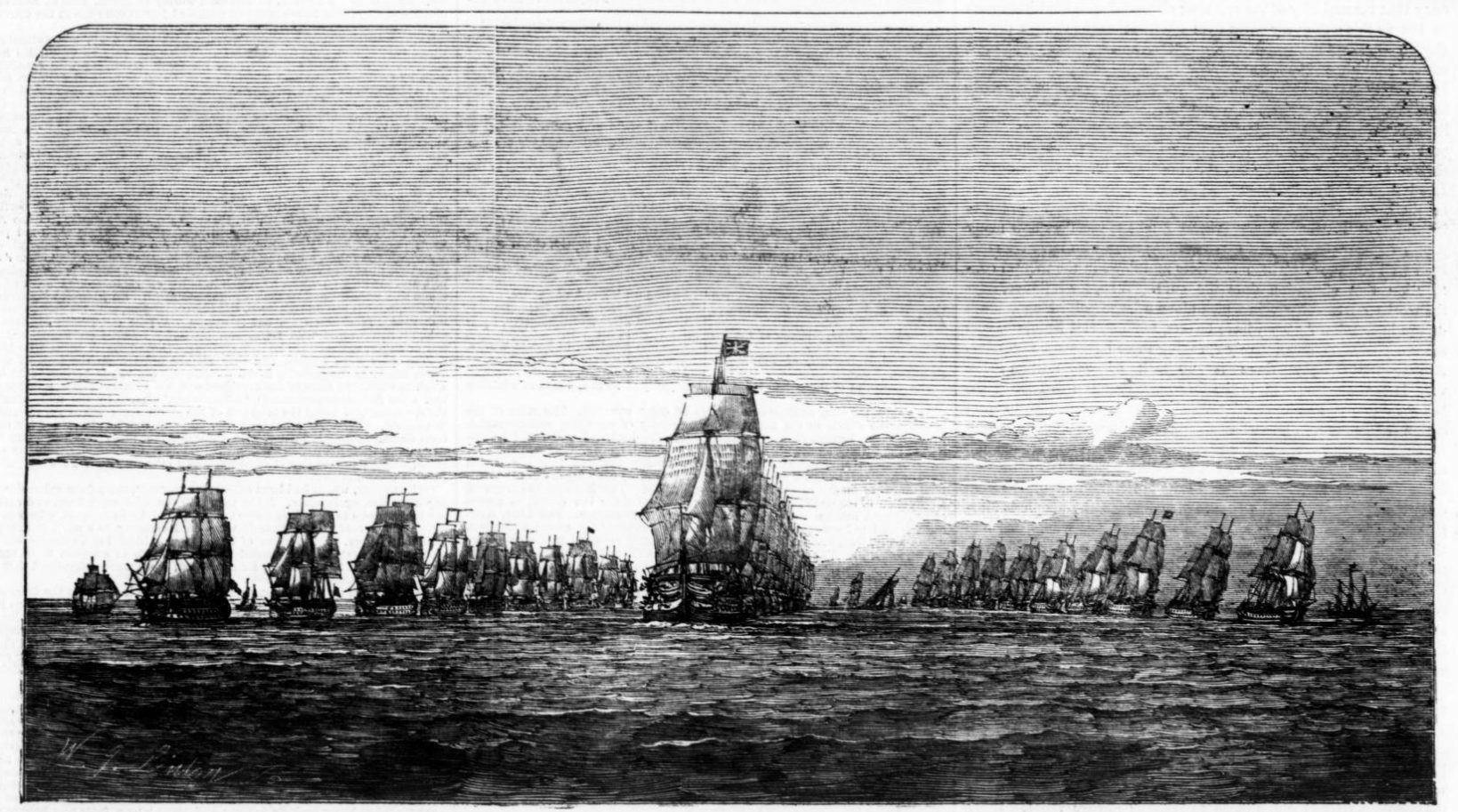
Illustration of the Channel Fleet Stationed at Torbay, 1790

The standoff brought Europe to the brink of war, Edgar sailed the HMS Illustrious to join the fleet stationed in Torbay. Edgar conducted a close-range reconnaissance mission to observe the strength and movements of the French fleet. They were closely watching France, an ally of Spain, to see if they were preparing for war. Faced with the overwhelming sight of the British fleet fully mobilized at Torbay and Spithead, Spain backed down. Furthermore, Spain's traditional ally, France, was engulfed in the early stages of the French Revolution and could not provide enough military support. Lacking allies and facing a massive British fleet, Spain signed the Nootka Conventions, agreeing to return the seized property, compensate British merchants, and yield its monopoly on trade and settlement in the Pacific Northwest.

== Later career ==
After the Spanish Armament, Edgar is put on shore leave. From 1795 to 1797, Edgar writes a series of letters to the Admirality, seeking the command of a ship of the line. As the French Revolutionary wars ramped up, Edgar wrote that he noticed the increase in enemy forces and requested to command a vessel to aid in the war effort. Though Edgar would not serve out at sea, he continued his naval career reporting key information to the British admiralty about the arrival and departure of important ships and merchant convoys.

On February 20, 1799, after a decorated 52-year long career, Alexander Edgar was promoted to the rank of Superannuated Rear-Admiral, an honorary promotion upon his retirement.

== Post career life and family ==
On January 18, 1783, Alexander Edgar married Sophia Margaret Johnstone. They would have a daughter named Sophia Batha Edgar.

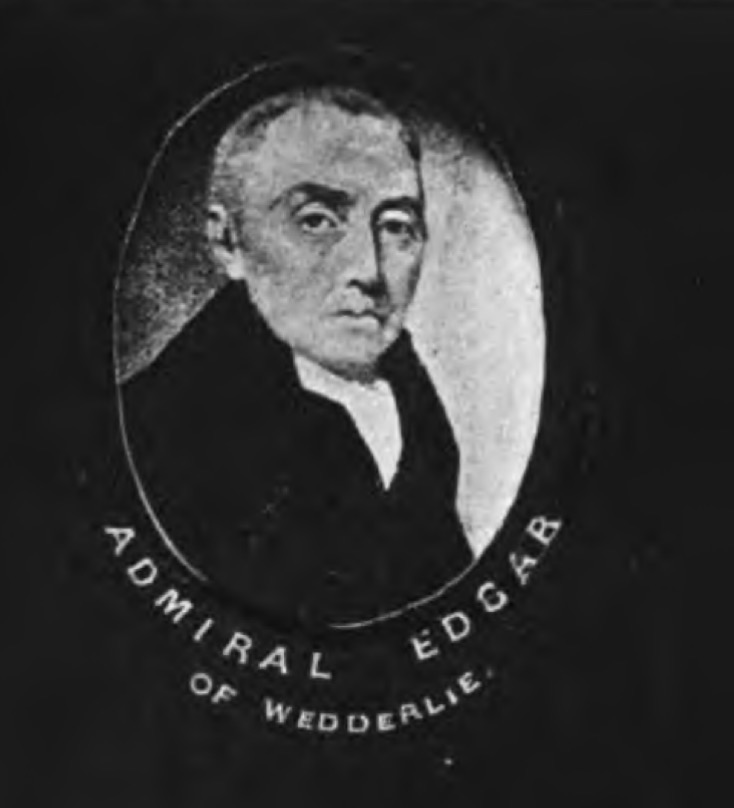
A miniature painting on ivory of Admiral Edgar, 1873

Alexander Edgar chose to settle into the maritime hub of Great Yarmouth on the Norfolk coast of England. Backed by a substantial Admiral's half-pay pension and the prize money accumulated from his decades of seizing enemy ships, Edgar lived comfortably.

Edgar's retirement years were deeply shadowed by personal tragedy and isolation. In January 1807, after twenty-four years of marriage, his wife, Sophia Margaret Johnstone, passed away from illness. Because the couple had no surviving male heirs, Edgar was aware that his direct branch of the ancient House of Wedderlie would die with him. His world narrowed to his surviving daughter, Sophia Batha Edgar. Sophia would marry Captain Robert Campbell in 1804. Campbell briefly served alongside Alexander Edgar during Edgar's command of the HMS Illustrious in 1790.

As Edgar aged into his late seventies, he left Great Yarmouth behind and relocated to Bedford Street, Bedford Square, London. Alexander Edgar died on February 17, 1817, as the last male descendant of the Edgars of Wedderlie in Berwickshire, one of the oldest families in Scotland.

In his will, Edgar left £100 to his nephew. He left £1500 to his daughter, along with liquidating all four of his estates and leaving that money, and all his belongings to her as well.
