= Lawford (disambiguation) =

Lawford is a village in Essex, England.

Lawford may also refer to:

== Places ==
- Lawford, Somerset, England, a village
- Lawford, Virginia, United States, an unincorporated community
- Lawford, West Virginia, United States, an unincorporated community
- Lawford Islands, Nunavut, Canada
- Church Lawford, Warwickshire, England
- Little Lawford, Warwickshire, England
- Long Lawford, Warwickshire, England

== People ==
- Barbara Ann Lawford (born 1942), American model and Playboy Playmate of the Month for February 1961
- Betty Lawford (1912–1960), English actress
- Christopher Lawford (1955-2018), American author, actor and activist, son of Peter Lawford
- David Christopher Lawford (born 1987), grandson of Peter Lawford
- Dean Lawford (born 1977), English former rugby league footballer
- Herbert Lawford (1851–1925), Scottish tennis player
- John Lawford (c. 1756–1842), Royal Navy admiral
- Ningali Lawford (born 1967), Australian actress
- Patricia Kennedy Lawford (1924–2006), American socialite, sister of John F., Robert, and Ted Kennedy
- Peter Lawford (1923–1984), English-born American actor
- Robin Elizabeth Lawford (born 1961), American environmentalists and marine biologists
- Sydney Turing Barlow Lawford (1865–1953), British Army lieutenant-general, father of Peter Lawford
- Trent Lawford (born 1988), Australian cricketer
- Victoria Francis Lawford (born 1958), daughter of Peter Lawford
- Lawford Davidson (1890–1964), British film actor

== Other uses ==
- HMS Lawford, two ships of the Royal Navy
- William Lawford, a fictional character in Bernard Cornwell's Sharpe novel series
- Lawford, New Hampshire, a fictional town depicted in the 1989 novel Affliction by Russell Banks
  - the novel is the basis for the 1997 film
