= Lady Taylor =

Lady Taylor may refer to:

- Ann Taylor, Baroness Taylor of Bolton (born 1947), British politician and life peer
- Lady Margaret Taylor (1840–1922), Canadian teacher and social reformer
- Sharon Taylor, Baroness Taylor of Stevenage (born 1956), British politician and life peer
- William "Lady" Taylor (1880–1942), Canadian ice hockey and lacrosse player
- Lady Taylor (ship), British ship launched 1781 and wrecked 1796

== See also ==
- Baroness Taylor (disambiguation)
- Lord Taylor (disambiguation)
