= Loyal =

Loyal may refer to:

- Loyalty

== Music ==
- Loyal (album), a 1998 album by Dave Dobbyn
  - "Loyal" (Dave Dobbyn song)
- The Loyal, a 2005 album by Tiger Lou
- "Loyal" (Chris Brown song), 2013
- "Loyal" (PartyNextDoor song), 2019
- "Loyal", a song from the album Major Lazer Essentials by Major Lazer
- "Loyal", from the album The Architect by Paloma Faith

== People ==
- Loyal (given name), a list of people
- Loyal (Lower Canada), opponents of the Patriotes during the Lower Canada Rebellion in 1837 and 1838

== Places ==
=== United States ===
- Loyal, Oklahoma, a town
- Loyal, Wisconsin, a city
- Loyal (town), Wisconsin
- Fort Loyal, a colonial refuge and outpost built in 1678 in what is now Portland, Maine

=== Scotland ===
- Ben Loyal, a mountain in Sutherland
- Loch Loyal, Sutherland

== Ships ==
- HMS Loyal, two Royal Navy destroyers
- USNS Loyal, a United States Navy ocean surveillance ship
- Ragamuffin 100, formerly Loyal, a racing yacht

== Other uses ==
- Loyal Regiment (North Lancashire), a British Army unit from 1881 to 1970
- San Diego Loyal SC, an American soccer club from 2019 to 2023
