= HMS London =

Thirteen ships of the Royal Navy have been named London, after the city of London:

- English ship London (1636) was a 40-gun East Indiaman purchased in 1636 and listed until 1653
- English ship London (1656) was a 64-gun second-rate ship launched in 1656 and blown up in an accident in 1665
- HMS Loyal London (1666) was a 96-gun second-rate ship launched in 1666: she was partly destroyed by fire by the Dutch in the Medway in 1667, but the remains were rebuilt becoming the next HMS London
- HMS London (1670) was a 96-gun first-rate ship launched in 1670 to replace the previous ship of the same name: rebuilt in 1706 and 1721, and was broken up in 1747
- HMS London (1756 brig) was a 16-gun brig launched in 1756 on Lake Ontario and captured by the French the same year
- HMS London (1756 busse) was a 6-gun Herring buss (formerly the civilian fisheries vessel Holden), purchased in 1756 from the Society for the Free British Fishery and burnt to avoid capture in 1758
- HMS London (1759) was a 6-gun busse purchased in 1759 and in the records until 1764
- HMS London (1766) was a 90-gun second rate, launched in 1766 and broken up in 1811
- HMS London was to have been a 104-gun first rate: she was renamed HMS Royal Adelaide in 1827, launched in 1828, and sold in 1905
- HMS London (1840) was a 92-gun second rate launched in 1840: converted to screw propulsion in 1858 and rearmed to 72 guns, became a harbour storeship in 1874, was re-commissioned in 1878 and sold in 1884
- HMS London (1899) was the lead ship of the London-class battleships launched in 1899, converted to a minelayer in 1918 and sold in 1920
- HMS London (69) was a County-class heavy cruiser launched in 1927 and sold in 1950
- HMS London (D16) was a County-class guided missile destroyer launched in 1961 and transferred to Pakistan in 1982, where she was renamed Babur
- HMS London (F95) was a Type 22 frigate launched in 1984, sold to Romania in 2002 and renamed Regina Maria
- HMS London (Type 26 frigate) will be the name of one of the eight Type 26 frigates

== Battle honours ==
- Kentish Knock, 1652
- Gabbard, 1653
- Scheveningen, 1653
- Lowestoft, 1665
- Sole Bay, 1672
- Schooneveld, 1673
- Texel, 1675
- Barfleur, 1692
- Chesapeake, 1781
- Groix, 1795
- Copenhagen, 1801
- Marengo, 1806
- Crimea, 1854−55
- Dardanelles, 1915
- Atlantic, 1941
- Arctic, 1941−43
- East Indies, 1944−45
- Kuwait, 1991

== See also ==
- HMS Londonderry
- HM Hired armed ship London Packet
- London (ship)
