= Leamington =

Leamington may refer to:

== Places ==
- Leamington Spa, Warwickshire, England
- Leamington Hastings, Warwickshire, England
- Leamington, Ontario, Canada
- Leamington, Utah, US
- Leamington, Cambridge, a suburb of Cambridge, New Zealand

== Other uses ==
- HMS Leamington, two Royal Navy vessels
- Leamington (horse), a 19th-century racehorse
- Leamington F.C., the Leamington Spa football club

== See also ==
- Lemington (disambiguation)
- Lymington, a town in Hampshire, England
- Lymington River, Hampshire, England
