= Leveret (disambiguation) =

Leveret may refer to:

- A young hare less than one year old
- HMS Leveret, a name given to several ships of the Royal Navy
- Leveret, an English folk group comprising Andy Cutting, Sam Sweeney and Rob Harbron
- Tu Er Shen or The Leveret Spirit, a Chinese deity
