= Jonquil =

Jonquil or Jonquille may refer to:

- Narcissus jonquilla, the jonquil, a narcissus with clusters of small fragrant yellow flowers and cylindrical leaves, native to southern Europe and northeastern Africa
- Jonquil (color), a hue named after the flower
- USS Jonquil, a 19th-century warship of the United States Navy
- HMS Jonquil, two former warships of the Royal Navy

== See also ==
- Jonquel Jones (born 1994), Bahamian-Bosnian professional basketball player
