= HMS Hindostan (1841) =

Ship of the line of the Royal Navy

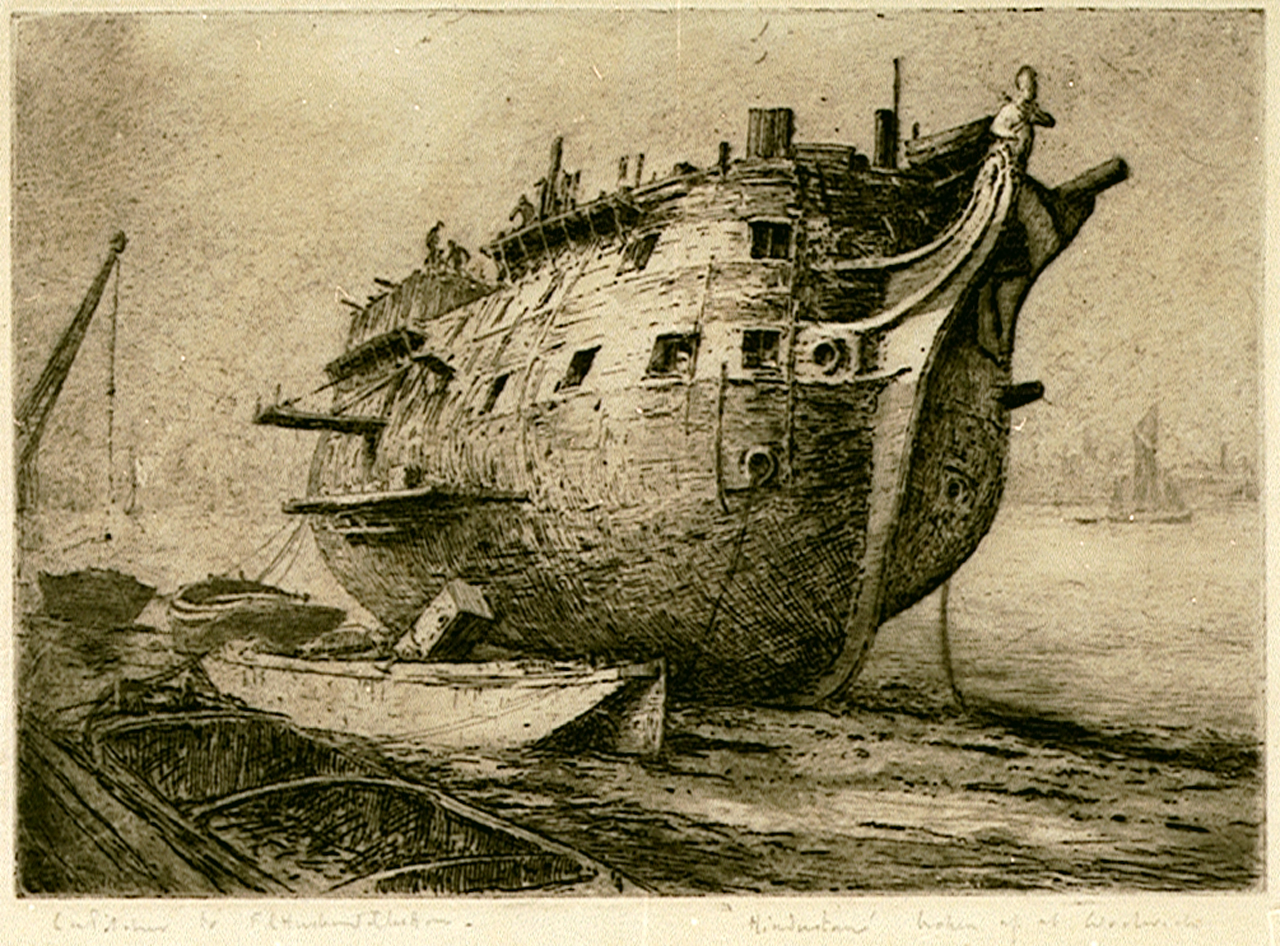
- Hindostan at Woolwich for breaking

History

United Kingdom
- Name: HMS Hindostan
- Ordered: 21 September 1819
- Builder: Plymouth Dockyard
- Laid down: August 1828
- Launched: 2 August 1841
- Fate: Sold, 1921

General characteristics
- Class & type: 80-gun second rate ship of the line
- Tons burthen: 2029 bm
- Length: 185 ft 8 in (56.59 m) (gundeck)
- Beam: 50 ft 9 in (15.47 m)
- Depth of hold: 21 ft (6.4 m)
- Propulsion: Sails
- Sail plan: Full-rigged ship
- Armament: 80 guns: Gundeck: 28 × 32 pdrs, 2 × 68 pdr carronades; Upper gundeck: 32 × 24 pdrs; Quarterdeck: 4 × 12 pdrs, 10 × 32 pdr carronades; Forecastle: 2 × 12 pdrs, 2 × 32 pdr carronades
- Notes: The name of the ship is HINDOSTAN and not HINDUSTAN which is the spelling of later vessels.

HMS Hindostan was an 80-gun two-deck second rate ship of the line of the Royal Navy, launched on 2 August 1841. Her design was based on an enlarged version of the lines of Repulse.

In 1865 she became an auxiliary to the training ship Britannia at Dartmouth, and remained part of that establishment until it was transferred ashore to the Royal Naval College there. She joined the boy artificers' training establishment at Portsmouth that year and was renamed Fisgard III. She was renamed Hindostan in 1920, and sold to J. B. Garnham & Sons in 1921. After being broken up, her timbers and those of HMS Impregnable were used in 1924 in the renovation of the Liberty department store in London.
