= Immortalité =

Immortalité is the French word for immortality or eternal life, the concept of living in a physical or spiritual form for an infinite length of time.

Immortalité may also refer to:

- French frigate Immortalité (1795), a French Navy frigate placed in service in 1795 and captured by the British in 1798
- HMS Immortalité, the name of various ships of the British Royal Navy
