= T29 =

T29 may refer to:

- Convair T-29 Flying Classroom, an American trainer aircraft
- Fuminosato Station, in Abeno-ku, Osaka, Japan
- German torpedo boat T29
- HMT Laurel (T 29), a minesweeper of the Royal Navy
- Junkers T 29, a German experimental trainer aircraft
- T29 Heavy Tank, an American heavy tank project
