= Llywelyn (disambiguation) =

Llywelyn is a given name and surname of Welsh origin. See also Llywelyn (name).

Llywelyn may also refer to:

== Places ==
- Llewellyn, Tasmania, Australia, a village
- Llewellyn, Pennsylvania, United States, an unincorporated community

== Other uses ==
- Llewellyn Formation, Pennsylvania, United States, a geologic formation
- Llewellyn baronets, two titles in the Baronetage of the United Kingdom, one extant
- Llewellyn Worldwide, a New Age and Occult publishing house
- Llewellin Setter, a field dog bred from the English Setter by Englishman R. Purcell Llewellin (1840–1925)
- HMS Llewellyn, two ships of the Royal Navy
- the title character of Lloyd Llewellyn, comic book series by Daniel Clowes
- "Llewellyn", a song on the album Marin County Line by New Riders Of The Purple Sage

== See also ==
- Carnedd Llewelyn, a mountain in Snowdonia, North Wales
- Llywelyn's coronet, crown seized by Edward I in 1284
- Lewellen, Nebraska, a village
