= HMS Laurel =

Ten ships of the Royal Navy have borne the name HMS Laurel. Another was planned but never completed. The first British ship of the name served in the Commonwealth navy. All were named after the plant family Lauraceae.

- English ship Laurel (1651) was a 50-gun ship launched in 1651 and wrecked in 1657.
- HMS Laurel (1759) was a 12-gun sloop, formerly the privateer Beckford. She was purchased in 1759 and sold in 1763.
- HMS Laurel (1763) was a 10-gun cutter purchased in 1763 and sold in 1771.
- HMS Laurel (1779) was a 28-gun sixth-rate frigate launched in 1779. She foundered in 1780.
- HMS Laurel was to have been a 28-gun sixth-rate frigate, but the order for her was canceled in 1783 after her builder went bankrupt.
- HMS Laurel was a 22-gun post ship, formerly the French corvette Jean Bart. She was captured in 1795 and sold in 1797 at Jamaica.
- HMS Laurel was the Dutch Sireene, launched in 1786, captured in 1796 at the capitulation of Saldanha Bay and brought into service as the 24-gun post ship HMS Daphne. She was converted to a prison ship in 1798 and renamed HMS Laurel; she was sold in 1821.
- HMS Laurel (1806) was a 22-gun post ship launched in 1806 and captured in 1808 by the French, who took her into service as Laurel but then sold her to commercial owners who renamed her Esperance. The British recaptured her in 1810, and renamed her HMS Laurestinus; she was wrecked in 1813.
- HMS Laurel (1809) was a 36-gun fifth-rate frigate, formerly the French Fidèle. She was captured on the stocks at Flushing (Vlissingen), Netherlands in 1809, and was wrecked in 1812.
- HMS Laurel (1813) was a 38-gun fifth-rate frigate launched in 1813. She was used for harbour service from 1864 and was broken up in 1885.
- HMS Laurel (1913) was a Laforey-class destroyer launched in 1913 as HMS Redgauntlet, but renamed shortly after. She was sold in 1921.
- HMT Laurel (T 29) was a trawler launched in 1930, acquired by the Admiralty in 1935 and converted to a minesweeper. She served throughout World War II before being sold in 1946. After many years of commercial service she was scrapped in 1955.
