= Lizard (ship) =

Several vessels have been named Lizard:

- Lizard (1797 ship), a smack of 71 tons (bm), was launched at Berwick . She sailed between Leith and Inverness for the Inverness & Leith Shipping Co. She was last listed, with minimal data, in 1836.
- Lizard (1814 ship) was a United States privateer schooner commissioned at Salem on 19 February 1814. HMS Prometheus captured Lizard on 5 March.

== See also ==
- HMS Lizard – any one of 13 vessels or shore establishments of the English or British Royal Navy
