= Insolent =

Insolent may refer to:

- HMS Insolent, the name of several ships
- Insolent (album), by RK, 2018
