= Lemington (disambiguation) =

Lemington is a district of Newcastle upon Tyne in England.

Lemington may also refer to:

- Lemington, New South Wales, in Singleton, Australia
- Lemington, Vermont, a town in the United States
- Lemington, Wisconsin, an unincorporated community in the United States
- Lemington, Pittsburgh, Pennsylvania; part of Lincoln–Lemington–Belmar, United States
- Lemington, a village in Gloucestershire, England, now known as Lower Lemington

== See also ==
- Leamington (disambiguation)
