= London (ship) =

Several ships have been named London for the city of London:

- HMS London (1660), exploded accidentally in the Thames estuary and now a protected wreck.
- London (1784 ship) was a British merchant vessel launched in 1764 at Shoreham, probably as Polly. She was renamed Irwin, and then Weir, and in 1784 London. She was wrecked on 9 October 1796.
- London (1779 EIC ship) was launched in London as an East Indiaman. She made seven voyages for the British East India Company (EIC), between 1780 and 1798. She was sold for breaking up in 1799.
- London (1788 ship), of 262 or 275 tons (bm), was launched at Hull in 1788. She made four voyages as a whaler in the British southern whale fishery. She then made two voyages from Bristol to Africa and back, the first for the Sierra Leone Company. Thereafter, she became a West Indiaman. She was last listed in 1807.
- London (1832 ship) initially carried passengers to India. From 1840 she made two voyages from England carrying immigrants to New Zealand for the New Zealand Company. She also made two voyages transporting convicts from the United Kingdom to Tasmania. She then became a transport for several years before returning to trading between Newcastle and Spain. She ran into a barque in 1866 with the result that the barque's crew had to abandon their vessel. London was last listed in 1869.
- SS London (1864), a steamship sunk in 1866

== See also ==
- HMS London, any one of 13 ships of the British Royal Navy
