= HMS Loyal =

Two ships of the Royal Navy have borne the name HMS Loyal:

- HMS Loyal (1913) was a Laforey-class destroyer, originally built as HMS Orlando, but renamed before being launched in 1913. She was sold in 1921.
- HMS Loyal (G15) was an L-class destroyer launched in 1941 and sold in 1948.

== Other ships ==
A number of ships of the Royal Navy have used 'Loyal' as part of their name, including:

- HMS Loyal Example, entered service as HMS Example
- HMS Loyal Exploit, entered service as HMS Exploit
- HMS Loyal Explorer, entered service as HMS Explorer
- HMS Loyal Express, entered service as HMS Express
- HMS Loyal London

== See also ==
- HMS Loyalist
- HMS Loyalty
