= HMS Lofoten =

1945 tank landing ship

History

United Kingdom
- Name: Lofoten
- Laid down: 30 May 1944
- Launched: 21 January 1945
- Commissioned: 24 October 1945
- Decommissioned: 1967
- Fate: Scrapped 1993

General characteristics
- Type: Landing Ship, Tank
- Displacement: 4,820 tons
- Length: 105 m (344 ft)
- Beam: 17 m (56 ft)
- Draught: 2 m (7 ft)
- Speed: 12.5 knots (23.2 km/h)
- Complement: 110
- Aircraft carried: Space for up to 6 helicopters on deck

HMS Lofoten was a vessel of the Royal Navy. Initially built as one of a large number of LSTs in 1945, she was named after the Norwegian islands that were raided during Operation Claymore in 1941. She saw little service before being laid up in reserve.

During the Suez Crisis, she was used to land the transport for 45 Commando which was part of the first-ever operational helicopter assault. In 1964, she was converted into a dedicated helicopter training ship; this involved converting the deck in front of the superstructure into a landing platform. There was no hangar and minimal support facilities – the ship was essentially a platform for practising landings at sea, and a deck to transport helicopters on. In 1967, the Lofoten was replaced in this role by the purpose built RFA Engadine.

Lofoten was again laid up in 1969 to be used as an accommodation ship and as a support vessel, being docked alongside nuclear submarines undergoing refit at Rosyth Royal Dockyard (at least from 1981 onwards), before finally being sold for scrapping in 1993. At that time, another LST, HMS Stalker, was also used as a support vessel for nuclear submarine refits at Rosyth, being undertaken in the second of the two nuclear qualified docks.

== Bibliography ==
- Preston, Antony (1995). "United Kingdom". In Chumbley, Stephen (ed.). Conway's All The World's Fighting Ships 1947–1995. Annapolis, Maryland: Naval Institute Press. pp. 95–131. ISBN 1-55750-132-7.
