= HMS Legion =

Two destroyers of the British Royal Navy have been named HMS Legion, after the Roman legion.

- The first, HMS Legion (1914), was launched in 1914 and sold in 1921.
- The second, HMS Legion (G74), was launched in 1939 and sunk in an air attack off Malta in 1942.
