= HMS Infernal =

Four vessels of the Royal Navy have borne the name HMS Infernal:

- HMS Infernal (1757) was an 8-gun bomb vessel, built in West Northam in 1757 and sold in 1774.
- HMS Infernal (1778) was a 6-gun fireship, constructed on the River Thames in 1778 and sold out of service in 1783.
- HMS Infernal (1815) was a 6-gun bomb vessel, built in 1815 and sold out of service in 1831.
- HMS Infernal (1843) was a 6-gun paddle sloop built in 1843, renamed Eclair in 1844 and Rosamund in 1846. She was converted to a floating factory in 1863 and broken up two years later.
