= HMS Inverness =

Two ships of the Royal Navy have borne the name HMS Inverness:

- HMS Inverness (1746) was previously the French privateer Duc de Chartres captured in 1746. She was broken up in 1750
- HMS Inverness (M102) was a Sandown-class minehunter launched in 1990 and sold to the Estonian Navy in 2006 who renamed her EML Sakala
