= HMS Ivy =

Three ships of the British Royal Navy have been named HMS Ivy named after the plant.

- The first Ivy was an Acacia-class sloop sloop but renamed Marigold before her launch in 1915.
- The second HMS Ivy (1917) was an Anchusa-class sloop launched in 1917 and sold in 1920.
- A third Ivy was a Flower-class corvette with pennant number K204 ordered from Harland & Wolff on 8 April 1940 but cancelled on 23 January 1941.
