= HMS Lydiard =

Two ships of the Royal Navy have been named HMS Lydiard

- HMS Lydiard (1914), was a Laforey-class destroyer that served in World War I.
- Lydiard (FY177), launched in 1935, was a 440-ton trawler purchased by the Admiralty in September 1939 and converted for anti-submarine warfare. She served in World War II and was sold in 1946.
