= HMS Lee =

Six ships of the Royal Navy have borne the name HMS Lee:

- HMS Lee (1776) was an 8-gun sloop serving on the Canadian Lakes in 1776.
- HMS Lee (1780) was an 8-gun galley, previously named Adder, purchased in 1780 and sold in 1784.
- HMS Lee (1814) was a 20-gun sixth rate launched in 1814 and broken up in 1822.
- HMS Lee (1857) was a wooden screw gunboat launched in 1857 and sunk in action in 1859.
- HMS Lee (1860) was a Philomel-class wooden screw gunvessel launched in 1860 and broken up in 1875.
- HMS Lee (1899) was a destroyer launched in 1899, classified as a C-class destroyer in 1913 and wrecked in 1909.
