= HMS Lyme Regis =

HMS Lyme Regis may refer to the following ships of the Royal Navy:

- HMS Lyme Regis (J193), a Bangor-class minesweeper
- HMS Lyme Regis (J197), a Bangor-class minesweeper, transferred to Royal Indian Navy as HMIS Rajputana (J197)

== See also ==
- Lyme Regis
