= Lord Mulgrave (ship) =

1783 armed ship

History

Great Britain
- Name: Lord Mulgrave
- Namesake: Lord Mulgrave
- Builder: Whitby
- Launched: 1783
- Fate: Wrecked April 1799

General characteristics
- Tons burthen: 421, or 429, or 500, or 600 (bm)
- Armament: 20 × 6-pounder guns + 8 swivel guns

Lord Mulgrave was launched at Whitby in 1783. She had a mercantile career until 1793 when the Admiralty hired her to serve as an armed ship protecting convoys. She was wrecked in 1799.

== Mercantile career ==
Lord Mulgrave first appeared in Lloyd's Register in 1783 with Easterby, master, J. Addison, owner, and traded Whitby–Riga. (Note: John Addison may have owned a previous Lord Mulgrave, launched in 1780-1 and "taken by the enemy". The Weatherill book does not mention the 1783 Lord Mulgrave.)

Year	Master	Owner	Trade	Notes and source
1786	Skinner; R. Chettin	J. Addison	Norway–London; Cork-based transport	Lloyd's Register
1790	H. Chilton; Joseph Smith	J. Addison	Saint Petersburg−London	Lloyd's Register
1793	J. Smith	F. Easterby	Cork transport	Lloyd's Register

In September 1786 Lord Mulgrave, Chilton, master, arrived at Dover from Halifax, Nova Scotia, with the 33rd Regiment of Foot.

Lord Mulgrave was reported to be "all well" on 13 July 1787 near Newfoundland while on her way to Quebec.

== Hired armed ship ==
The Admiralty hired Lord Mulgrave and on 13 April 1793 published her establishment (weapons and manning). The outbreak of war with France had created a requirement for a large number of smaller vessels to protect England's trade, which provided a target-rich environment for French privateers. The Admiralty responded by hiring a number of small merchantmen, and purchasing others.

Year	Commander	Station	Notes
1793	George Maxwell		Commissioned Lord Mulgrave in April
1793-95	Robert Rolles	North Sea	
1795-1797	John Smith		Died 1797
1797-98	Edward Williams	Channel	
1799	Edward Hawkins	Channel	

Under Commander Robert Rolles Lord Mulgrave convoyed vessels between Spithead and Hull. The insurance underwriters at Hull presented him with a "handsome piece of plate" for his "great care and diligent attention to their interests". On 12 August 1795 Rolles was promoted to post captain into HMS Laurel.

In March 1797 Lord Mulgrave was at Scilly with a convoy. While she was there, a violent gust of wind overturned her boat with Commander Smith on board. He and three crew members were drowned; three crew members were saved.

== Fate ==
On 9 April 1799 Commander Hawkins sailed Lord Mulgrave from Cork for Dublin. At about 4a.m. she grounded on the Arklow Bank, a shallow water sandbank in the Irish Sea, around 10 kilometres (6.2 mi) off the coast of Arklow. She started to take on water so the crew threw ballast overboard and increased the sail area to try to drive her off the Bank. They succeeded about two hours later but she was taking on so much water that Hawkins steered her for the land. In about another two hours, as water was up to main deck, she ran onto the beach near Arklow.

The Navy may have salvaged her and taken some time to decide whether to take her back into service, before deciding to dispose of her. Steele's Navy List for April 1800 still listed Lord Mulgrave among the hired armed vessels with Lieutenant Samuel Bateman in command and Joseph Smith Master; it also did not include her in the list of vessels lost. However, the official lists do not show her being recommissioned; Hawkins is the last commander listed. Nor are there any paybooks or logs after June 1799, the month of Hawkins's court martial for the loss. Lieutenant Bateman was promoted to commander in 1801 and died in 1803.
