= HMS Strombolo =

Seven ships of the Royal Navy have borne the name HMS Strombolo, or HMS Stromboli, after the volcano Stromboli, in Italy:

- HMS Strombolo (1691) was an 8-gun fireship launched in 1691, rebuilt in 1704 and sold in 1713.
- HMS Strombolo (1739) was an 8-gun fireship, formerly the civilian Mollineaux. She was purchased in 1739 and sold in 1743.
- HMS Strombolo (1756) was an 8-gun fireship, formerly the civilian Owner's Goodwill. She was purchased in 1756 and sold in 1768.
- HMS Strombolo was a fireship, launched in 1746 as the 14-gun sloop HMS Grampus. She was converted to a fireship and renamed Strombolo in 1775 and was hulked in 1780.
- HMS Strombolo (1797?) was a purchased gunboat based at Gibraltar that the Spanish sank during the action of 19 January 1799. (Note: Winfield (2008) does not mention this vessel.)
- HMS Strombolo (1797) was an 8-gun bomb vessel, launched in 1795 at North Shields as the mercantile Leander. The Royal Navy purchased her in 1797, converted her to a bomb-vessel, and renamed her. She participated in the capture of Malta in 1800. The Navy laid her up in 1802 and had her broken up in 1809.
- HMS Strombolo was a bomb vessel, formerly the 14-gun sloop HMS Autumn, the merchantman Autumn, launched at Shields in 1800 and purchased in 1801. She was converted to a bomb vessel and renamed Strombolo in 1811; she was sold in 1815. She returned to mercantile service but was lost in 1817.
- HMS Stromboli (1839) was a wooden paddle sloop launched in 1839 and sold in 1866.

== See also ==
- HCS Strombolo was a ketch launched in 1793 at the Bombay Dockyard for the Bombay Marine. She foundered on 18 September or 15 October 1809.
