= HMS Lys =

Two ships of the Royal Navy have borne the name HMS Lys:

- HMS Lys (1745), a 24-gun sixth-rate vessel, captured from the French in 1745 and sold in 1749.
- HMS Lys (1755), a 64-gun third-rate ship of the line, captured from the French in 1755, commissioned for a single trans-Atlantic voyage and sold in the same year.
