= HMS Kashmir =

HMS Kashmir, has been the name of a number of ships of the Royal Navy, from Kashmir a former part of the British Empire:

- HMS Kashmir (1915) — a troopship, formerly a P&O liner. Collided on 6 October 1918 with HMS Otranto (which sank off the west coast of Islay).
- HMS Kashmir (F12) — a K-class destroyer launched in 1939 and sunk in 1941.
