= HMS Lotus =

Two ships of the Royal Navy have borne the name HMS Lotus, after the Lotus flower:

- HMS Lotus (K93), a Flower-class corvette launched in 1942. She was lent to the Free French Navy between 1942 and 1947, and renamed Commandant d'Estienne d'Orves. She was sold for scrapping in 1947 and broken up in 1951.
- HMS Lotus (K130), a Flower-class corvette, previously named HMS Phlox, but renamed after the previous HMS Lotus was transferred. She was launched in 1942 and sold in 1947.
