= Lawford, Virginia =

Unincorporated community in Virginia, United States

- Unincorporated community
- Location within Virginia Location within the United States
- Coordinates: 37°37′00″N 78°16′37″W
- Country: United States
- State: Virginia
- County: Buckingham
- Elevation: 413 ft (126 m)
- Time zone: UTC-5 (Eastern (EST))
  - Summer (DST): UTC-4 (EDT)
- Area code: 434
- GNIS feature ID: 1477479

Lawford (also Runlack) is an unincorporated community in Buckingham County, in the U.S. state of Virginia.
