= HMS Ludlow =

Three ships of the Royal Navy have borne the name Ludlow after the town in Shropshire:

- HMS Ludlow (1698), a fifth rate launched in 1698 and captured by France in 1703.
- HMS Ludlow (1916), a Racecourse-class minesweeper launched in 1916 and lost in World War I.
- HMS Ludlow (G57), a Town-class destroyer previously USS Stockton transferred to the Royal Navy in 1940. She was expended as a target ship in 1945.
