= HMS Lizard (1697) =

Navy vessel

History

England
- Name: HMS Lizard
- Ordered: 1 July 1696
- Builder: Royal Dockyard, Sheerness
- Launched: 29 March 1697
- Commissioned: 29 March 1697
- Fate: Sold 29 July 1714

General characteristics
- Type: 20-gun Sixth Rate
- Tons burthen: 263 70/94 bm
- Length: 95 ft 0 in (29.0 m) gundeck; 79 ft 4 in (24.2 m) keel for tonnage
- Beam: 25 ft 0 in (7.6 m) for tonnage
- Depth of hold: 10 ft 10 in (3.3 m)
- Armament: initially as ordered; 20 × sakers on wooden trucks (UD); 4 × 3-pdr on wooden trucks (QD); 1703 Establishment; 20 × 6-pdrs on wooden trucks (UD); 4 × 4-pdr on wooden trucks (QD)

HMS Lizard was a member of the standardized 20-gun sixth rates built at the end of the 17th century. She was commissioned for service in the East Indies, then Mediterranean, followed by Home Waters in the Irish Sea. She was sold in 1714.

Lizard was the fifth ship to bear this name since it was used for a 120 builder's measure ship listed from 1512 to 1522.

== Construction ==
She was ordered in the Fourth Batch of four ships from Sheerness Dockyard to be built under the guidance of their Master Shipwright, Robert Shortiss. She was launched on 29 March 1697.

== Commissioned service ==
She was commissioned on 29 March 1697 under the command of Captain William Johnson, RN for service in the Channel. She was assigned to the East Indies in 1698. On the death of Captain Johnson on the 31st of August, Captain Edward Rumsey, RN took over on i September 1699. On 8 July 1700 Captain George Martin, RN took command. 1702, she was under the command of Captain Rupert Billingsley, RN followed in 1703 by Captain George Doleman, RN while serving in the Mediterranean. On 14 July 1704 she had a new commander, Captain George Fane, RN and assigned to Home Waters. In 1705 Captain Josiah Mighells, RN was in command in the Irish Sea. Captain Mighells died on 30 August 1707. In 1708 Commander Nicholas Smith, RN was in command followed by Commander Francis Cooper, RN and finally in 1710, Commander Arthur Jones, RN (promoted to captain 1 January 1713) while serving in the Irish Sea

== Disposition ==
HMS Lizard was sold on 29 March 1714.
