= HMS Inspector =

Three vessels of the Royal Navy have been named HMS Inspector.

- HMS Inspector (1782) was launched at Wivenhoe in 1782 as the only vessel built to her design. She participated in one campaign and also captured a handful of small merchant vessels before the Navy sold her in 1802. Most notably, her crew participated in the mutiny at the Nore. After her sale, she became the whaler Inspector. She made six complete voyages to the British southern whale fishery. A Chilean privateer captured her in May 1819. Eventually she was condemned as unseaworthy at Santander in 1821.
- HMS Inspector was launched in 1801 at Mistley as the mercantile Amity (1801 ship). The Royal Navy purchased her in 1803 and laid her up in 1808 before selling her in 1810. She then returned to mercantile service. Between 1818 and 1825 she made four voyages as a whaler. She returned to mercantile service and was last listed in 1833 as being at Falmouth.
- HMS Inspector was a survey vessel in 1822.
