= HMS Jewel =

Two ships of the Royal Navy have borne the name HMS Jewel :

- HMS Jewel (1809) was a 38-gun fifth rate, formerly the French frigate Topaze captured in 1809 initially named Jewel but renamed Alcmene later that year. She was broken up in 1816.
- HMS Jewel (J390) was an Algerine-class minesweeper launched in 1944 and broken up in 1967.
