= London Packet (1791 ship) =

History

Great Britain
- Name: London Packet
- Launched: 1791
- Captured: 19 May 1814

General characteristics
- Tons burthen: 183, or 189, or 191, or 200 (bm)
- Complement: 1803:22; 1805:25; 1811:14
- Armament: Hired armed ship:10 × 4-pounder guns; 1803:10 × 4-pounder guns; 1805:10 × 4-pounder guns; 1811:6 × 4-pounder guns

London Packet was a merchant vessel launched on the Thames in 1791. She served the Royal Navy as a hired armed ship from 31 March 1793, to at least 30 September 1800, and despite some records, apparently for a year or more beyond that. She then returned to sailing as a merchantman until an American privateer captured her in May 1814.

== Merchantman ==
London Packet entered Lloyd's Register (LR) in 1791.

Year	Master	Owner	Trade	Source
1791	Jn. Toone	Jn. Toone	London–Cadiz	LR
1794	Edwards	Edwards	London–Cadiz	LR

== Hired armed ship ==
London Packet was commissioned in April 1793 under Lieutenant J.E. Douglas. Then from May 1794 or so, Lieutenant James Fegan (or Fogan) was captain, with A. Hill as master, at least in 1799.

On 27 February 1795 Lloyd's List (LL) reported that the armed ship London Packet had recaptured Monmouth, Blackburn, master. Monmouth had been sailing from Jamaica to London when the French had captured her. Unfortunately, Monmouth was then lost on the rocks at the Isles of Scilly with two of her crew members being drowned.

London Packet otherwise appears to have had a relatively uneventful career on the Liverpool to Channel station, escorting convoys until at least late 1801. In October 1801 she had left Plymouth for Liverpool with 100 French prisoners. Although, or despite having heard in Falmouth of the pending peace treaty with France the prisoners attempted to take over the ship. Lieutenant Fegan and the officers were able to suppress the uprising within minutes without injury to officers or crew, but with some injuries among the prisoners. The news of the treaty had caused the British to relax their precautions and the prisoners had decided to take advantage of this.

== Merchantman ==
At the resumption of war with France in 1803 the Royal Navy did not rehire London Packet. Instead she returned to mercantile service. The Register of Shipping for 1804 showed her with J.Toone, master and owner, and trade London–Cadiz. In 1803 she took on Guernsey registry. Captain Thomas Quertis (or Quertier), acquired a letter of marque on 29 October 1803. She had a crew of 22 men, and her owners were Daniel Moullin, Abraham Simon, Hilary Boucaut. and John Brehaut. In 1804, London Packet sailed from Guernsey to New York to Guernsey to Virginia to Guernsey.

Captain Richard Rabey acquired a letter of marque on 30 April 1805. On 18 May 1805, London Packet received a pass to Newfoundland. On 25 June 1806, she received a protection for a voyage to Newfoundland. Her master was sill Richard Rabey. Daniel Moullin, Abraham Simon, Hilary Boucaut. and John Brehaut. London Packet reappeared in LR in 1807 with R.Raby, master, Moulen, owner, and trade Hull-Guernsey. On 4 April 1810, she received a protection for a voyage to Rio de Janeiro, with Thomas Domaille, master.

The Register of Shipping (RS) for 1811 showed London Packet with R. Raby, master, Moulden, owner, and trade Hull–Baltic. This entry continued unchanged through the 1813 volume. Captain Thomas Domaille acquired a letter of marque on 5 April 1811. LR for 1811 showed her trade as London–Guernsey. LR for 1813 showed her master as Raby, changing to Domville. On 13 April 1811, London Packet received a pass to Newfoundland and the Mediterranean. Between 1811 and 1814, London Packet sailed between Newfoundland and Mediterranean, with Domaille, master.

== Fate ==
An American privateer captured London Packet, of Guernsey, Domaille, master, on 19 April 1814, as she was sailing from Valencia to Rio de Janeiro. (Note: Another source gives the date of capture as 8 May 1814.) The captor may have been Chasseur. Part of her crew and of Melpomene of Guernesy, which had also been taken, landed near Faro on 21 and 23 May.
