= HMS Levant =

Two ships of the Royal Navy have borne the name HMS Levant, after the Levant, an historic name for the Eastern Mediterranean. A third was to have been renamed Levant, but this was never carried out:

- HMS Levant (1758) was a 28-gun sixth rate launched in 1758 and broken up by 1780.
- HMS Levant was to have been a 36-gun fifth rate captured from the Danes in 1807 as HMS Venus. She was to have been renamed in 1809, but instead was reduced to harbour service that year and was sold in 1815.
- HMS Levant (1813) was a 20-gun sixth rate launched in 1813. She was briefly captured in 1813, but was soon recaptured, and was broken up in 1820.
