= HMS Lizard =

Twelve ships and a shore establishment of the Royal Navy have been named Lizard after The Lizard, a peninsula in Cornwall.

== Ships ==
- English ship Lizard (1512) was a ship listed between 1512 and 1522.
- English ship Lizard (1652) was a 16-gun fireship Royalist ship captured by the Parliamentarians in 1652 and expended in 1666.
- HMS Lizard (1673) was a 4-gun sloop launched in 1673 and captured by the Dutch in 1674.
- HMS Lizard (1694) was a 24-gun sixth rate launched in 1694 and wrecked in 1696.
- HMS Lizard (1697) was a 24-gun sixth rate launched in 1697 and sold in 1714.
- HMS Lizard (1744) was a 14-gun sloop launched in 1744 and wrecked on 27 February 1747 (Some sources give 1748 but 1747 did not start on 1 January)^{[Note 1]}
- HMS Lizard (1757) was a 28-gun sixth rate launched in 1757, used for harbour service from 1795 and sold in 1828.
- HMS Lizard (1782) was the French Cerf-class cutter Lézard of eighteen 6-pounder guns, built by Jacques and Daniel Denys at Dunkirk and launched on 10 March 1781. She was captured on 2 October 1782 in the roads of the neutral (Danish) port of Tranquebar and taken to Bombay. There she was released back to France in 1783, after she had been present at the Battle of Cuddalore, and re-entered on the lists in January 1784. She was broken up in 1784.
- HMS Lizard (1840) was a wooden paddle vessel launched in 1840 and sunk in 1843 in a collision with the French paddle sloop Veloce.
- HMS Lizard (1844) was an iron paddle gunboat launched in 1844 and broken up in 1869.
- HMS Lizard (1886) was a composite screw gunvessel launched in 1886 and sold in 1905.
- HMS Lizard (1911) was an Acheron-class destroyer launched in 1911 and sold in 1921.

== Shore establishments ==
- HMS Lizard (shore establishment) was a Combined Operations Landing Craft base, at Shoreham, West Sussex, commissioned in 1942 and closed in 1945.

== Notes ==
1. Until 1752, the year began on Lady Day (25 March) Thus 24 March 1747 was followed by 25 March 1748. 31 December 1748 was followed by 1 January 1748.
