= HMS Leeds Castle =

Two ships of the Royal Navy have been named HMS Leeds Castle after Leeds Castle, near Maidstone in Kent.

- HMS Leeds Castle (K384) was a Castle-class corvette (though later on re-designated a frigate), built in 1944.
- HMS Leeds Castle (P258) is a Castle-class patrol vessel launched in 1980.

== Battle honours ==
- Atlantic 1945
- Falkland Islands 1982
