= Baroness Taylor =

Baroness Taylor may refer to:

- Ann Taylor, Baroness Taylor of Bolton (born 1947), Labour Party politician and Cabinet minister
- Sharon Taylor, Baroness Taylor of Stevenage (born 1956), Labour Party politician and county councillor

== See also ==
- Lord Taylor (disambiguation)
