= Lord Taylor =

Lord Taylor or Baron Taylor may refer to:

- Baron Isidore Justin Séverin Taylor (1789–1860), a royal commissioner of the Théâtre-Français
- Bernard Taylor, Baron Taylor of Mansfield (1895–1991), British coalminer and politician, Labour Party MP
- Francis Taylor, Baron Taylor of Hadfield (1905–1995), founder of the housebuilder Taylor Woodrow
- Stephen Taylor, Baron Taylor (1910–1988), the sixth life peer to be created (1958)
- Thomas Taylor, Baron Taylor of Gryfe (1912–2001), British politician
- Tom Taylor, Baron Taylor of Blackburn (1929–2016), Labour member of the House of Lords
- Peter Taylor, Baron Taylor of Gosforth (1930–1997), Lord Chief Justice of England and Wales from 1992 to 1996
- Matthew Taylor, Baron Taylor of Goss Moor (born 1963), Liberal Democrat peer
- John Taylor, Baron Taylor of Holbeach (born 1943), created a Conservative peer in 2006
- John Taylor, Baron Taylor of Warwick (born 1952), the first black Conservative peer

== See also ==
- Lord & Taylor, department store chain
- Baroness Taylor (disambiguation)
