= HMS Lookout =

Two destroyers of the British Royal Navy have been named HMS Lookout.

- The first HMS Lookout (1914), a Laforey-class destroyer, was in service 1914–1922.
- The second HMS Lookout (G32) was in service 1940–1948.
