= HMS Ilfracombe =

HMS Ilfracombe has been the name of two Royal Navy vessels:

- HMS Ilfracombe (1918) was a Hunt-class minesweeper renamed Instow before launch
- HMS Ilfracombe (J95) was a Bangor-class minesweeper launched in 1941 and scrapped in 1948
