= HMS Lance =

Two British Royal Navy warships have been called HMS Lance after the spear.

- The first HMS Lance (1914) was a destroyer launched at Thornycroft in 1914, and fired the first British shot of World War I on 5 August 1914 when she intercepted the German minelayer Königin Luise.
- The second HMS Lance (G87) was an L and M-class destroyer launched in 1940 and sunk by aircraft at Malta on 9 April 1942. She was salvaged and towed to Chatham but found on arrival to be beyond repair.
