= HMS Imogen =

Six ships of the Royal Navy have been called HMS Imogen or HMS Imogene. A seventh was planned but never built:

- HMS Imogen (1800) was an 18-gun sloop, originally the French privateer Diable-a-Quatre. She was captured in 1800 and foundered in 1805.
- HMS Imogen (1805) was a 16-gun brig-sloop launched in 1805 and sold in 1817.
- HMS Imogene (1831) was a 28-gun sixth rate, originally named HMS Pearl, but renamed in 1826 and launched in 1831. She was burnt by accident in 1840.
- HMS Imogene was to have been a wooden screw corvette, ordered in 1861 but cancelled in 1863.
- HMS Imogene (1864) was a Coastguard vessel launched in 1864. She was renamed HMS Argus in 1884 and was sold in 1903.
- HMS Imogene (1882) was an iron screw yacht, formerly the Jacamar, built in 1882 by Barclay, Curle & Co, Glasgow. She was purchased in 1882, renamed HMS Impey in 1919 and was sold later that year.
- HMS Imogen (D44) was an I-class destroyer launched in 1936 and sunk in a collision in 1940.
