= HMS Juniper =

Two vessels of the British Royal Navy have been named Juniper for the juniper:

- HMS Juniper (1809) was a Shamrock-class schooner launched at Bermuda. She participated in one campaign for which her crew was awarded the Naval General Service Medal (1847) with clasp "San Sebastian". She also participated in the capture of several merchant ships. The Navy sold her in 1814.
- HMT Juniper (T123) was a Tree-class minesweeping trawler launched in 1939. The German heavy cruiser Admiral Hipper sank her on 8 June 1940 in the Norwegian Sea.
