= HMS Liverpool =

Seven ships of the Royal Navy have been named HMS Liverpool after the city of Liverpool, whilst another was planned:

- HMS Liverpool (1741) was a 44-gun fifth-rate frigate, built as HMS Enterprise but renamed before being launched in 1741. She was sold in 1756 and became a privateer. She was reacquired by the Navy in 1759 and entered service as the 30-gun HMS Looe (1759). She was sold in 1763.
- HMS Liverpool (1758) was a 28-gun sixth-rate frigate launched in 1758 and wrecked in 1778.
- HMS Liverpool (1814) was a 50-gun frigate, later reclassified as a fourth-rate ship of the line, launched in 1814 and sold in 1822.
- HMS Liverpool was to have been a 58-gun fourth-rate Southampton-class frigate, ordered in 1825 and cancelled in 1829.
- HMS Liverpool (1860) was a fourth-rate screw frigate launched in 1860 and sold in 1875.
- HMS Liverpool (1909) was a Town-class light cruiser launched in 1909 and scrapped in 1921.
- HMS Liverpool (C11) was a later Town-class light cruiser launched in 1938 and scrapped in 1958.
- HMS Liverpool (D92) was a Type 42 destroyer launched in 1980 and deployed to the Persian Gulf during the Iraq War (Operation Telic).

Liverpool was also the former name of the ship-of-the line HMS Imaum, which was taken into the Royal Navy in 1836 as a gift from the Imaum of Muscat, Said bin Sultan, to the British crown; however the name Liverpool was not used in the Royal Navy for this ship.

== Battle honours ==
Ships named Liverpool have earned the following battle honours:

- Heligoland, 1914
- Mediterranean, 1940
- Calabria, 1940
- Arctic, 1942
- Malta Convoys, 1942
