= HMS Ledbury =

Two ships of the Royal Navy have been named HMS Ledbury, named after Ledbury Hunt, Herefordshire:

- The first HMS Ledbury (L90), launched in 1940 was a Hunt-class destroyer that served in World War II and was sold for scrap in 1958.
- The second and current HMS Ledbury (M30), commissioned in 1981, is a Hunt-class mine countermeasures vessel.
