= HMS Lutine =

Three Royal Navy ships have borne the name HMS Lutin or Lutine, Lutine being French for "the tease" or "tormentress" or more literally "imp", and Lutine the feminine:

- HMS Lutin was the French 6-gun brig-aviso Lutin launched in 1788 that HMS Pluto captured off Newfoundland 25 July 1793; she was sold at Plymouth on 26 January 1796.
- HMS Lutine was the French privateer Lutine launched in 1779, that the Royal Navy captured in the Mediterranean in 1798. The Royal Navy commissioned her in 1799. She became a prison hulk in Malta or Gibraltar in 1801, and was sold in April 1802.
- HMS Lutine (1793) was the French frigate Lutine launched in 1779, that passed to British control in 1793 at Toulon, and that the Royal Navy took into service as HMS Lutine. She sank among the West Frisian Islands during a storm in 1799.
