= HMS Irwell =

HMS Irwell has been the name of two Royal Navy vessels:

- HMS Irwell (1923) was a 24-class sloop of war launched as Sir Bevis in 1918. She was renamed Irwell in 1923 and Eaglet in 1926. She was scrapped in 1971.
- HMS Irwell (1926) was a Hunt-class minesweeper laid down as Bridlington she was renamed Goole before her launch in 1919. In 1926 she was completed and renamed Irwell. She was scrapped in 1962.
