= HMS Indus =

Five ships and two establishments of the Royal Navy have borne the name HMS Indus, after the Indus River:

== Ships ==
- HMS Indus (1790) was a storeship, formerly an East Indiaman. She was purchased in 1790, but her fate is unknown.
- HMS Indus (1812) was a 74-gun third-rate ship of the line launched in 1812. She was renamed HMS Bellona in 1818, used for harbour service from 1840 and was broken up in 1868.
- INS Indus (1838) was an iron paddle gunboat launched in 1838 and listed until 1843.
- HMS Indus (1839) was an 80-gun second-rate ship of the line launched in 1839. She was used as a guard ship from 1860 and was sold in 1898.
- HMS Indus (1851) was a gunvessel launched in 1851. Her fate is unknown.

== Establishments ==
- HMS Indus was the name assigned to the Devonport guard ship and flagship of the Port Admiral, between 1860 and 1905:
  - HMS Indus was the original guard ship between 1860 and 1898.
  - HMS Valiant was HMS Indus for a few months in 1898.
- HMS Indus (shore establishment 1906) was the mechanics' training establishment and workshops at Devonport between 1906 and 1922. A number of ships were renamed whilst serving as depot and base ships for the establishment:
  - HMS Defence was renamed HMS Indus in 1898, commissioned as the establishment in 1906, renamed HMS Indus I in 1910 and was paid off in 1922.
  - HMS Temeraire was HMS Indus II between 1910 and 1914.
  - HMS Flora was HMS Indus II between 1915 and 1918.
  - HMS Victorious was HMS Indus II between 1920 and 1922.
  - HMS Bellerophon was HMS Indus III between 1910 and 1922.
  - HMS Valiant was HMS Indus IV between 1904 and 1906.
  - HMS Triumph was HMS Indus IV between 1910 and 1914.
  - HMS Ganges was HMS Indus V between 1910 and 1922.

== See also ==
- HMIS Indus was a Grimsby-class sloop of the Royal Indian Navy launched in 1934 and sunk in 1942.
