= HMS Lewes =

Two ships of the British Royal Navy have been named HMS Lewes after the English town.

- HMS Lewes (1918) was one of 24 Racecourse-class paddle wheel minesweeper, built in March 1918 by Fleming & Ferguson Shipbuilders at Paisley near Glasgow.
- HMS Lewes (G68) was initially USS Craven (DD-70), a Caldwell-class destroyer, in the United States Navy and was launched 29 June 1918 by Norfolk Navy Yard. She was commissioned as HMS Lewes on 23 October 1940. The vessel was scuttled off Australia in 1946.
