= HMS Incendiary =

Three ships of the Royal Navy have borne the name Incendiary, after Incendiary (capable of causing fire):

- HMS Incendiary (1778), an 8-gun fireship, wrecked off Isle of Wight in 1780.
- HMS Incendiary (1782), a 16-gun fireship that the French captured in 1801 in the Mediterranean.
- HMS Incendiary (1804), a 14-gun fireship, formerly Diligence. Sold in 1812.
