= HMS Lurcher =

Five ships of the Royal Navy have borne the name HMS Lurcher

- HMS Lurcher (1761) was a 6-gun cutter, previously the French Comtesse d'Ayen. She was captured in 1761 and sold in 1763.
- HMS Lurcher (1763) was a 6-gun cutter launched in 1763 and sold in 1771.
- HMS Lurcher (1774) was an 8-gun cutter launched in 1774 and sold in 1778.
- HMS Lurcher was a 12-gun cutter, originally launched in 1781 as HMS Pigmy. The French captured her in 1781 but the British recaptured her the next year. She was briefly renamed HMS Lurcher in 1783, with the name reverting to HMS Pigmy later the same year. She was wrecked in 1793.
- HMS Lurcher (1912) was an Acheron-class destroyer launched in 1912 and sold in 1922.

In addition to these vessels, His Majesty's 12-gun hired armed cutter Lurcher served the Royal Navy from 1795 until a French privateer captured her in 1801.
