= HMS Lacedaemonian =

Two ships of the Royal Navy have borne the name HMS Lacedaemonian, after an inhabitant of the region of Greece also known as Laconia:

- HMS Lacedemonian (1796) was a 12-gun brig, previously the French privateer Lacédémonienne. She was captured in 1796 but was recaptured by the French in 1797.
- HMS Lacedaemonian (1812) was a 38-gun fifth rate launched in 1812 and broken up in 1822.
