= HMS Lyme =

At least four vessels of the British Royal Navy have been named HMS Lyme:

- English ship Lyme (1654), 52-gun third rate. Renamed Montagu in 1660.
- HMS Lyme (1695), 20-gun sixth rate.
- HMS Lyme (1740), 24-gun sixth rate.
- HMS Lyme (1748), 28-gun sixth rate.
