= HMS Vulcan =

Eight ships and a shore establishment of the Royal Navy have borne the name HMS Vulcan, after the god Vulcan, of Roman mythology:

== Ships ==
- HMS Vulcan (1691) was an 8-gun fireship launched in 1691 and sunk as a breakwater in 1709.
- HMS Vulcan (1739) was an 8-gun fireship, previously the civilian Hunter. She was purchased in 1739 and hulked in 1743.
- HMS Vulcan (1745) was an 8-gun fireship, previously the civilian Mary. She was purchased in 1745 and sold in 1749.
- HMS Vulcan (1777) was an 8-gun fireship, previously an American merchantman. She was purchased in 1777 and destroyed in 1782 to prevent her capture.
- HMS Vulcan (1783) was a 14-gun fireship launched in 1783. She was destroyed in 1793 to prevent her capture.
- HMS Vulcan (1797) was a 10-gun bomb vessel, previously the civilian Hector. She was purchased in 1797 and was sold in 1802.
- HMS Vulcan was to have been an iron paddle frigate. She was renamed HMS Birkenhead in 1843 before being launched in 1845.
- HMS Vulcan (1849) was an iron screw frigate launched in 1849. She was converted to a troopship in 1851 and was sold in 1867 as the barque Jorawur.
- HMS Vulcan (1889) was a depot ship launched in 1889. She was converted to a training hulk and renamed HMS Defiance III in 1931 and was scrapped in 1955. Two replacement ships were named HMS Vulcan II:
  - Alarm-class torpedo gunboat HMS Onyx was HMS Vulcan II between 1919 and 1924.
  - Acacia-class sloop HMS Lily was HMS Vulcan II between 1923 and 1930.
- HMS Vulcan (1937) was a trawler used as a depot ship for Coastal Forces, then serving as a repair ship for a minesweeping flotilla, being paid off in 1947. HMS Vulcan was involved in lifesaving after the Air Raid on Bari and had some mustard gas casualties as a result.

== Establishments ==
- HMS Vulcan was the Ministry of Defence naval nuclear reactor shore establishment at Dounreay between 1970 and 1981, when it was renamed the Vulcan Naval Reactor Test Establishment.

== See also ==
- HMRC Vulcan, a paddle steamer used in trials against SS Archimedes in 1839.
