= Loyal (given name) =

Loyal is a generally masculine given name which may refer to:

== Men ==
- Loyal Blaine Aldrich (1884–1965), American astrophysicist and astronomer
- Loyal Griggs (1906–1978), American cinematographer
- Loyal M. Haynes (1895–1974), United States Army brigadier general
- L. D. Hotchkiss (1893–1964), American newspaper journalist and editor-in-chief of the Los Angeles Times
- Loyal Jones (1928–2023), American folklorist, Appalachian culture scholar and writer
- Loyal C. Kellogg (1816–1871), American attorney, politician and judge, an associate justice of the Vermont Supreme Court
- Loyal Edwin Knappen (1854–1930), American judge
- Loyal J. Martin (1863–1950), American lawyer and politician
- Loyal Oakley (1898–1990), Australian rules footballer
- Loyal K. Park (1930–2020), American minor league baseball player, college football and basketball coach and college athletics administrator
- Loyal Rue (born 1944), American philosopher of religion
- Loyal B. Stearns (1853–1936), American politician, attorney and jurist
- Loyal Underwood (1893–1966), American actor

== Women ==
- Loyal Garner (1946–2001), Hawaiian musician and member of the Hawaiian singing group Local Divas
