= HMS Kennington =

Two ships of the Royal Navy have borne the name HMS Kennington:

- HMS Kennington (1736), a 24-gun sixth rate, launched in 1736 and broken up at Plymouth in 1749.
- HMS Kennington (1756), a 20-gun sixth-rate vessel, launched in 1756 and broken up at Sheerness in 1774.
