= HMS Proselyte =

Four ships of the British Royal Navy have been named HMS Proselyte:

- HMS Proselyte (1780) was originally the French privateer Stanislas, built at Havre by Messers. Eryes, Houssaye, Le Courveur et Cie., under the direction of François Motard, and launched in 1779. She was armed with 24 or twenty-six 12-pounder guns. In June 1780 her captain grounded her on the coast near Ostend to avoid being captured. She was refloated in July. The Royal Navy purchased her in December and took her into service as HMS Proselyete, a fifth rate of 32 guns (26 × 12-pounders + 6 × 6-pounders). The Royal Navy sold her in 1785. In April 1787, the Régie des Paquebots at Havre purchased her and renamed her the Cinq Cousins, or Paquebot No. 5. In September 1789 she was sold again, this time to her captain, M. Le Fournier, for Lt34,000.
- HMS Proselyte was the French frigate Proselyte, launched in February 1786. The British captured her at Toulon in August 1793 and the Royal Navy commissioned her as a floating battery; she was bombarding Bastia in April 1794 when red-hot shot from shore batteries set her on fire and she had to be scuttled.
- HMS Proselyte (1796) was originally the 36-gun Dutch frigate Jason, She came into the Royal Navy when her crew mutinied and sailed her to Scotland in 1796; she was wrecked off St. Martin in September 1801.
- The fourth HMS Proselyte (1804) was the Newcastle collier Ramillies that the Royal Navy purchased in 1804 and turned into a 24-gun Post-ship; she was later converted to a bomb vessel and was wrecked off Anholt (Denmark) in December 1808.
