= HMS Lobelia =

Two ships of the Royal Navy have been named HMS Lobelia :

- HMS Lobelia (1916) an Arabis-class sloop launched in 1916 and sold in 1920
- HMS Lobelia (K05), a Flower-class corvette launched in 1941 and transferred to the FNFL later that year under the same name. Returned to the Royal Navy in April 1947 and sold the following month for mercantile service
