= HMS Ithuriel =

Two ships of the British Royal Navy have been called HMS Ithuriel after an angel in John Milton's epic poem Paradise Lost:

- The first, HMS Ithuriel (1916), was a Marksman-class flotilla leader originally named Gabriel but renamed before her launching in 1916. After serving through the First World War she was broken up in 1921.
- The second, HMS Ithuriel (H05), was a destroyer built for the Turkish Navy as Gayret but taken over by the Royal Navy on the outbreak of the Second World War whilst still under construction. She was sunk in 1942 but salvaged at the end of the war to be scrapped. The name was originally planned for reuse in 1940 for a minelayer but the boat (pennant M39) was launched as HMS Abdiel instead.
