= HMS Larne =

Four ships of the Royal Navy have borne the name HMS Larne, after the town of Larne. A fifth was renamed shortly before being launched:

- HMS Larne (1814) was a 20-gun sixth rate launched in 1814 and sold in 1828.
- HMS Larne was an 18-gun sloop, launched in 1829 as HMS Lightning, renamed HMS Larne in 1832 and broken up in 1866.
- HMS Larne (1910) was an Acorn-class destroyer launched in 1910 and sold in 1921.
- HMS Larne was to have been a L-class destroyer. She was renamed HMS Gurkha shortly before her launch in 1940, and was sunk in 1943.
- HMS Larne (J274) was an Algerine-class minesweeper launched in 1943. She was sold to the Italian Navy in 1947 and renamed Eritrea, and then Alabarda in 1951. She was broken up in 1981.
