= HMS Kingsmill =

Two ships of the British Royal Navy have been named HMS Kingsmill;

- HMS Kingsmill (1912), an Acasta-class destroyer renamed HMS Sparrowhawk launched in 1912 and entered service in 1913. The ship was scuttled on 1 June 1916 and suffering damage in a collision during the Battle of Jutland.
- HMS Kingsmill (K484), a Captain-class frigate, constructed as a US Evarts-class destroyer escort acquired through Lend-Lease in 1943 and took part in the invasion of Normandy. The ship was returned to the US in 1945 and sold for scrap in 1947.
