= Lawford, West Virginia =

Lawford
- Unincorporated community
- Location within the state of West Virginia Lawford (the United States)
- Coordinates: 39°04′07″N 80°56′10″W
- Country: United States
- State: West Virginia
- County: Ritchie
- Elevation: 823 ft (251 m)
- Time zone: UTC-5 (Eastern (EST))
  - Summer (DST): UTC-4 (EDT)
- GNIS ID: 1554922

Lawford is an unincorporated community in Ritchie County, in the U.S. state of West Virginia.

== History ==
The community was named after Asby Poole Law (1823-1868), a pioneer settler. He arrived with his family in 1848 and settled on a farm originally cleared by Joshua Smith in 1840. A post office called Lawford was established in 1890, and remained in operation until 1943.
