= HMS Lowestoft =

Eight ships of the Royal Navy have borne the name HMS Lowestoft, or the archaic HMS Lowestoffe, after the Suffolk town of Lowestoft:

- HMS Lowestoffe (1697) was a 28-gun fifth rate launched in 1697. She was rebuilt in 1723 as a 20-gun sixth rate and sold in 1774.
- HMS Lowestoffe (1742) was a 24-gun sixth rate launched in 1742 and sold in 1748.
- HMS Lowestoffe (1756) was a 28-gun sixth rate launched in 1756 and sunk in 1760.
- HMS Lowestoffe (1761) was a 32-gun fifth rate launched in 1761 and wrecked in 1801.
- HMS Lowestoft was to have been a 38-gun fifth rate, ordered in 1801 and cancelled in 1805.
- HMS Lowestoft (1913) was a Town-class light cruiser launched in 1913 and scrapped in 1931.
- HMS Lowestoft (U59) was a Grimsby-class sloop launched in 1934. She was sold into mercantile service in 1946 and renamed Miraflores. She was scrapped in 1955.
- HMS Lowestoft (F103) was a Rothesay-class or Type 12I anti-submarine frigate. She was launched in 1960 and sunk as a target in 1986.

There was also HMS Lowestoffe Prize, an 8-gun brig-sloop captured in 1777 and condemned in 1779.
