= HMS Lysander =

Three vessels of the British Royal Navy have been named HMS Lysander, after Lysander, a military commander of ancient Sparta.

- The first Lysander was a 4-gun brig, listed from 1842 to 1844 but with little further information available.
- The second HMS Lysander (1913) was a Laforey-class destroyer launched in 1913 as Ulysses but renamed a few weeks later, and sold in 1922. Rescued the survivors of HMHS Llandovery Castle.
- The third HMS Lysander (J379) was an Algerine-class minesweeper launched in 1943 as HMCS Hespeler, renamed Cornflower in 1956, and broken up 1957.
