= HMS Jaguar =

Two ships of the British Royal Navy have been named HMS Jaguar, after the feline jaguar.

- The first HMS Jaguar (F34) was a J-class destroyer launched in 1938 and sunk 1942 by U-652.
- The second HMS Jaguar (F37) was a Leopard-class frigate launched in 1957 and sold to the Bangladeshi Navy in 1978, subsequently operating as BNS Ali Haider
