= HMS Lyra =

Four ships of the Royal Navy have been named HMS Lyra, after the constellation Lyra, itself from the Greek for Lyre:

- HMS Lyra (1808) was a 10-gun Cherokee-class brig-sloop launched in 1808 and sold in 1818. She then became a whaler making five whale hunting voyages until 1833, when she was last listed.
- HMS Lyra (1821) was a 10-gun Cherokee-class brig-sloop launched in 1821. In 1829 she started sailing as a Falmouth-based, Post Office packet service packet. She was sold in 1845.
- HMS Lyra (1857) was a wooden screw sloop launched in 1857 and broken up in 1876.
- HMS Lyra (1910) was an Acorn-class destroyer launched in 1910 and sold in 1921.
