= HMS Lucifer =

Six ships of the Royal Navy were named Lucifer:-

- HMS Lucifer (1778), an 8-gun fireship purchased in frame at Rotherhithe, later renamed HMS Avenger, sold at New York City in 1783; sailed to London, and in 1784 became the mercantile Flora
- HMS Lucifer (1781), a fireship, mercantile Elizabeth, sold at Deptford in 1784
- HMS Lucifer (1803), an 8-gun bomb vessel, was built as Spring at Whitby in 1800 and sold to the Royal Navy shortly thereafter. The Royal Navy sold her in 1811.
- HMS Lucifer (1837), a paddle gunvessel
- HMS Lucifer (1913), a Laforey-class destroyer
- HMS Lucifer (1856), a steamship
