= French ship Jean Bart (1786) =

History

France
- Name: Jean Bart
- Namesake: Jean Bart
- Builder: Bayonne
- Launched: 1786
- Acquired: Requisitioned in January 1794 in Nantes
- Commissioned: 1793 as a privateer
- Captured: By Britain on 15 April 1795

Great Britain
- Name: HMS Laurel
- Acquired: 1795 by purchase of a prize
- Fate: Sold at Jamaica in 1797

General characteristics
- Class & type: Corvette
- Displacement: 550 tons (French)
- Tons burthen: 42318/94 (bm)
- Length: 107 ft 0 in (32.61 m) (overall); 82 ft 6 1/2 in (25.159 m) (keel)
- Beam: 30 ft 0 in (9.14 m)
- Depth of hold: 8 ft 7 in (2.62 m)
- Sail plan: Full-rigged ship
- Complement: French service: 177; British service: 100
- Armament: French service: 5 × 12-pounder guns, 19 × 8-pounder guns; 1795: 24 × 8-pounder guns; British service=22 × 9-pounder guns

Jean Bart was a merchant vessel built at Bayonne in 1786. Her owners commissioned her at Nantes in 1793 as a privateer. The French Navy requisitioned her in January 1794 and classed her as a corvette and listed her as Jean Bart No. 2 to distinguish her from the French corvette Jean Bart (1793). The Navy intended to rename her Imposant in May 1795, but the Royal Navy captured her first.

On 15 April 1795, a naval squadron under Sir John Borlase Warren gave chase to Jean Bart, described in the report of the capture as being a ship-corvette of 26 guns and 187 men. The actual captor, off the Île de Ré, was HMS Artois.

The Royal Navy took Jean Bart into service as the post ship HMS Laurel. Between July and 8 December 1795 the Royal Navy had Laurel fitted a Portsmouth. She had been flush-decked, but received a small forecastle, quarterdeck, and extra platforms. She was commissioned under Captain Robert Rolles. He had been promoted to post captain on 12 August 1785; he had been captain of the hired armed ship Lord Mulgrave.

Rolles sailed Laurel for the coast of Africa and then the Leeward Islands. In May 1796 Laurel participated in the capture of Saint Lucia under Rear Admiral Sir Hugh Cloberry Christian and General Ralph Abercrombie, and shared in the prize money for the capture.

Laurel was sold in 1797 at Jamaica.
