= HMS Insolent =

Four ships of the Royal Navy have borne the name HMS Insolent:

- French brig Brave (1793), renamed Arrogante in 1795 and captured by HMS Jason on 19 April 1798, renamed HMS Insolent on 31 August 1798, and serving thereafter in the Royal Navy until sold on 11 June 1818.
- HMS Insolent (1811), a gun-brig.
- HMS Insolent (1856), a Albacore-class wooden steam gunboat launched on 26 January 1856 and sold 1 May 1869.
- HMS Insolent (1881), a 265-ton iron steam flatiron gunboat launched on 15 March 1881 and reduced to harbor service as a gate vessel in Portsmouth Harbour in January 1918; foundered on 1 July 1922.
