= HMS Leocadia =

Three vessels of the Royal Navy have been named HMS Leocadia:

- HMS Leocadia (1781) was the Spanish 34-gun frigate Santa Leocadia, captured by HMS Canada in 1781 and taken into service as a 36-gun frigate. She was sold in 1794.
- HMS Leocadia (1804) was the Spanish 36-gun frigate Santa Clara captured at the action of 5 October 1804. She was initially renamed Leocadia before being commissioned as Clara. Sold in 1815.
- HMS Leocadia (1805) was a Spanish 16-gun brig-sloop captured by HMS Helena in 1805. She was sold in 1814.
