= HMS Stalker (L3515) =

1944 LST(3)-class tank landing ship

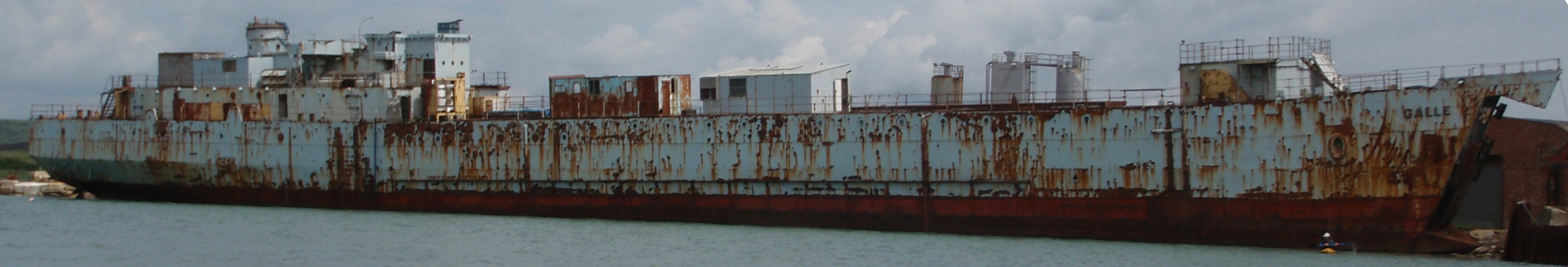
- HMS Stalker in 2010

History

United Kingdom
- Name: HMS Stalker
- Builder: Yarrows Ltd., Esquimalt
- Launched: 16 December 1944
- Commissioned: 1947
- Decommissioned: May 1970
- Renamed: Was LST 3515 until 1947
- Reclassified: Submarine support ship in 1958
- Fate: Sold for scrapping in 2002; Scrapped in 2010

General characteristics
- Type: Landing Ship, Tank Mk III
- Tonnage: 2,256 long tons (2,292 t) (light); 4,980 long tons (5,060 t) (deep load)
- Length: 345.57 ft (105.33 m)
- Beam: 53.97 ft (16.45 m)
- Draught: 12 ft 5 in (3.78 m)
- Depth: 11.51 ft (3.51 m)
- Propulsion: 2 shafts; vertical triple expansion; 2 Admiralty 3-drum boilers; 5500ihp
- Speed: 13.5 knots (25.0 km/h)
- Range: 1400 tons of oil
- Capacity: 170 troops; 15 × 40 ton tanks or 20 x 25-ton tanks; 14 × 3-ton lorries
- Complement: 118-190
- Armament: 4 × 40mm Bofors (2 x 2); 6 × 20mm guns

HMS Stalker was a Mark III LST (Landing Ship, Tank) that was built during the later part of the Second World War, and became the last steam-driven LST to be scrapped. She initially entered service under the designation LST 3515, but was commissioned into the Royal Navy in 1947 as HMS Stalker.

The ship was built by Canadian Yarrow at Esquimalt. She was completed too late to see action in the war, and eventually served in a submarine support role in Northern Ireland, before being transferred to Rosyth dockyard as part of the nuclear submarine refit support.

== Scrapping ==
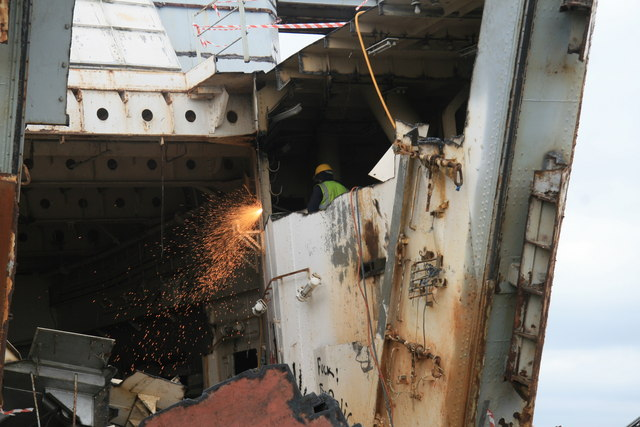
HMS Stalker being broken up

The ship was added to the Royal Navy’s scrapping list in May 1970, though continuing to serve as part of the Submarine Refit Group in Rosyth Dockyard until 2002, when nuclear refitting in Rosyth ceased. She was sold to Pounds of Portsmouth in 2002, arriving there to be scrapped on 10 December 2002. She was offered for preservation between 2004 and 2005, but it was confirmed in January 2006 that she would be broken up. After further discussions with heritage and preservation groups, in 2008 her bow doors were removed and she was broken up in 2010 at Pounds scrap yard, a process recorded by National Historic Ships.

== In popular culture ==
Whilst awaiting disposal at Pounds of Portsmouth, she was used for the filming of episodes 55 & 56 of Silent Witness, as the fictitious ship Galle. The fictitious name can be seen painted on the bow in the photo above the history section to the right.
