= HMS Leamington =

HMS Leamington has been the name of two Royal Navy vessels:

- HMS Leamington (1918) was a Hunt-class minesweeper launched in 1918 and sold in 1928
- HMS Leamington (G19) was a Wickes-class destroyer USS Twiggs transferred to the Royal Navy under the Destroyers for Bases Agreement in 1940. It was transferred from the Royal Navy to the Royal Canadian Navy in 1942, and returned to the Royal Navy in 1950 and scrapped the following year.
