= HMT Laurel =

History

United Kingdom
- Name: HMS Laurel
- Launched: 15 May 1930
- Completed: 12 June 1930.
- Acquired: November 1935
- Out of service: 1946
- Fate: Broken up 1955

General characteristics
- Type: Minesweeper Trawler
- Tonnage: 365 tons (gross); 590 tons (displacement)
- Length: 141 ft 3 in (43.05 m)
- Beam: 24 ft 6 in (7.47 m)
- Armament: 1 x 4" gun

HMT Laurel (T 29) was a trawler launched in 1930 that the Admiralty acquired in 1935 and converted to a minesweeper. She served throughout World War II before being sold in 1946. After many years commercial service she was scrapped in 1955.

== Commercial trawler ==
Cook, Welton & Gemmill (Beverley, U.K.) built her in 1930 as the trawler Kingston Cyanite for the Kingston Steam Fishing Company of Hull.

== Naval Service ==
In November 1935 the Admiralty acquired her and 19 others for conversion to minesweepers, naming all 20 after trees. She served in UK waters throughout the war, employed in minesweeping, until 1943 when she was used as a wreck dispersal vessel, based at Port Talbot. In March 1944 she assigned to Operation Neptune – the Normandy landings – but remained in readiness at Port Talbot. Operation Neptune then ended on 3 July 1944.

== Post-war and fate ==
The Admiralty sold her in 1946. She was renamed Strathyre in 1947 and sold again in 1951 to Clifton Steam Trawling Co., Ltd., who renamed her Patricia Hague (FD58). She was scrapped at Troon on 23 May 1955.

== Bibliography ==
- Colledge, J. J.; Warlow, Ben & Bush, Steve (2020). Ships of the Royal Navy: The Complete Record of all Fighting Ships of the Royal Navy from the 15th Century to the Present (5th revised and updated ed.). Barnsley, UK: Seaforth Publishing. ISBN 978-1-5267-9327-0.
