= HMS Impregnable =

Two ships and two establishments of the Royal Navy have been named HMS Impregnable:

== Ships ==
- HMS Impregnable (1786) was a 98-gun second rate. This ship of the line was launched in 1786 and wrecked in 1799.
- HMS Impregnable (1810) was an 98-gun second rate launched in 1810. She became a school ship in 1862, was renamed HMS Kent in 1888, HMS Caledonia in 1891, and was sold in 1906.

== Training establishment ==
- HMS Impregnable (1862 training establishment) was a training establishment started at Devonport in 1862, and active until 1929. As training ships were replaced or added to the establishment, each was renamed Impregnable when she took on the role:
  - HMS Impregnable was the original school ship between 1862 and 1888.
  - HMS Howe was HMS Impregnable between 1885 and 1911, and HMS Impregnable I between 1911 and 1919.
  - HMS Powerful was HMS Impregnable between 1919 and 1929.
  - HMS Inconstant was HMS Impregnable II between 1911 and 1919, and HMS Impregnable (Old) between 1919 and 1922.
  - HMS Andromeda was HMS Impregnable II between 1919 and 1931.
  - HMS Black Prince was HMS Impregnable III between 1910 and 1922.
  - HMS Ganges was HMS Impregnable III between 1922 and 1929.
  - HMS Circe was HMS Impregnable IV between 1915 and 1922.
  - HMS Caroline was HMS Impregnable IV between 1919 and 1929.
- HMS Impregnable (1935 training establishment) was a training establishment for 'hostilities only' communications ratings at Plymouth between 1935 and 1947. After decommissioning HMS Impregnable was reopened soon after, remaining in commission until 1948.
