= HMS Loyalty =

Three ships of the Royal Navy have borne the name HMS Loyalty:

- HMS Loyalty (1650) was a 34-gun ship in service between 1650 and 1653.
- HMS Loyalty (1694) was a stores hulk purchased in 1694. She foundered in 1701.
- HMS Loyalty (J217) was an Algerine-class minesweeper launched in 1942 as HMS Rattler. She was renamed HMS Loyalty in 1943 and was sunk in 1944.
