= HMS Jonquil =

Two ships of the Royal Navy have borne the name HMS Jonquil, after the flower:

- HMS Jonquil (1915) was an Acacia-class sloop launched in 1915 and sold in May 1920 to Portugal, becoming Portuguese warship NRP Carvalho Araújo, discarded 1959.
- HMS Jonquil (K68) was a Flower-class corvette launched in 1940 and sold in 1946 becoming the mercantile Lemnos
