= Lady Taylor (ship) =

History

Great Britain
- Name: Crown
- Launched: 1781, Yarmouth
- Renamed: Lady Taylor
- Fate: Wrecked August 1796

General characteristics
- Tons burthen: 379, or 400 (bm)
- Armament: 1782: 4 × 6-pounder guns; Armed ship:20 guns

Lady Taylor was launched at Yarmouth in 1781 as Crown; she was renamed Lady Taylor the next year, and sailed as a West Indiaman. Between April 1793 and September 1794 she served as a hired armed sloop for the Royal Navy, during which time she convoyed merchant ships and captured one Dutch merchant ship. She returned to the West Indies trade and was wrecked in August 1796.

== Career ==
Lady Taylor first appeared in Lloyd's Register (LR) in 1782.

Year	Master	Owner	Trade	Source
1782	R.Ruthven	Mangles & Co.	London–Jamaica	LR
1787	Ruthven; W.Black	Mangles & Co. Long & Co.	London–Jamaica	LR
1792	W.Black; R.Major	G.&J.Abel	London–Jamaica; London−Narva	LR; small repairs 1790
1793	R.Major; Welsher	G.&J.Abel	London−Narva	LR; small repairs 1790

Hired armed ship: The Royal Navy hired Lady Taylor on a contract that lasted from 27 April 1793, to 11 September 1794. Commander Richard Rutherford commissioned Lady Taylor in 1793.

In March 1794, Lloyd's List reported that the armed ship Lady Taylor had brought into Dover the heavily laden merchantman Jonge Pieter.

Year	Master	Owner	Trade	Source
1794	Welsher	J&J Abel	London	LR; small repairs 1790

== Fate ==
In August 1796 Lady Taylor, with Walstrew as master, was wrecked on the Goodwin Sands. She was on a voyage from Jamaica to London.
