= HMS Lawford =

Two ships of the Royal Navy have been named HMS Lawford, after Admiral Sir John Lawford:

- HMS Lawford (1913) was a Laforey-class destroyer, previously named HMS Ivanhoe but renamed shortly after being launched in 1913. She was sold for scrapping in 1921.
- HMS Lawford (K514) was a Captain-class frigate launched in 1943. She was transferred to the Royal Navy under lend-lease and was sunk in an air attack in 1944.
