= HMS Immortalité =

HMS Immortalité has been the name of more than one ship of the British Royal Navy, and may refer to:

- HMS Immortalité (1798), a 42-gun fifth rate, formerly the French frigate Immortalité, captured from France in 1798 and scrapped in 1806
- HMS Immortalité, a 38-gun fifth rate, formerly the French Infatigable, captured from France in 1806 and scrapped in 1811.
- HMS Immortalité (1814), a 38-gun fifth rate, formerly the French Alcmène, captured from France in 1814 and renamed HMS Dunira, renamed HMS Immortalité later in 1814, and sold in 1837
- HMS Immortalité (1859), a wooden screw frigate launched in 1859 and sold in 1883
- HMS Immortalité (1887), an armored cruiser launched in 1887 and sold for scrapping in 1907

== See also ==
- Immortalité (disambiguation)
