= HMS Llewellyn =

Two ships of the Royal Navy have borne the name HMS Llewellyn, a Welsh name, and one used by a number of historic figures including Llywelyn the Great:

- HMS Llewellyn (1848) was a wooden paddle packet launched in 1848 and sold into mercantile service in 1850.
- HMS Llewellyn (1913) was a Laforey-class destroyer, built as HMS Picton but renamed before being launched in 1913. She was sold in 1922.
