= HMS Londonderry =

Two ships of the Royal Navy have been named HMS Londonderry, after the city of Londonderry in Northern Ireland.

- HMS Londonderry (U76) was a Grimsby-class sloop launched in 1935 and sold in 1948.
- HMS Londonderry (F108) was a Rothesay-class frigate launched in 1958. She was a training ship between 1984 and 1988, and was expended as a target in June 1989 (After rocket hits, finally sunk by the long range gunfire of the German destroyer Rommel).
