= HMS Leveret =

At least four vessels of the Royal Navy have borne the name HMS Leveret.

- HMS Leveret (1806), was a Cruizer-class brig-sloop launched in 1806 and wrecked the next year.
- HMS Leveret (1808), was a Cherokee-class brig-sloop launched in 1808 and sold in 1822.
- HMS Leveret (1825), was another Cherokee-class brig-sloop launched in 1825 and sold in 1843.
- HMS Leveret (1856), was an Albacore-class gunboat launched in 1856 and broken up in 1867.
