= HMS Illustrious =

There have been five ships in the Royal Navy to bear the name HMS Illustrious. The ship's motto is "Vox Non Incerta" which translates as "No Uncertain Sound".

- HMS Illustrious (1789) was a 74-gun third rate, and launched at Buckler's Hard in 1789. She had two engagements against the French Navy, at Toulon in 1793 and at Genoa where she suffered severe damage and won a battle honour. While returning home in tow for repairs she ran aground due to an extremely violent storm. Shortly afterwards she was set ablaze and abandoned.
- HMS Illustrious (1803) was launched at Rotherhithe in 1803 and was like her predecessor a 74-gun third rate. She was involved in battles off the Basque Roads, in which she won a battle honour, and off Java in Indonesia. In 1854 she became a training ship and continued as one until she was broken up in 1868 in Portsmouth.
- HMS Illustrious (1896) was a Majestic-class battleship, launched in 1896 and scrapped in 1920. Two of her 12-inch guns were remounted in the Tyne Turrets.
- HMS Illustrious (87) was an Illustrious-class aircraft carrier commissioned in 1940. In the same year she became the first carrier to strike against an enemy fleet, and was in service until 1954.
- HMS Illustrious (R06) was an Invincible-class aircraft carrier commissioned in 1982 and decommissioned in 2014.

== Battle honours ==
- Genoa 1795
- Basque Roads 1809
- Taranto 1940
- Mediterranean 1940–1941
- Malta Convoys 1941
- Diego Suarez 1942
- Salerno 1943
- Sabang 1944
- Palembang 1945
- Okinawa 1945
