= HMS Loyal London =

Ship of the line of the Royal Navy

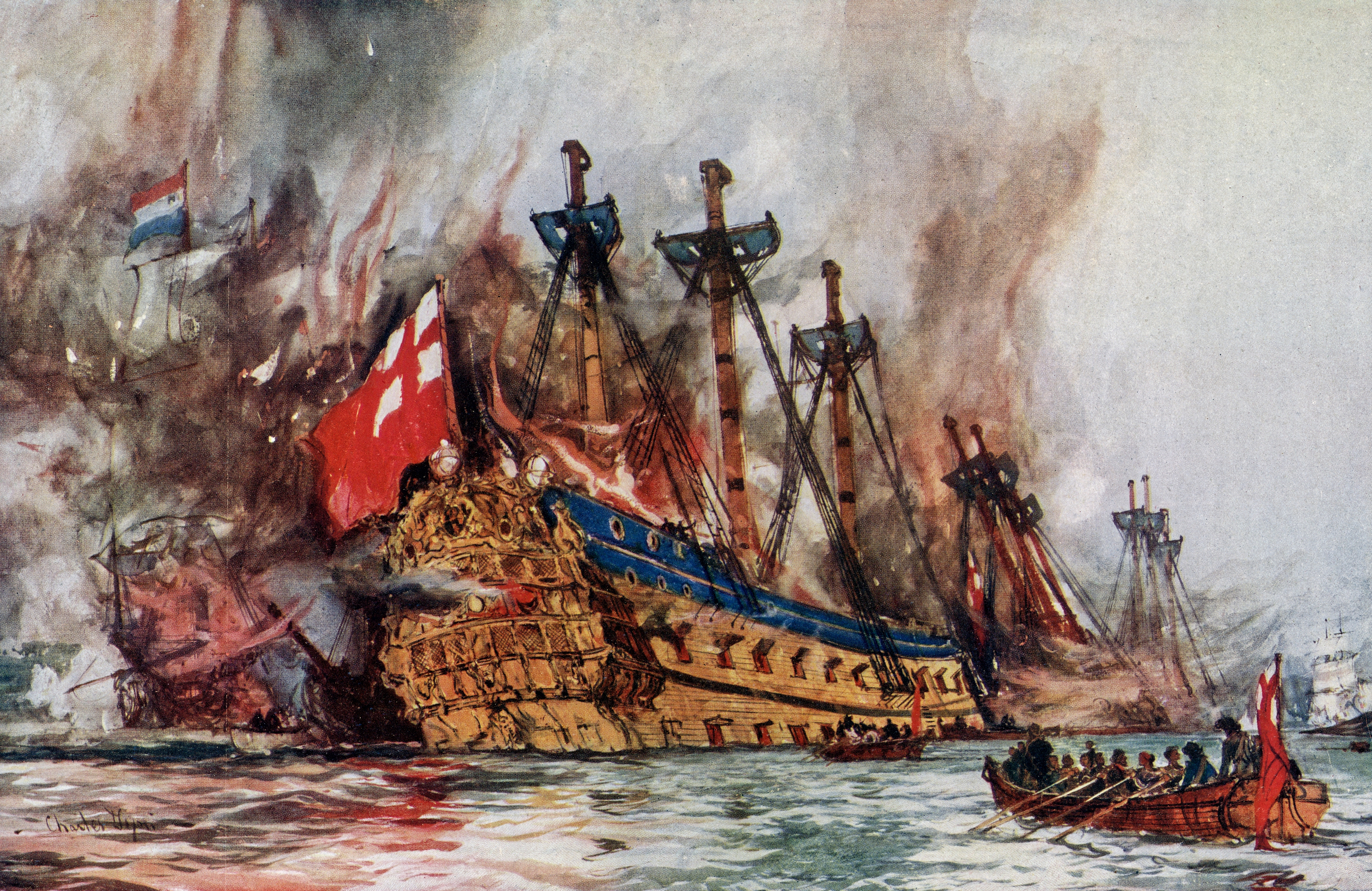
- Painting of Loyal London being burnt by Charles Dixon

History

England
- Name: Loyal London
- Ordered: April 1665
- Builder: John Taylor, Deptford Dockyard
- Launched: 10 June 1666
- Commissioned: 16 July 1666
- Fate: Burnt, 1667

General characteristics
- Class & type: 80-gun second-rate ship of the line (Note: Colledge wrongly records her as being a 96-gun first rate, confusing her with the ship built in 1670)
- Tons burthen: 1,236 (bm)
- Length: 127 ft (39 m) (keel)
- Beam: 41 ft 9 1/2 in (12.7 m)
- Depth of hold: 17 ft (5.2 m)
- Sail plan: Full-rigged ship
- Armament: 80 guns of various weights of shot (later raised to 92 guns)

Loyal London was an 80-gun second-rate ship of the line of the Royal Navy, launched on 10 June 1666 at Deptford Dockyard with a burthen of 1,236 tons. She was established with 80 guns comprising 22 cannon-of-seven, four demi-cannon, 26 culverins and 28 demi-culverins; in July 1666 this was raised to 92 guns, comprising seven cannon-of-seven, 19 demi-cannon, 28 culverins, 26 12-pounders and 12 demi-culverins. Loyal London was destroyed by fire on 14 June 1667, during the Dutch raid on the Medway. A quantity of her timbers were salvaged on 15 July, and were transported to Deptford for reuse in construction of the 96-gun first rate London.
