= Indonesia–Malaysia confrontation order of battle: Commonwealth =

This is an order of battle listing the British Commonwealth forces involved in the Indonesia–Malaysia confrontation.

== Commonwealth order of battle ==
The following units served in North Borneo, Sarawak or Brunei between 24 December 1962 and 11 August 1966, the eligible dates for the 1962 General Service Medal with clasp BORNEO. Those marked * were based in UK. The conditions for the BORNEO clasp were 30 days service ashore in Brunei, Sabah or Sarawak or afloat in coastal waters or one operational flying sortie in support of operations ashore. In addition the MALAY PENINSULA clasp was awarded for 30 days service ashore in the Malay Peninsula or Singapore or afloat in their waters or carrying out 30 air patrols over the land area between 17 August 1964 and 11 August 1966.

In addition to the units listed below, between 1963 and 1966 there were up to 80 ships from the Royal Navy, Royal Australian Navy, Royal Malay Navy and Royal New Zealand Navy. Most of these were patrol craft, minesweepers, frigates and destroyers patrolling the coast-line to intercept Indonesian insurgents. One of the two Commando Carriers, HMS Albion and HMS Bulwark, was also committed throughout the period of Confrontation usually in their transport role for troops, helicopters and army aircraft between Singapore and Borneo.

An indication of relative effort is 'infantry battalion months' for the last 12 months of the war in Sarawak and Sabah. Of the 144 such months 36 were Malaysian, 48 Gurkha, 52 British, 4 Australian and 4 New Zealand.

=== United Kingdom ===
- Royal Navy
  - HMS Woolaston
  - HMS Triumph
  - HMS Albion
  - HMS Bulwark
  - HMS Victorious
  - HMS Centaur
  - HMS Chichester
  - HMS Eagle
  - HMS Kent
  - HMS Hampshire
  - HMS Cavendish
  - HMS Caesar
  - HMS Cambrian
  - HMS Berwick
  - HMS Dido
  - HMS Fiskerton
  - HMS Maryton
  - PLUS: 17 other destroyers and frigates, twelve minesweepers and five submarines.
  - 40 Commando Royal Marines stationed at HMS Sembawang, Singapore
  - 42 Commando Royal Marines stationed at HMS Sembawang
  - Sections of Special Boat Service
  - Detachments of 845 Naval Air Squadron (Wessex) stationed at HMS Simbang, Singapore
  - Detachments of 846 Naval Air Squadron (Whirlwind) stationed at HMS Simbang
  - Detachments of 848 Naval Air Squadron (Wessex) stationed at HMS Simbang
  - 849 NAS Fairey Gannet AEW on HMS Victorious
- British Army
  - Squadron of Life Guards
  - Squadrons of 1st The Queen's Dragoon Guards*
  - Squadrons of Queen's Royal Irish Hussars
  - Squadrons of 4th Royal Tank Regiment
  - H Squadron of 5th Royal Tank Regiment*
  - V Light, 132 (Bengal Rocket Troop) Medium Batteries (of 6th Light Regiment Royal Artillery)
  - T (Shah Sujah's Troop) and 9 (Plassey) Light Air Defence Batteries (of 12th Light Air Defence Regiment)
  - 30 Light Anti Defence Battery (Roger's Company) (of 16th Light Air Defence Regiment)*
  - 53 (Louisburg) Light Anti Aircraft Battery (now 53 (Louisburg) Battery RA of 22nd Light Air Defence Regiment* (disbanded 2004))
  - 11 (Sphinx) Light Anti Defence Battery (of 34th Light Air Defence Regiment)*
  - 40th Light Regiment Royal Artillery (comprising 38 (Seringapatum), 129 (Dragon), 137 (Java) Light Batteries)*
  - 70 Light, 176 (Abu Klea) Light, 170 (Imjin) Medium Batteries (of 45th Field Regiment Royal Artillery)
  - 8 (Alma), 7 (Sphinx), 79 (Kirkee), 145 (Maiwand), Commando Light Batteries (of 29th and 95th Commando Light Regiments, Royal Artillery)
  - 1st Battalion, Scots Guards
  - Guards Independent Parachute Company
  - 1st Battalion, King's Own Scottish Borderers*
  - 1st Battalion, Gordon Highlanders*
  - 1st Battalion, Royal Ulster Rifles*
  - 1st Battalion, Queen's Own Highlanders
  - 1st Battalion, Queen's Own Buffs, The Royal Kent Regiment
  - 1st Battalion, Durham Light Infantry
  - 1st Battalion, Argyll and Sutherland Highlanders
  - 1st Battalion, Royal Leicestershire Regiment
  - 1st Battalion, King's Own Yorkshire Light Infantry
  - 1st Green Jackets (43rd and 52nd)
  - 2nd Green Jackets, The King's Royal Rifle Corps
  - 3rd Green Jackets, The Rifle Brigade
  - 2nd Battalion, The Parachute Regiment*
  - D Company, 3rd Battalion, The Parachute Regiment*
  - 1st Battalion, Royal Hampshire Regiment*
  - 22 Special Air Service Regiment*
  - 1st and 2nd Battalions of 2nd Gurkha Rifles
  - 1st and 2nd Battalions, 6th Gurkha Rifles;
  - 1st and 2nd Battalions, 7th Gurkha Rifles;
  - 1st and 2nd Battalions, 10th Gurkha Rifles;
  - Gurkha Independent Parachute Company
  - Detachments 656 Squadron Army Air Corps
  - various units from Corps of Royal Engineers
  - various units from the Royal Corps of Signals
- Royal Air Force
  - Detachments 15 Squadron RAF Regiment
  - Detachments 26 Squadron LAA. RAF Regiment stationed at RAF Changi, Singapore
  - Detachments 34 Squadron (Beverley) stationed at RAF Changi
  - Detachments 48 Squadron (Hastings and Beverley) stationed at RAF Changi
  - Detachments 209 Squadron (Pioneer and Twin Pioneer) stationed at RAF Seletar, Singapore
  - Detachments 52 Squadron (Valletta) stationed at RAAF Butterworth, Malaya
  - Detachments 66 Squadron (Belvedere) stationed at RAF Seletar
  - Detachments 103 Squadron (Westland Whirlwind HC 10) stationed at RAF Seletar
  - Detachments 110 Squadron (Westland Sycamore then Whirlwind) stationed at RAF Seletar
  - Detachments 205 Squadron (AVRO Shackleton MR Mk2) stationed at RAF Changi
  - 225 Squadron (Westland Whirlwind HC 2)* stationed at RAF Seletar
  - 230 Squadron (Westland Whirlwind HC 10)* stationed at RAF Seletar
  - 81 Squadron (Canberra PR 9) stationed at RAF Tengah, Singapore
  - 20 Squadron (Hawker Hunter) stationed at RAF Tengah
  - 60 Squadron (Gloster Javelin) stationed at RAF Tengah
  - 64 Squadron (Gloster Javelin) stationed at RAF Tengah
  - 45 Squadron (Canberra) stationed at RAF Tengah
  - 15 Squadron Handley Page Victor stationed in at RAF Tengah and RAAF Butterworth
  - 215 Squadron Armstrong Whitworth AW.660 Argosy stationed at RAF Changi
  - 129 Signals Unit Radars Type 13, 14 and 15

=== Australia ===
- Australian Army
  - 3rd Battalion, Royal Australian Regiment
  - 4th Battalion, Royal Australian Regiment
  - 1 and 2 Squadrons of the Special Air Service Regiment
  - 102nd Field Battery, Royal Australian Artillery
  - 111th Light Anti-Aircraft Battery (Butterworth)
  - 110th Light Anti-Aircraft Battery - relieving Battery from May/June 1966
  - 1st Field Squadron, Royal Australian Engineers
  - 7th Field Squadron, Royal Australian Engineers
  - 21st Construction Squadron, Royal Australian Engineers
  - 22nd Construction Squadron, Royal Australian Engineers
  - 24th Construction Squadron, Royal Australian Engineers
  - 2nd Field Troop, Royal Australian Engineers
- Royal Australian Air Force
  - No. 2 Squadron RAAF (GAF Canberras)
  - No. 3 Squadron RAAF (CAC Sabres)
  - No. 5 Squadron RAAF (UH-1 Iroquois helicopters)
  - No. 77 Squadron RAAF (CAC Sabres at Butterworth and then Changi, covering daylight operations)
- Royal Australian Navy
  - HMAS Curlew
  - HMAS Gull
  - HMAS Hawk
  - HMAS Ibis
  - HMAS Snipe
  - HMAS Teal
  - HMAS Duchess
  - HMAS Vampire
  - HMAS Vendetta
  - HMAS Derwent
  - HMAS Parramatta
  - HMAS Yarra

=== Malaysia ===
- Malaysian Army
  - Squadron of Malaysian Reconnaissance Regiment
  - A and B Batteries (of 1st Regiment, Malaysian Artillery)
  - 3rd Battalion, Royal Malay Regiment
  - 5th Battalion, Royal Malay Regiment
  - 8th Battalion, Royal Malay Regiment
  - 1st Battalion, Singapore Infantry Regiment
  - 2nd Battalion, Singapore Infantry Regiment
  - 1st Battalion, Malaysian Rangers
  - 2nd battalion, Malaysian Rangers
- Royal Malaysian Navy
  - KD Sri Perak
  - KD Sri Perlis
  - KD Sri Selangor (K3139)
  - KD Hang Tuah (K433)
- Royal Malaysian Air Force
  - Squadron (Alouette III)
  - Squadron (Twin Pioneer)
- Royal Federation of Malayan Police
  - Police Special Branch
  - Battalion of Police Field Force
  - Marine Police Force

=== New Zealand ===
- New Zealand Army
  - 1st Battalion, Royal New Zealand Infantry Regiment
  - 1st Ranger Squadron
- Royal New Zealand Air Force
  - No. 14 Squadron RNZAF (Canberra B(I)12) based RAF Tengah (1964–66) with deployments to RAF Labuan (1964), RAAF Butterworth (1965), RAF Gong Kedah (1965)
  - No. 41 Squadron RNZAF (Bristol Freighter) based RAF Changi with detachments to RAF Kuching throughout the period of Confrontation
- Royal New Zealand Navy
  - HMNZS Royalist
  - HMNZS Otago
  - HMNZS Taranaki
  - HMNZS Hickleton
  - HMNZS Santon
  - HMNZS Blackpool
