= 16th Minesweeping Squadron (Australia) =

Military Minesweeping Squadron

The 16th Minesweeping Squadron was a Royal Australian Navy (RAN) minesweeping squadron. It was formed with the purchase of six Ton class minesweepers from the Royal Navy in 1962; the vessels travelled from Britain to Australia between October and December 1962 in the company of the oiler HMAS Supply.

On 19 May 1964, the Squadron, was deployed to Singapore as part of the RAN's commitment to the Indonesia–Malaysia confrontation.

== Ships of the Squadron ==
- HMAS Snipe
- HMAS Curlew
- HMAS Hawk
- HMAS Teal
- HMAS Gull
- HMAS Ibis 1183
