= HMS Curlew =

Nine ships and a base of the Royal Navy have borne the name HMS Curlew after the bird, the curlew:

- HMS Curlew (1795) was a 16-gun brig sloop launched in 1795 that foundered in 1796.
- HMS Curlew (1803) was a 16-gun sloop, previously named Leander, purchased in 1803 and sold in 1810.
- HMS Curlew (1812) was an 18-gun brig sloop of the Cruizer class launched in 1812 and sold in 1822 for use in the opium trade, being renamed Jamesina.
- HMS Curlew (1830) was a 10-gun brig sloop of the Cherokee class launched in 1830 and broken up in 1840.
- HMS Curlew (1854) was a Swallow-class screw sloop launched in 1854 and sold in 1865.
- HMS Curlew (1868) was a Plover-class gunvessel launched in 1868 and sold in 1882.
- HMS Curlew (1885) was a torpedo gunvessel launched in 1885 and sold in 1906.
- HMS Curlew (D42) was a C-class cruiser launched in 1917 and sunk in 1940.
- HMAS Curlew was a Ton-class minesweeper, launched in 1953 as HMS Montrose, renamed HMS Chediston in 1958, and then HMAS Curlew on her transfer to the Royal Australian Navy in 1962. She was paid off in 1990, and sold in 1997. She was taken to Hobart in 1998 where there are plans as of 2003 to preserve her as a museum ship.
- HMS Curlew (shore establishment) was RNAS St Merryn near St Merryn, Cornwall, previously commissioned as HMS Vulture from 1940 until 1953, when the naval air station was then recommissioned as HMS Curlew, but closed in 1956 and was sold in 1959.
