= HMS Brereton =

Minehunter of the Royal Navy

History

United Kingdom
- Name: HMS Brereton
- Launched: 14 May 1953
- Commissioned: 9 July 1954
- Renamed: HMS St David between 1954 and November 1961
- Identification: Pennant number M1113
- Fate: Broken up in 1992

General characteristics
- Class & type: Ton-class minehunter
- Displacement: 440 tons
- Length: 152 ft (46.3 m)
- Beam: 28 ft (8.5 m)
- Draught: 8 ft (2.4 m)
- Propulsion: Originally Mirrlees diesel, later Napier Deltic, producing 3,000 shp (2,200 kW) on each of two shafts
- Speed: 15 knots (28 km/h; 17 mph)
- Armament: 1 × Bofors 40 mm L/60 gun; 1 × Oerlikon 20 mm cannon; 1 × M2 Browning machine gun

HMS Brereton (M1113) was a Ton-class minesweeper of the Royal Navy. Brereton was built by the Lowestoft shipbuilder Richard Ironworks, and was launched in 1953 and entered service in 1954.

== Construction and design ==
Brereton was ordered on 9 September 1950 and was originally to be named Red Beetle, was laid down at Richard Ironworks' Lowestoft yard on 25 September 1951. The ship was renamed Brereton in March 1952. Brereton was launched on 14 March 1953 and commissioned on 9 July 1954.

She was 152 feet (46.33 m) long overall and 140 feet (42.67 m) between perpendiculars, with a beam of 28 feet 9 inches (8.76 m) and a draught of 8 feet 3 inches (2.51 m). Displacement was 360 long tons (370 t) normal and 425 long tons (432 t) deep load. Brereton was initially powered by a pair of 12-cylinder Mirrlees diesel engines, driving two shafts and giving a total of 2,500 shaft horsepower (1,900 kW), giving the ship a speed of 15 knots (17 mph; 28 km/h). 45 tons of fuel were carried, giving a range of 3,000 nautical miles (3,500 mi; 5,600 km) at 8 knots (9.2 mph; 15 km/h).

Armament consisted of a single Bofors 40 mm anti-aircraft gun forward and two Oerlikon 20 mm cannon aft. Minesweeping equipment included wire sweeps for sweeping moored contact mines and acoustic or magnetic sweeps for dealing with influence mines. The ship had a crew of 27 in peacetime and 39 in wartime.

== Service ==
Brereton joined the South Wales division of the Royal Navy Reserve in September 1954 and was renamed HMS St David in May 1955. She served as such until November 1961, when her name reverted to Brereton. In 1965 she joined the Royal Navy's Fishery Protection Squadron.

From July 1967 to December 1968 Brereton was converted to a minehunter at Portsmouth. Her magnetic sweep gear was removed and Type 193 Sonar was fitted to detect mines which could then be destroyed by divers while active rotors incorporating electric motors were fitted to aid slow speed manoeuvrability, and the ship's engines replaced by two Napier Deltic diesel engines rated at 3,000 brake horsepower (2,200 kW). Armament was changed to two Bofors guns, although one was later removed.

In 1969 Brereton joined the 9th Mine Countermeasures Squadron based in the Persian Gulf, returning to British waters in December 1971. In 1971, she rejoined the Fishery Protection Squadron. On 12 February 1976 she collided with the Danish fishing Vessel Cyrano off Hartlepool, and was holed below the waterline, having to be taken under tow by the salvage vessel RMAS Kinloss. Brereton was under repair until August that year. She suffered an engine room fire in June 1978, with repairs lasting two months, and was refitted at Gibraltar in 1979. In 1980, she joined the Tyne Division of the Royal Navy Reserve, part of the 10th Mine Countermeasures Squadron, and in 1981, the Mersey Division. She remained based on the Mersey in 1984. In 1986, she joined the 3rd Mine Countermeasures Squadron based at Rosyth, and in February 1987, while on exercise in Scapa Flow with other members of the squadron, destroyed a German mine dating from the Second World War. While remaining part of the 3rd MCS, she was seconded to the Fishery Protection Squadron. She was paid off on 30 April 1991 and was broken up in Bruges from 1992.
