= HMS Hodgeston =

Minesweeper of the Royal Navy

History

United Kingdom
- Name: HMS Hodgeston
- Builder: Fleetlands Shipyard, Portsmouth
- Launched: 5 February 1954
- Renamed: HMS Northumbria between 1954 and 1960; HMS Venturer between 1961 and 1975
- Home port: 1954-1961 Gateshead, Newcastle Upon Tyne, UK; 1961-1975 Bristol UK; 1976-1985 Glasgow, Scotland, UK; 1985-1988 HM Naval Base, Rosyth, Inverkeithing, Scotland, UK
- Identification: Pennant number M1146
- Fate: Sold for scrapping in September 1988; Broken up at Bruges, Belgium in December 1988

General characteristics
- Class & type: Ton-class minesweeper
- Displacement: 440 long tons
- Length: 152 ft (46.3 m)
- Beam: 28 ft (8.5 m)
- Draught: 8 ft (2.4 m)
- Propulsion: Originally Mirrlees diesel, later Napier Deltic, producing 3,000 shp (2,200 kW) on each of two shafts
- Speed: 15 knots (28 km/h)
- Armament: 1 × Bofors 40 mm L/60 gun; 1 × Oerlikon 20 mm cannon; 1 × M2 Browning machine gun

HMS Hodgeston was a Ton-class minesweeper which saw service with the Royal Navy during the Cold War. Built by Fleetlands Shipyard, she was launched on 6 April 1954 and broken up in 1988.

== Construction and design ==
Hodgeston was ordered on 14 February 1952, was laid down at Fleetland Shipyard's Gosport yard on 22 September 1952, was launched on 6 April 1954 and commissioned on 17 December 1954.

She was 152 feet (46.33 m) long overall and 140 feet (42.67 m) between perpendiculars, with a beam of 28 feet 9 inches (8.76 m) and a draught of 8 feet 3 inches (2.51 m). Displacement was 360 long tons (370 t) normal and 425 long tons (432 t) deep load. Hodgeston was initially powered by a pair of 12-cylinder Mirrlees diesel engines, driving two shafts and giving a total of 2,500 shaft horsepower (1,900 kW), giving the ship a speed of 15 knots (17 mph; 28 km/h), but these were later replaced by two Napier Deltic engines, giving a total of 3,000 shaft horsepower (2,200 kW). 45 tons of fuel were carried, giving a range of 3,000 nautical miles (3,500 mi; 5,600 km) at 8 knots (9.2 mph; 15 km/h).

Armament consisted of a single Bofors 40 mm anti-aircraft gun forward and two Oerlikon 20 mm cannon aft. Minesweeping equipment included wire sweeps for sweeping moored contact mines and acoustic or magnetic sweeps for dealing with influence mines. The ship had a crew of 27 in peacetime and 39 in wartime.

== Service ==
Hodgeston spent many years attached to the 10th Mine Counter Measure (MCM10) Squadron manned by the Royal Naval Reserve (RNR).

Between 1954 and 1960 she was renamed HMS Northumbria whilst attached to the Tyne Division of the RNR HMS Calliope based at Gateshead. On 30 May 1955, Northumbria was in collision with the Cypriot ship Cyprian Prince off Newcastle upon Tyne and was holed. Cyprian Prince towed her into port. On 24 July 1960, Northumbria ran aground at Lindisfarne, Northumberland. Between 1961 and 1975 she was renamed HMS Venturer whilst attached as sea-going tender to the Severn Division of the RNR at HMS Flying Fox based in Bristol.

On 1 January 1976, the ship joined the South-West group of the 10th Mine Counter Measures Squadron, reverting to her original name Hodgeston. She attended the 1977 Silver Jubilee Fleet Review off Spithead when she was part of the 10th Mine Countermeasures Squadron. In 1979, she was attached to the Clyde division of the RNR, while later that year, she transferred to the Fishery Protection Squadron. On 21 June 1979, the commercial tanker Tarpenbek, carrying a load of lubricating oil, collided with the landing ship Sir Geraint off Selsey Bill in thick fog, holing the tanker. Hodgeston went to the assistance of Tarpenbek, and when the tanker capsized in heavy seas, helped to co-ordinate with salvage vessels, which managed to recover the oil, preventing major ecological damage, and salvaged the tanker, righting her by Parbucking. Later that summer, she went to the aid of the trawler Excellent, which had caught a mine in her nets, escorting the trawler to Penzance Bay where bomb disposal squads dealt with the mine.

On 23 June 1982 she was part of the North West group of the RNR, and was attached to the Clyde division again in 1983. She was de-commissioned in 1985 following the acquisition of the River-class minesweeper HMS Dovey as her successor as tender to HMS Graham.

Following this she spent time attached to the Fisheries Protection Squadron of the Royal Navy before being sold in September 1988. She was broken up at Bruges by 29 December 1988.

She is the only ship of the name to serve in the Royal Navy to date.

== Publications ==
- Blackman, Raymond V. B. (1962). Jane's Fighting Ships 1962–63. London: Sampson Low, Marston & Co. Ltd.
- Brown, D. K.; Moore, George (2012). Rebuilding the Royal Navy: Warship Design Since 1945. Barnsley, UK: Seaforth Publishing. ISBN 978-1-84832-150-2.
- Colledge, J. J.; Warlow, Ben (2006) [1969]. Ships of the Royal Navy: The Complete Record of All Fighting Ships of the Royal Navy from the 15th Century to the Present (3rd Rev ed.). London: Chatham Publishing. ISBN 978-1-86176-281-8. OCLC 67375475.
- Couhat, Jean Laybayle; Baker, A. D., eds. (1986). Combat Fleets of the World 1986/87: Their Ships, Aircraft and Armament. Annapolis, Maryland: Naval Institute Press. ISBN 0-85368-860-5.
- De La Rue, Colin; Anderson, Charles B. (2015). Shipping and the Environment (Second ed.). New York: Routledge. ISBN 978-1-843-11323-2.
- Gardiner, Robert; Chumbley, Stephen, eds. (1995). Conway's All The World's Fighting Ships 1947–1995. Annapolis, Maryland, USA: Naval Institute Press. ISBN 1-55750-132-7.
- Moore, John, ed. (1979). Jane's Fighting Ships 1979–80. London: Jane's Yearbooks. ISBN 0-354-00587-1.
- Worth, Jack (1984). British Warships Since 1945: Part 4: Minesweepers. Liskeard, UK: Maritime Books. ISBN 0-907771-12-2.
