= HMS Shoulton =

Minesweeper of the Royal Navy

History

United Kingdom
- Name: HMS Shoulton
- Ordered: 17 June 1952
- Builder: Montrose Dockyard
- Launched: 10 September 1954
- Decommissioned: 23 November 1979
- Fate: Sold for scrapping on 2 February 1981

General characteristics
- Class & type: Ton-class minesweeper
- Displacement: 440 tons
- Length: 152 ft (46 m)
- Beam: 28 ft (8.5 m)
- Draught: 8 ft (2.4 m)
- Propulsion: Originally Mirrlees diesel, later Napier Deltic, producing 3,000 shp (2,200 kW) on each of two shafts
- Speed: 15 knots (28 km/h)
- Complement: 33
- Armament: 1 × Bofors 40 mm L/60 gun; 1 × Oerlikon 20 mm cannon; 1 × M2 Browning machine gun

HMS Shoulton (M1182) was a Ton-class minesweeper of the Royal Navy. Constructed by the Montrose Shipyard in Montrose, Scotland and launched on 10 September 1954, the minesweeper was converted into a prototype minehunter in 1957. The vessel was used as a test bed in the mid-1960s for new propulsion technologies. Shoulton was among the vessels assigned to salvage operations following the Aer Lingus Flight 712 crash off Rosslare. In 1977, Shoulton took part in the naval review marking the Silver Jubilee of Elizabeth II and was paid off on 23 November 1979. The ship was sold for scrap in 1981 and broken up at broken up in Blyth.

== Construction and design ==
Shoulton was ordered on 17 June 1952 and was launched at Montrose Shipyard, Montrose, Scotland on 10 September 1954. She was completed on 16 November 1955, commissioning with the pennant number M1182.

Shoulton was 152 feet (46.33 m) long overall and 140 feet (42.67 m) between perpendiculars, with a beam of 28 feet 9 inches (8.76 m) and a draught of 8 feet 3 inches (2.51 m). Displacement was 360 long tons (370 t) normal and 425 long tons (432 t) deep load. Like all the Ton class, the ship had an aluminium-framed wooden hull. She was powered by a pair of Napier Deltic diesel engines which drove two shafts, giving a total of 3,000 shaft horsepower (2,200 kW) and a speed of 15 knots (28 km/h; 17 mph). 45 tons of fuel were carried, giving a range of 3,000 nautical miles (5,600 km; 3,500 mi) at 8 knots (15 km/h; 9.2 mph).

Armament consisted of a single Bofors 40 mm anti-aircraft gun forward and two Oerlikon 20 mm cannon aft. Minesweeping equipment included wire sweeps for sweeping moored contact mines and acoustic or magnetic sweeps for dealing with influence mines. Unlike earlier ships of the class, Shoulton was fitted with an enclosed bridge.

== Service ==
In 1957, Shouton was converted into a prototype minehunter by Vosper Thornycroft at their Woolston, Southampton works. In November 1960, Shouton was part of the 50th Mine Sweeping Squadron and in July 1963 joined the First Minesweeping Squadron (Note: The First Minehunting Squadron according to the Ton Class Association.) as the Senior Officer's ship. From 1965 to 1967, Shouton was refitted with a prototype pump-jet propulsor. The installation was successful, proving resistant to damage (managing to survive a railway sleeper entering the pump-jet without damage to the propulsor), and paved the way for pump-jets being used on the Royal Navy's nuclear submarines. Shoulton together with sister ships Clarbeston and Invermoriston, took part in salvage operations following the crash of an Aer Lingus Vickers Viscount airliner off Rosslare.

On 28 July 1977, Shoulton took part in the Review of the Fleet at Spithead commemorating the Silver Jubilee of Elizabeth II as part of the 3rd Mine Countermeasures Squadron (3rd MCMS). She transferred to the 2nd Mine Countermeasures Squadron (2 MCMS) in January 1979 and paid off for the last time at Portsmouth on 23 November 1979.

Shoulton was sold for scrapping on 2 February 1981 and was broken up in Blyth from 17 April 1981.
