= HMS Kirkliston =

Minesweeper of the Royal Navy

History

United Kingdom
- Name: Kirkliston
- Builder: Harland & Wolff
- Yard number: 1518
- Launched: 18 February 1954
- Completed: 21 August 1954
- Decommissioned: 2 December 1985
- Identification: Pennant number: M1157
- Fate: Sold for scrap, 20 October 1991

General characteristics
- Class & type: Ton-class minesweeper
- Displacement: 440 tons
- Length: 152 ft (46 m)
- Beam: 28 ft (8.5 m)
- Draught: 8 ft (2.4 m)
- Propulsion: Originally Mirrlees diesel, later Napier Deltic, producing 3,000 shp (2,200 kW) on each of two shafts
- Speed: 15 knots (28 km/h; 17 mph)
- Complement: 33
- Armament: 1 × Bofors 40 mm Automatic Gun L/60; 1 × Oerlikon 20 mm cannon; 1 × M2 Browning machine gun

HMS Kirkliston (M1157) was a Ton-class minesweeper of the Royal Navy, built by Harland & Wolff and launched on 18 February 1954. In a brief episode from 1956 to 1960 she was temporarily renamed HMS Kilmorey and was assigned to the Ulster division Royal Naval Reserve (RNR).

== Construction and design ==
Kirkliston was ordered on 22 March 1952, was launched at Harland & Wolff's Belfast shipyard on 18 February 1954 and completed on 21 August 1954.

She was 152 feet (46.33 m) long overall and 140 feet (42.67 m) between perpendiculars, with a beam of 28 feet 9 inches (8.76 m) and a draught of 8 feet 3 inches (2.51 m). Displacement was 360 long tons (370 t) normal and 425 long tons (432 t) deep load. Kirliston was initially powered by a pair of 12-cylinder Mirrlees diesel engine, driving two shafts and giving a total of 2,500 shaft horsepower (1,900 kW), giving the ship a speed of 15 knots (17 mph; 28 km/h). (Note: Later Tons, beginning with Highburton, completed in June 1955, were powered by two Napier Deltic engines, giving a total of 3,000 shaft horsepower (2,200 kW).) 45 tons of fuel were carried, giving a range of 3,000 nautical miles (3,500 mi; 5,600 km) at 8 knots (9.2 mph; 15 km/h).

Armament consisted of a single Bofors 40 mm anti-aircraft gun forward and two Oerlikon 20 mm cannon aft. Minesweeping equipment included wire sweeps for sweeping moored contact mines and acoustic or magnetic sweeps for dealing with influence mines. The ship had a crew of 27 in peacetime and 39 in wartime.

== Service ==
On 14 August 1956, Kirkliston served with the Ulster Division of the Royal Navy Reserve (RNR), and as such, was temporarily renamed Kilmorey, until replaced by sister-ship Alfriston in July 1960, when Kirkliston resumed her original name. From November 1962 to June 1964 she was converted to a minehunter at Portsmouth Dockyard. Her magnetic sweep gear was removed and Type 193 Sonar was fitted to allow mines to be detected so that divers could destroy the mine. She then joined the 4th Mine Countermeasures Squadron at Port Edgar. From 1966 (Note: From 1969 according to Worth.) she saw service in the Far East as part of the 6th Mine Countermeasures Squadron based at Hong Kong. On 16 August 1971, Typhoon Rose struck Hong Kong. Kirkliston and the other two minesweepers of the 6th Mine Countermeasures Squadron, Bossington and Hubberston took part in rescue operations following the Typhoon. Kirleston rescued 40 survivors from stranded ships, including the only four survivors from the Hong Kong–Macau ferry Fat Shan, which had foundered off Lantau Island, killing 88 passengers and crew. In 1972 she returned to British waters, joining the First Mine Countermeasures Squadron, again at Port Edgar.

In 1973 Kirkliston was refitted at Gibraltar, and following the refit served for six months with the Forth Division of the RNR, being the first minehunter operated by the RNR, before joining the 2nd Mine Countermeasures Squadron based at Portsmouth. From August to December 1975 she was part of STANAVFORCHAN (Standing Naval Force Channel). In 1977 she was used to evaluate equipment planned for the Hunt-class mine countermeasures vessels. HMS Kirkliston was decommissioned on 2 December 1985 and was sold for scrap on 20 October 1991.
