= HMS Kellington =

Ton-class minesweeper of the Royal Navy

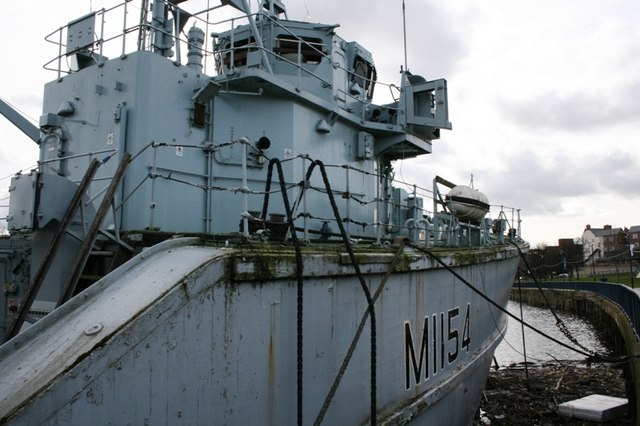
- TS Kellington, moored on the River Tees, 2007

History

United Kingdom
- Name: HMS Kellington
- Builder: Pickersgill, Sunderland
- Launched: 12 October 1954
- Out of service: Handed over to Sea Cadets on 23 August 1993
- Fate: Scrapped in 2009

General characteristics
- Class & type: Ton-class minesweeper
- Displacement: 440 tons
- Length: 152 ft (46.3 m)
- Beam: 28 ft (8.5 m)
- Draught: 8 ft (2.4 m)
- Propulsion: Originally Mirrlees diesel, later Napier Deltic, producing 3,000 shp (2,200 kW) on each of two shafts
- Speed: 15 knots (28 km/h; 17 mph)
- Armament: 1 × Bofors 40 mm L/60 gun; 1 × Oerlikon 20 mm cannon; 1 × M2 Browning machine gun

HMS Kellington (M1154) was a Ton-class minesweeper of the Royal Navy, launched on 12 October 1954 and named after the village of Kellington in North Yorkshire.

She served as part of 108th mine sweeping squadron based at Malta in 1956, and in January 1957 arrived back in Hythe to join the reserve fleet.

She was converted to a minehunter between 1967 and 1969.

She was decommissioned in 1993 and was handed over to become a training ship for the Sea Cadets on 23 August 1993. She was moored on the River Tees at Stockton on Tees in County Durham. She was purchased outright on 9 February 1999, but closed due to health and safety reasons in 2005.

She was broken up in situ by Able UK in 2009.
