= HMS Kemerton =

Minesweeper of the Royal Navy

History

United Kingdom
- Name: Kemerton
- Namesake: Kemerton
- Builder: Harland & Wolff
- Yard number: 1517
- Launched: 27 November 1953
- Completed: 21 May 1954
- Identification: Pennant number: M1156
- Fate: Scrapped, 1975

General characteristics
- Class & type: Ton-class minesweeper
- Displacement: 440 tons
- Length: 152 ft (46 m)
- Beam: 28 ft (8.5 m)
- Draught: 8 ft (2.4 m)
- Propulsion: Originally Mirrlees diesel, later Napier Deltic, producing 3,000 shp (2,200 kW) on each of two shafts
- Speed: 15 knots (28 km/h; 17 mph)
- Complement: 33
- Armament: 1 × Bofors 40 mm L/60 gun; 1 × Oerlikon 20 mm cannon; 1 × M2 Browning machine gun

HMS Kemerton (M1156) was a Ton-class minesweeper of the Royal Navy, launched on 27 November 1953 and named after the village of Kemerton in Gloucestershire. She was put 'Operational Reserve' at Hythe from 1956 to 1962, before being sent to the Persian Gulf as part of the 9th Minesweeper Squadron. She was broken up in 1975 at Poole.
