= SAS Walvisbaai =

Minesweeper completed in 1959

History

United Kingdom
- Name: Packington
- Namesake: Packington
- Builder: Harland & Wolff, Belfast
- Launched: 3 July 1958
- Completed: 21 May 1959
- Fate: Sold to the South African Navy before commissioning

South Africa
- Name: Walvisbaai
- Namesake: Walvis Bay
- Acquired: 20 September 1959
- Decommissioned: March 2001
- Fate: Sold to the Walt Disney Co., 2003; later sold to private interests.

Panama
- Name: Mojo
- Acquired: 2006
- Status: In service
- Notes: Converted to a yacht from 2006-2012

General characteristics
- Class & type: Ton-class minesweeper
- Displacement: 360 long tons (370 t) (standard); 440 t (430 long tons) (deep load)
- Length: 153 ft (46.6 m)
- Beam: 27 ft 7 in (8.4 m)
- Draught: 8 ft 2 in (2.5 m)
- Installed power: 2 × 3,000 bhp (2,237 kW) diesel engines
- Propulsion: 2 × propeller shafts
- Speed: 15 knots (28 km/h; 17 mph)
- Range: 2,300 nmi (4,300 km; 2,600 mi) at 13 knots (24 km/h; 15 mph)
- Complement: 32
- Armament: 1 x Bofors 40 mm gun

HMS Packington (pennant number: M1214) was a Ton-class minesweeper completed in 1959 by Harland & Wolff for the Royal Navy, but transferred before commissioning to the South African Navy as SAS Walvisbaai. The ship was decommissioned in March 2001 and was sold to the Walt Disney Company in 2003 to be used in the Wes Anderson film The Life Aquatic with Steve Zissou.

Post filming the vessel was sold and was subsequently converted into a private yacht.

== Design and description ==
The Ton-class coastal minesweepers were constructed with wooden hulls and almost all of their structure was made from aluminium to reduce their magnetic signature to aid sweeping magnetic mines. The ships displaced 360 long tons (370 t) at standard load and 1,940 long tons (1,970 t) at deep load. They had a length between perpendiculars of 153 feet (46.6 m), a beam of 27 feet 7 inches (8.4 m) and a draught of 8 feet 2 inches (2.5 m). The Tons were powered by two Napier Deltic diesel engines, each driving one propeller shaft. The engines developed a total of 6,000 brake horsepower (4,500 kW) and gave a maximum speed of 15 knots (28 km/h; 17 mph). They had a range of 2,300 nautical miles (4,300 km; 2,600 mi) at 13 knots (24 km/h; 15 mph) and had a complement of 4 officers and 25 ratings. The Ton-class ships were armed with a single 40-millimeter (1.6 in) Bofors and two 20-millimeter (0.8 in) Oerlikon light AA guns on a single twin-gun mount.

== Construction and career ==
Packington was launched by Harland & Wolff on 3 July 1958 at their Belfast shipyard. She was transferred to the South African Navy before she was commissioned on 20 September 1959 under the name of SAS Walvisbaai. The ship was retired in March 2001 and sold to the Walt Disney Company in 2003 to be used as the R/V Belafonte in the Wes Anderson film The Life Aquatic with Steve Zissou.

Subsequently, she was sold to a private owner for $350,000. In 2006 she began a lengthy conversion into a yacht in Dubai that saw her engines replaced by a pair of 1,750 bhp (1,300 kW) V-12 Caterpillar 3512B diesel engines, her deck renewed and her interior completely revamped. The work was completed by 2012 and the ship was renamed Mojo.
