= Speculation (disambiguation) =

Speculation, in finance, is the purchase of an asset with the hope that it will become more valuable in the future.

Speculation(s) may also refer to:

- Speculative fiction, an umbrella term for imaginative fiction genres, especially science fiction
- Speculative reason, also called theoretical reason or pure reason
- Continental philosophy, an academic term to categorize several schools of speculative thought
- Speculation (card game), a gambling game popular around the turn of the nineteenth century
- Speculations (book), a 1982 anthology of science fiction short stories
- Speculations (magazine), a defunct writers resource magazine for the speculative fiction subgenre

== See also ==
- Speculative (disambiguation)
- Speculator (disambiguation)
