= LÉ Banba =

- Silhouette of LÉ Banba (CM11)

History

United Kingdom
- Name: HMS Alverton
- Namesake: Alverton
- Builder: Thornycroft
- Launched: 24 March 1954
- Identification: M1104
- Fate: Sold to Ireland, February 1971

Ireland
- Name: LÉ Banba
- Namesake: Banba
- Acquired: 21 February 1971
- Commissioned: 23 February 1971
- Decommissioned: 1984
- Identification: CM11
- Fate: Sold to Spanish interests for breaking

General characteristics
- Class & type: Ton-class minesweeper
- Displacement: 425 tonnes (max)
- Length: 42.67 m (140.0 ft) overall
- Beam: 8.4 m (28 ft)
- Draught: 2.49 m (8 ft 2 in)
- Speed: 15 knots (28 km/h; 17 mph) maximum
- Complement: 30
- Armament: 40 mm/60 Bofors; 2 × 20 mm Oerlikon AA

LÉ Banba (CM11) was a Ton-class minesweeper in the Irish Naval Service (INS) and was one of three purchased by the Irish government to replace the three Flower Class Corvettes purchased in 1946. The other two were Grainne and Fola.

LÉ Banba was named after Banba, a legendary queen of the Tuatha Dé Danann and also a poetic name for Ireland. The ship was the former Royal Navy vessel HMS Alverton.

== Handover ==
The name Banba was originally allocated to be borne by one of the six Flower-class corvettes ordered in 1946, but only three were delivered and the name was not used. On 22 February 1971, the former Alverton was handed over to the INS, and commissioned on 23 February by Lt. Cdr. Deasy at Gibraltar.

Following her commissioning, Banba, in company with Fola, worked up in the Western Mediterranean so that they could complete Harbour Acceptance Trials and Sea Acceptance Trials. On 20 March both ships left the Mediterranean for home, however on the way a storm blew up forcing them to take refuge in Lisbon. The two newest additions to the Navy finally arrived on 29 March 1971.

In 1984 Banba was decommissioned and sold on to Spanish interests for breaking.
