= Xin Beijing =

Container ship built in 2007

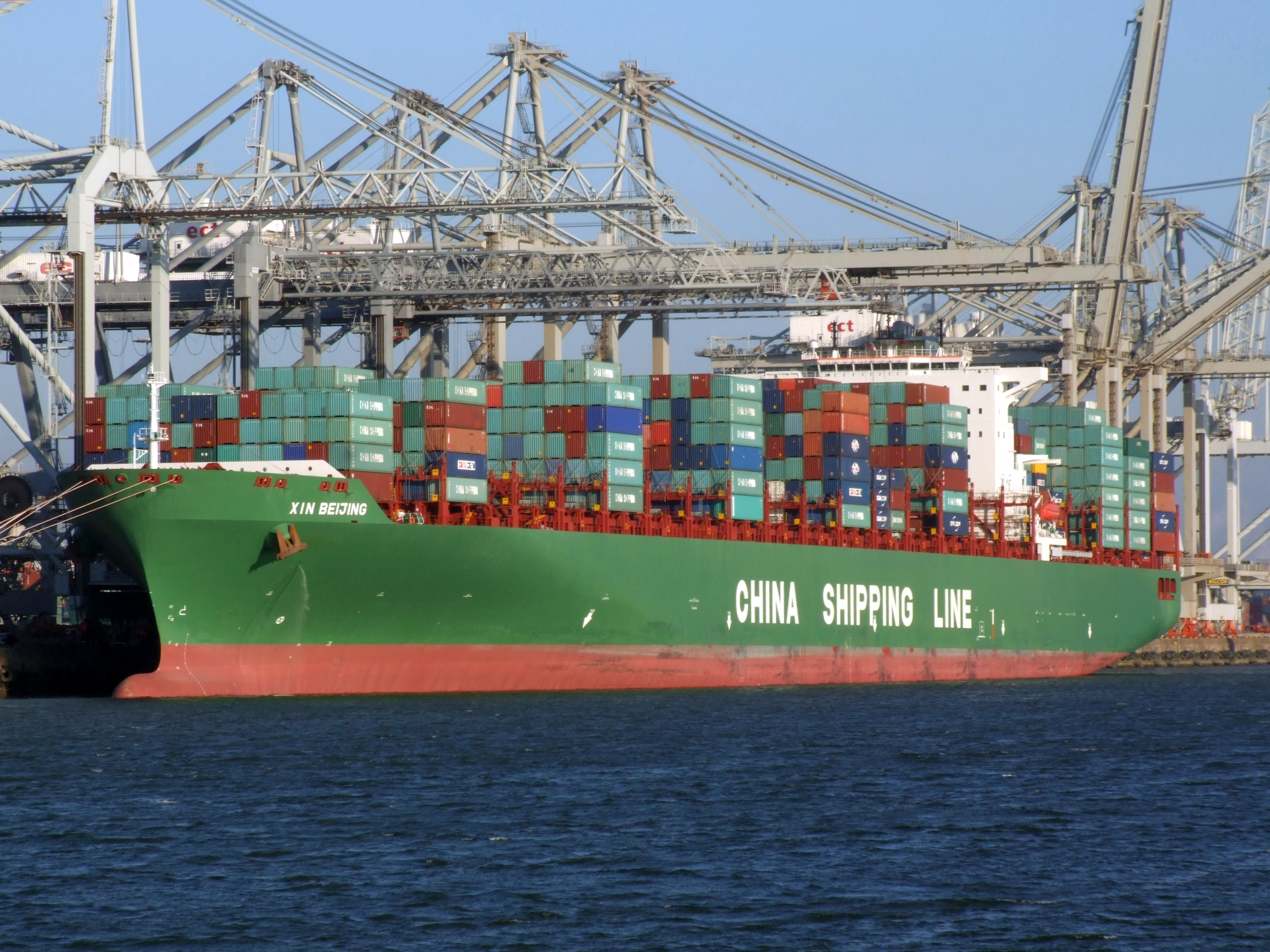
- Xin Beijing at the Amazone harbour, Port of Rotterdam

History
- Name: Xin Beijing
- Owner: Yangshan D Shipping Company Ltd
- Operator: China International Ship Management Company (CISM)
- Port of registry: Hong Kong, Hong Kong
- Builder: Samsung Heavy Industries
- Yard number: 1567
- Launched: 10 February 2007
- Completed: April 2007
- Identification: IMO number: 9314246; Call Sign: VRCS5; MMSI number: 477768100; Official No: HK-1882
- Status: In service

General characteristics
- Class & type: Boxship
- Tonnage: 102200dwt
- Length: 337m
- Beam: 46m
- Draught: 15m
- Depth: 27m
- Installed power: 68,520 kW(93,160 hp)
- Propulsion: 1 oil engine
- Speed: 25kn
- Crew: 23

Xin Beijing is a large container ship owned by the Yangshan D Shipping Company.

== Hull and engine ==
Xin Beijing was built by Samsung Heavy Industries in yard 1567 and was completed in April 2007. It is a fully cellular container ship with 9 holds, with a total carrying capacity of 9572 TEU. The ship is 337m in length and 46m across the beam. The ship type is dry cargo.

The vessel is powered by a MAN B&W 12K98MC-C engine, capable of producing 68,520 kW (93,160 hp) driving 1 propeller. This 2 stroke, 12 cylinder engine was built by Doosan Engine in Changwan. When constructed, the vessel utilized four 2,750 kW auxiliary generators.

== Previous owners ==
- China Shipping Container Lines
