= HMAS Ibis (M 1183) =

History

United Kingdom
- Name: Singleton
- Builder: Montrose Shipyard
- Launched: 18 November 1955
- Fate: Sold to Australia

Australia
- Name: Ibis
- Acquired: 1961
- Commissioned: 7 September 1962
- Decommissioned: 4 May 1984
- Motto: "Safe Waters"
- Honours and awards: Battle honours: Malaysia 1964–66; Plus one inherited battle honour
- Fate: Sold in 1985 to be broken up
- Badge

General characteristics
- Class & type: Ton-class minesweeper
- Displacement: 440 tons
- Length: 152 ft (46 m)
- Beam: 28 ft (8.5 m)
- Draught: 8 ft (2.4 m)
- Propulsion: Originally Mirrlees diesel, later Napier Deltic, producing 3,000 shp (2,200 kW) on each of two shafts
- Speed: 15 knots (28 km/h; 17 mph)
- Complement: 33
- Armament: 2 × Bofors 40 mm Automatic Gun L/60; 1 × M2 Browning machine gun

HMAS Ibis (M 1183) was a Ton-class minesweeper built by the Montrose Shipyard, launched on 18 November 1955, and commissioned into the Royal Navy as HMS Singleton.

The ship was purchased by Australia in 1961, and commissioned into the Royal Australian Navy as HMAS Ibis on 7 September 1962.

During the mid-1960s, Ibis was one of several ships operating in support of the Malaysian government during the Indonesia-Malaysia Confrontation. This service was later recognised with the battle honour "Malaysia 1964–66".

Ibis was decommissioned on 4 May 1984.
