= HMAS Teal =

1955 Ton-class minesweeper

Coordinates: 35.3430573°N 33.3318553°E

History

United Kingdom
- Name: Jackton
- Builder: Philip and Son, Dartmouth
- Launched: 28 February 1955
- Fate: Sold to Australia

Australia
- Name: Teal
- Acquired: 1961
- Commissioned: 30 August 1962
- Decommissioned: 14 August 1970
- Motto: "Safe Waters"
- Honours and awards: Battle honours: Malaysia 1964–66
- Status: Training ship under University of Kyrenia, Girne
- Badge

General characteristics
- Class & type: Ton-class minesweeper
- Displacement: 440 tons
- Length: 152 ft (46 m)
- Beam: 28 ft (8.5 m)
- Draught: 8 ft (2.4 m)
- Propulsion: Originally Mirrlees diesel, later Napier Deltic, producing 3,000 shp (2,200 kW) on each of two shafts
- Speed: 15 knots (28 km/h; 17 mph)
- Complement: 33
- Armament: 1 × Bofors 40 mm Automatic Gun L/60; 1 × Oerlikon 20 mm cannon; 1 × M2 Browning machine gun

HMAS Teal (M 1152) (formerly HMS Jackton) was a Ton-class minesweeper operated by the Royal Navy (RN) and the Royal Australian Navy (RAN).

== Construction ==
The vessel was built by Philip and Son, Dartmouth and launched on 28 February 1955, and commissioned into the Royal Navy as HMS Jackton.

== Operational history ==
=== Australia ===
The ship was purchased by the RAN in 1961, and was commissioned as HMAS Teal on 30 August 1962.

During the mid-1960s, Teal was one of several ships operating in support of the Malaysian government during the Indonesia-Malaysia Confrontation. On 13 December 1964 HMAS Teal intercepted two Indonesian sampans off Raffles Light in the south western corner of the Singapore Strait. One sampan opened fire when illuminated by Teal's Signal Lamp. Teal retaliated, killing three of the sampan's crew and the remainder of the enemy surrendered. One was an officer of the Indonesian Navy and the sampan was found to be carrying a quantity of explosives, weapons and other military equipment. This service was later recognised with the battle honour "Malaysia 1964–66".

== Decommissioning and fate ==
HMAS Teal paid off on 14 August 1970. Teal was sold to Ian and Gary Baker, Tasmania. The vessel was transported to Tasmania where she was later sold.

In 1994 Teal became a research and training ship for the maritime faculties of Near East University and the University of Kyrenia, in Northern Cyprus. On 11 September 2022, the ship was given a new berth in the port of Kyrenia, to become a maritime museum.

== Bibliography ==
- Sowdon, Dave (February 2022). "Heads Up & Look Astern". Marine News Supplement: Warships. 76 (2): S170. ISSN 0966-6958.
