= Speculator (disambiguation) =

A speculator is one who engages in speculation.

It may also refer to:

- Speculatores (sgl. speculator), members of the Roman Army
- Speculator (video game), released in 1985
- Speculator, New York, United States

== See also ==
- Speculator Mine disaster, United States, 1917
- Field goal (rugby), also known as a speculator
- Spéculateur, French ship launched in 1806
