= HMS Wilton (M1116) =

Minesweeper of the Royal Navy

Coordinates: 51.5385083°N 0.6590483°E

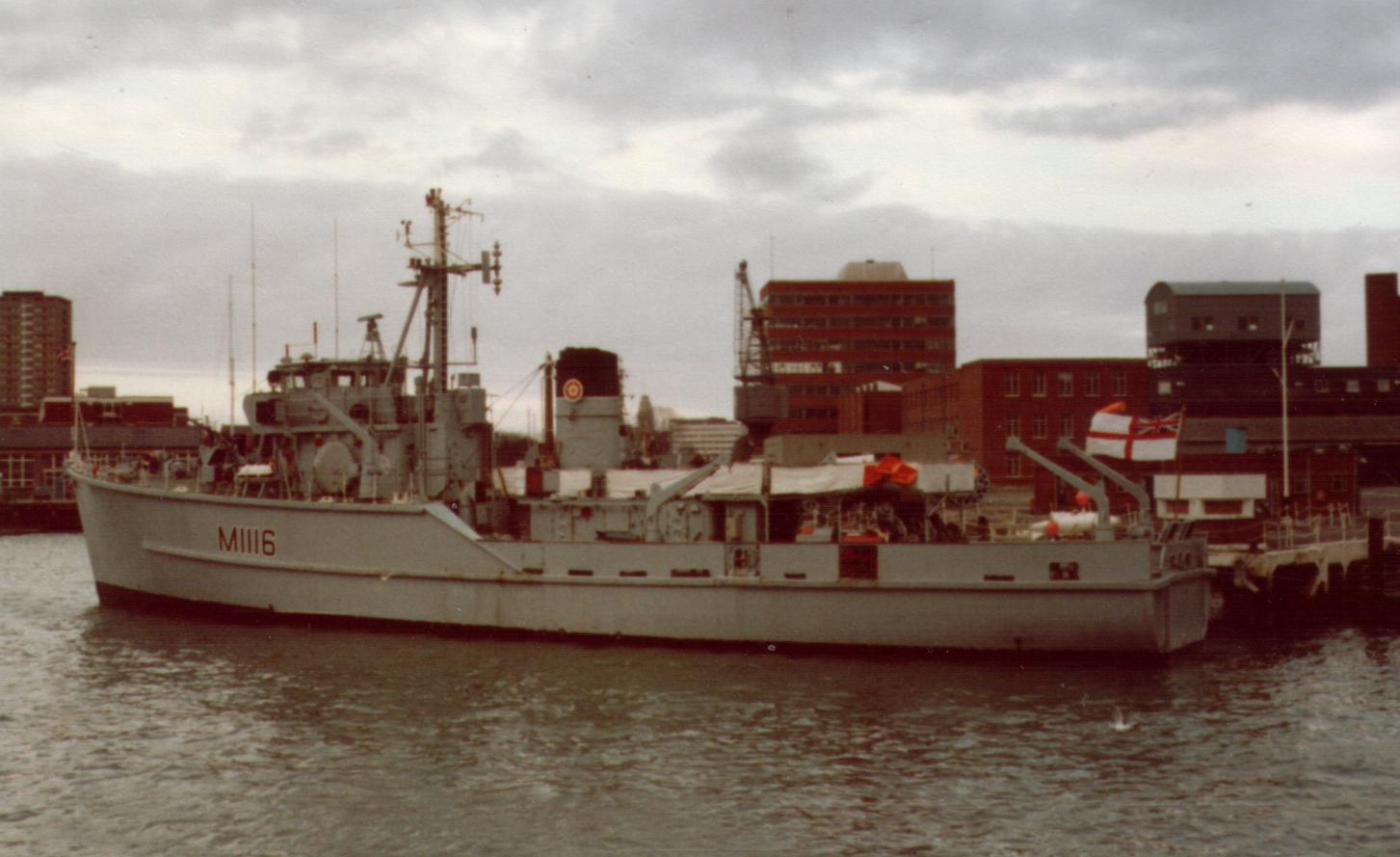
- Wilton at Portsmouth, 1981

History

United Kingdom
- Name: Wilton
- Ordered: 11 February 1970
- Builder: Vosper Thornycroft, Woolston
- Laid down: 7 August 1970
- Launched: 18 January 1972
- Commissioned: 14 July 1973
- Decommissioned: 1994
- Identification: Pennant number: M1116
- Fate: Preserved at Leigh-on-Sea since 2001

General characteristics
- Class & type: Wilton-class minesweeper
- Displacement: 450 tons
- Length: 153 ft (47 m)
- Beam: 29.2 ft (8.9 m)
- Draught: 8.5 ft (2.6 m)
- Propulsion: 2 × Napier Deltic 18-7A diesel engines at 3,000 bhp (2,200 kW)
- Speed: 16 knots (30 km/h; 18 mph)
- Range: 2,300 nmi (4,300 km; 2,600 mi) at 13 knots (24 km/h; 15 mph)
- Complement: 37
- Armament: 1 × Bofors 40 mm gun

HMS Wilton (M1116) was a prototype coastal minesweeper/minehunter for the Royal Navy. She was the first warship in the world to be constructed from glass-reinforced plastic (GRP). Her design was based upon the existing Ton-class minesweepers, and she was fitted with equipment recovered from the scrapped HMS Derriton. The use of GRP gave the vessel a low magnetic signature against the threat of magnetic mines.

On commissioning, Wilton joined the 2nd Mine Counter Measures Squadron (2nd MCMS) based at Portsmouth. In 1974, she took part in Operation Rheostat, the Royal Navy's part of the international efforts to clear the Suez Canal of mines. In November that year, Wilton rejoined 2nd MCMS, interrupting her service with that squadron to be seconded to NATO's Standing Naval Force Channel (STANAVFORCHAN) in 1977 and 1980. Wilton took part in the Silver Jubilee Review at Spithead on 28 June 1977. On 31 August 1979 Wilton was involved in an accident when she collided with BNS Breydel off Ostende.

Wilton was unofficially known as HMS Tupperware, HMS Indestructible, and "The Plastic Duck" or "Plastic Pig".

She was retired by the Royal Navy in 1994; she ended up in store until being sold in August 2001, when she was fitted out as the new home of the Essex Yacht Club at Leigh-on-Sea on the Thames Estuary.
