= HMS Iveston =

Former Royal Navy ship

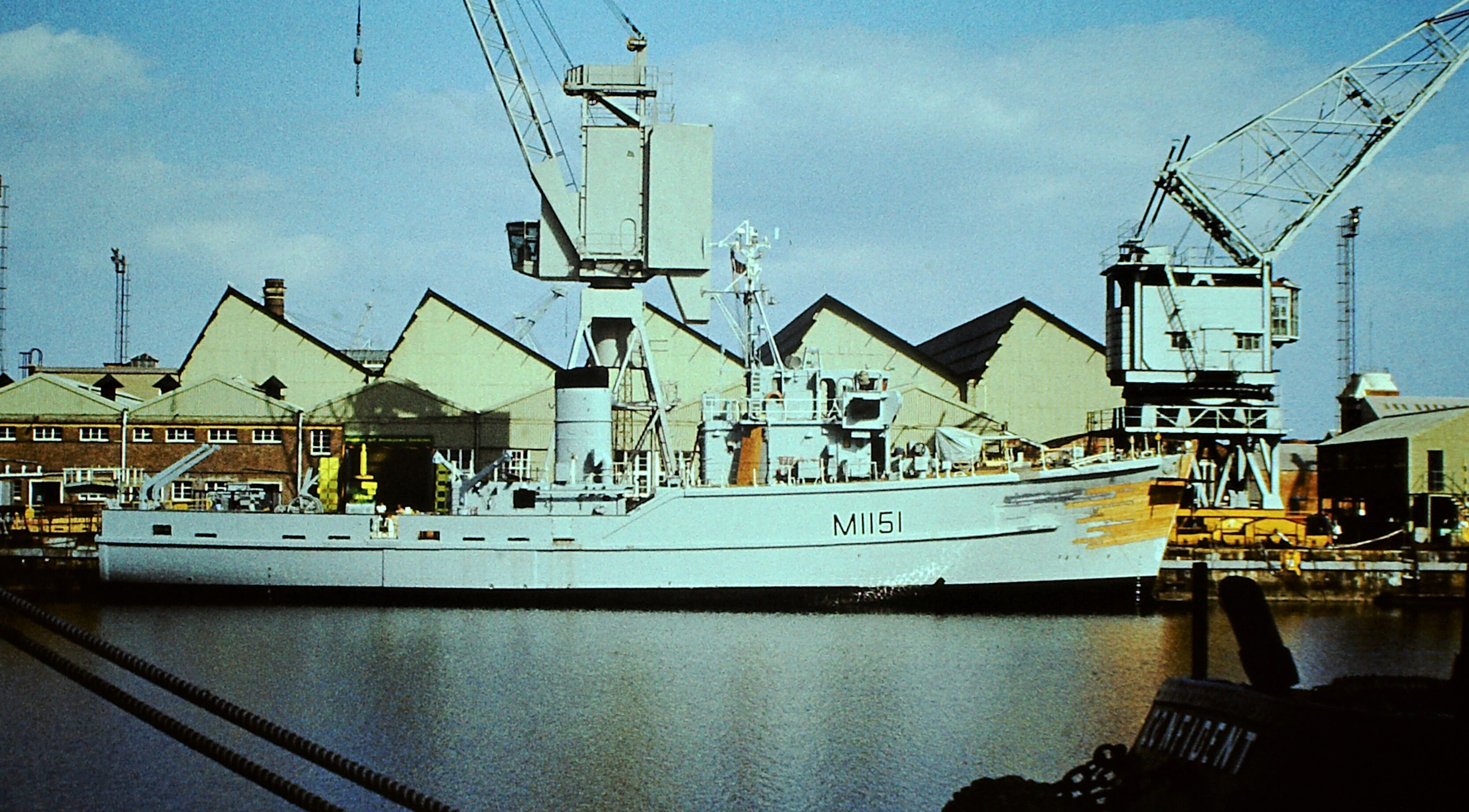
- HMS Ivseton in Portsmouth (1980)

History

United Kingdom
- Name: HMS Iveston
- Namesake: English village of Iveston
- Builder: Philip and Son
- Launched: 1 June 1954
- Completed: 29 June 1955
- Decommissioned: 1992
- Out of service: Transferred as the SCC training ship T.S. Iveston - broken up at Erith in March 2015

General characteristics
- Class & type: Ton-class minesweeper
- Displacement: 360 tons
- Length: 152 ft (46 m)
- Beam: 28 ft (8.5 m)
- Draught: 8 ft (2.4 m)
- Propulsion: 2 Paxman Deltic 18A-7A diesel engines
- Speed: 15 kn (28 km/h)
- Range: 2,500 nmi (4,600 km) at 12 kn (22 km/h)
- Armament: 1 × Bofors 40 mm/60 Mk 3 dual-purpose gun; 2 × 20 mm Oerlikon guns; 3 × FN 7.62 mm machine-guns

HMS Iveston was a Ton-class minesweeper of the Royal Navy launched on 1 June 1954 by Philip and Son in Dartmouth. After her decommissioning in 1992, HMS Iveston became the Sea Cadet training ship T.S. Iveston. She was sold and scrapped in March 2015.

== Construction and design ==
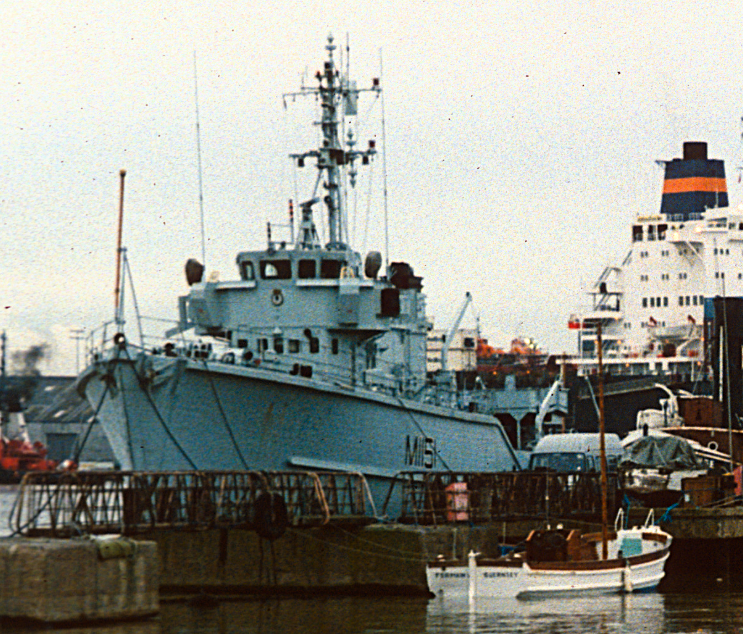
HAMS Iveston in Tilbury (1999)

Iveston was ordered on 19 March 1952, was laid down at Philip and Son's Dartmouth yard on 22 October 1952, was launched on 1 June 1954 and completed on 29 June 1955.

She was 152 feet (46.33 m) long overall and 140 feet (42.67 m) between perpendiculars, with a beam of 28 feet 9 inches (8.76 m) and a draught of 8 feet 3 inches (2.51 m). Displacement was 360 long tons (370 t) normal and 425 long tons (432 t) deep load. As built, Iveston was powered by two Mirrlees diesel engines, giving a total of 2,500 shaft horsepower (1,900 kW). These engines gave a speed of 15 knots (17 mph; 28 km/h). 45 tons of fuel were carried, giving a range of 3,000 nautical miles (3,500 mi; 5,600 km) at 8 knots (9.2 mph; 15 km/h).

Armament consisted of a single Bofors 40 mm anti-aircraft gun forward and two Oerlikon 20 mm cannon aft. Minesweeping equipment included wire sweeps for sweeping moored contact mines and acoustic or magnetic sweeps for dealing with influence mines. The ship had a crew of 27 in peacetime and 39 in wartime.

== Service ==
From 1956 to 1962 Iveston was laid up in operational reserve at Hythe, near Southampton. On 3 January 1963 she was towed to Devonport dockyard where she was refitted and converted to a minehunter. Her magnetic sweep gear was removed and Type 193 Sonar was fitted to detect mines which could then be destroyed by divers while active rudders incorporating electric motors were fitted to aid slow speed manoeuvrability, and the ship's engines replaced by two Napier Deltic diesel engines rated at 3,000 brake horsepower (2,200 kW). She was recommissioned on 16 October 1964, joining the 1st Mine Counter Measures Squadron based at Port Edgar on the Firth of Forth.

== Mutiny ==
There was a mutiny on board HMS Iveston at Ullapool on 5 July 1970. This was the most recent mutiny in the Royal Navy. Five of the crew were tried by court martial at Rosyth and convicted. The group were sentenced to detention for terms ranging from 12 to 21 months, and dismissed from the Royal Navy "with disgrace". One of the ratings was convicted of an additional charge of striking a superior officer

== Sea Cadet use ==
T.S. Iveston arrived at Tilbury on August 28, 1993 under tow by the tug TOWING WIZARD (IMO: 5287823) and was berthed in the Tilbury Docks for use by the Sea Cadet Corps as a training base mostly by Thurrock Sea Cadets but also by Sea Cadets from Essex, Greater London and Southern and Eastern areas between 1993 and 2014. The training available encompassed marine engineering, seamanship, canoeing, pulling, sailing, powerboating, cook/steward and instructors’ courses.

Due to health and safety requirements plus the increasing costs to maintain the structural and internal integrity of the vessel Thurrock Sea Cadets were unable to keep her and in March 2015 the vessel was sold to a breakers yard at Erith on the River Thames.
