= LÉ Fola =

History

United Kingdom
- Name: HMS Blaxton
- Namesake: Village of Blaxton, Doncaster
- Launched: 21 June 1955
- Fate: Transferred to Irish Naval Service

Ireland
- Name: LÉ Fola
- Namesake: Fóla, a legendary queen of the Tuatha Dé Danann
- Acquired: 22 February 1971
- Commissioned: 23 February 1971
- Decommissioned: 1987
- Identification: CM12
- Fate: Sold for scrap

General characteristics
- Class & type: Ton-class minesweeper
- Displacement: 360 tonnes
- Length: 42.67 m (140.0 ft) overall
- Beam: 8.4 m (28 ft)
- Draught: 2.49 m (8 ft 2 in)
- Speed: 28 km/h (15 kn) maximum
- Complement: 30
- Armament: 2 × 40 mm/60 Bofors; 2 × 20 mm Oerlikon AA

LÉ Fola (CM12) was a Ton-class minesweeper of the Irish Naval Service.

Launched in 1955 as HMS Blaxton (M1132) for the Royal Navy (RN), the minesweeper was transferred to the Irish Naval Service on 22 February 1971, and renamed after Fóla, a legendary queen of the Tuatha Dé Danann and a poetic name for Ireland.

The minehunter remained in service until 1987, when she was sold for breaking.

== Irish Naval Service ==
HMS Blaxton was handed over to the Irish Naval Service on 22 February 1971. Together with Banba (previously HMS Alverton), the newly acquired vessel was commissioned as Fola the next day.

Following her commissioning, Fola in company with Banba, worked up in the Western Mediterranean so that they could complete Harbour Acceptance Trials and Sea Acceptance Trials. On 20 March both ships left the Mediterranean for home, however on the way a storm blew up forcing them to take refuge in Lisbon. The two newest additions to the Navy finally arrived on 29 March 1971, and were used for training and fisheries protection.

== Decommissioning and fate ==
In 1987, Fola was decommissioned and sold to Spanish interests for breaking.
