= HMAS Ibis =

Two ships of the Royal Australian Navy have been named HMAS Ibis:

- A requisitioned vessel operated during World War II
- HMAS Ibis (M 1183), a Ton-class minesweeper acquired from the Royal Navy in 1969, and operated until 1984

== Battle honours ==
Ships named HMAS Ibis are entitled to carry two battle honours:

- Darwin 1942–43
- Malaysia 1964
