= HMAS Curlew =

Ton-class minesweeper

Coordinates: 43.0494718°S 147.2689018°E

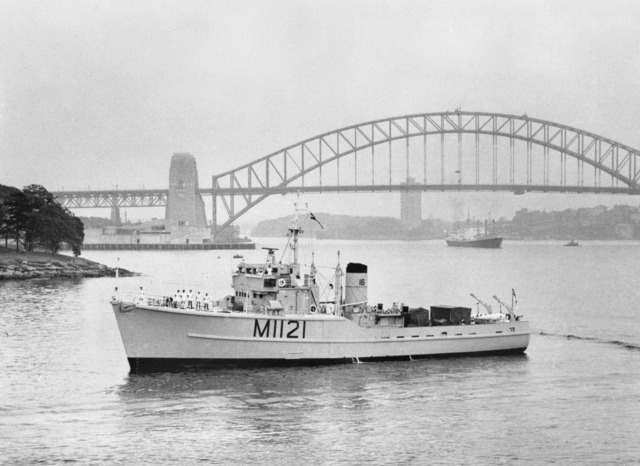
- HMAS Curlew in Sydney Harbour during the 1960s

History

United Kingdom
- Name: Chediston
- Builder: Montrose Shipyard, Scotland
- Launched: 6 October 1953
- Commissioned: 28 September 1954
- Fate: Sold to Australia

Australia
- Name: Curlew
- Acquired: 1961
- Commissioned: 12 August 1962
- Decommissioned: 30 April 1990
- Motto: "Safe Waters"
- Honours and awards: Battle honours: Malaysia 1964–66
- Fate: Undergoing conservation
- Badge

General characteristics
- Class & type: Ton-class minesweeper
- Displacement: 440 tons
- Length: 152 ft (46 m)
- Beam: 28 ft (8.5 m)
- Draught: 8 ft (2.4 m)
- Propulsion: Originally Mirrlees diesel, later Napier Deltic, producing 3,000 shp (2,200 kW) on each of two shafts
- Speed: 15 knots (28 km/h; 17 mph)
- Complement: 33
- Armament: 1 × Bofors 40 mm Automatic Gun L/60; 1 × Oerlikon 20 mm cannon; 1 × M2 Browning machine gun

HMAS Curlew (M 1121) was a Ton-class minesweeper operated by the Royal Navy (as HMS Chediston) from 1953 to 1961, and the Royal Australian Navy from 1962 to 1991. During her Australian service, the ship operated off Malaysia during the Indonesia–Malaysia confrontation during the mid-1960s, then was modified for use as a minehunter. Delays in bringing a replacement class into service kept Curlew operational until 1990, and she was sold into civilian service in 1991.

== Construction ==
The minesweeper was built by the Montrose Shipyard in Scotland, launched on 6 October 1953, and commissioned into the Royal Navy on 28 September 1954 as HMS Chediston.

== Operational history ==
=== Royal Navy ===
Between August 1955 and October 1957, the ship was attached to Tay Division of the Royal Naval Volunteer Reserve. After October 1957, the ship was placed in storage.

=== Royal Australian Navy ===
The ship was one of six sold to the Royal Australian Navy for A£5.5 million in 1961. Chediston was modified for tropical conditions, and commissioned on 12 August 1962 as HMAS Curlew.

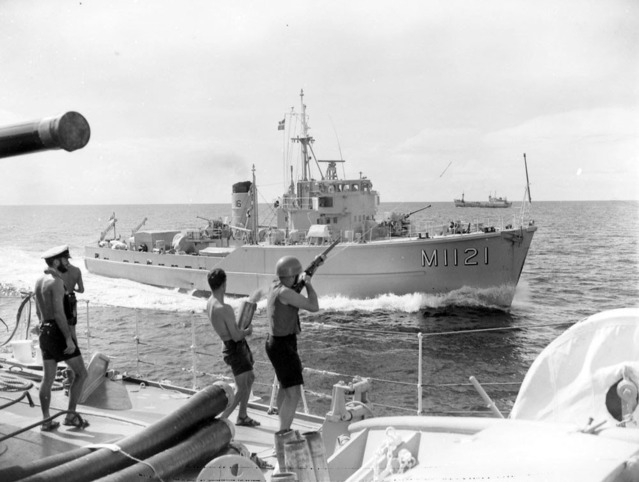
A sailor from the destroyer escort HMAS Derwent firing a line to Curlew while the ships were operating off Malaysia in February 1965

During the mid-1960s, Curlew was one of several ships operating in support of the Malaysian government during the Indonesia-Malaysia Confrontation. This service was later recognised with the battle honour "Malaysia 1964–66".

In the late 1960s, Curlew and sister ship Snipe were modified for use as minehunters.

Divers from Curlew inspected the wreck of Japanese submarine I-124.

== Decommissioning and fate ==
The delay in bringing the Bay class minehunters into service kept Curlew operational until 1990. Curlew paid off on 30 April 1990 and was sold on 17 June 1991. In the late 1990s she appeared in the movies Paradise Road and The Thin Red Line.

As of mid-2003, Curlew was operating out of Port Huon, Tasmania as a fishing vessel. The ship was later used for accommodation at Port Huon.

In April 2018 she was purchased for $1. Her new owner intends to use the ship as a floating backpacker hostel in Brisbane but this did not materialize. Since 2023, it has been silted up in the Margate marina in the municipality of Barretta, Tasmania, it is in March 2025 awaiting decontamination and asbestos removal,
