= HMAS Gull =

1954 Ton-class minesweeper

History

United Kingdom
- Name: Swanston
- Builder: J. S. Doig Limited
- Launched: 1 July 1954
- Commissioned: 27 July 1955
- Fate: Sold to Australia

Australia
- Name: Gull
- Acquired: 1961
- Commissioned: 19 July 1962
- Decommissioned: 7 November 1969
- Motto: "Safe Waters"
- Honours and awards: Battle honours: Malaysia 1964–66
- Fate: Decommissioned; ultimate fate unknown
- Badge

General characteristics
- Class & type: Ton-class minesweeper
- Displacement: 440 tons
- Length: 152 ft (46 m)
- Beam: 28 ft (8.5 m)
- Draught: 8 ft (2.4 m)
- Propulsion: Originally Mirrlees diesel, later Napier Deltic, producing 3,000 shp (2,200 kW) on each of two shafts
- Speed: 15 knots (28 km/h; 17 mph)
- Complement: 33
- Armament: 1 × Bofors 40 mm Automatic Gun L/60; 1 × Oerlikon 20 mm cannon; 1 × M2 Browning

HMAS Gull (M 1185) (formerly HMS Swanston) was a Ton-class minesweeper that served in the Royal Navy (RN) and Royal Australian Navy (RAN).

== Construction ==
The ship was built by J. S. Doig Limited at Grimsby, England for the RN. The ship was commissioned as HMS Swanston.

== Operational history ==
=== Australia ===
The minesweeper was sold to the RAN in 1961, and was recommissioned as HMAS Gull on 19 July 1962.

During the mid-1960s, Gull was one of several ships operating in support of the Malaysian government during the Indonesia-Malaysia Confrontation. This service was later recognised with the battle honour "Malaysia 1964–66".

== Decommissioning and fate ==
HMAS Gull paid off on 7 November 1969.
