= HMAS Hawk (M 1139) =

Decommissioned Minesweeper vessel

History

United Kingdom
- Name: Gamston
- Builder: Richards Ironworks
- Launched: 1 July 1954
- Renamed: HMS Somerleyton
- Fate: Sold to Australia

Australia
- Name: Hawk
- Acquired: 1961
- Commissioned: 18 July 1962
- Decommissioned: 7 January 1972
- Motto: "Safe Waters"
- Fate: Decommissioned
- Badge

General characteristics
- Class & type: Ton-class minesweeper
- Displacement: 440 tons
- Length: 152 ft (46 m)
- Beam: 28 ft (8.5 m)
- Draught: 8 ft (2.4 m)
- Propulsion: Originally Mirrlees diesel, later Napier Deltic, producing 3,000 shp (2,200 kW) on each of two shafts
- Speed: 15 knots (28 km/h; 17 mph)
- Complement: 33
- Armament: 1 × Bofors 40 mm Automatic Gun L/60; 1 × Oerlikon 20 mm cannon; 1 × M2 Browning machine gun

HMAS Hawk (M 1139) (formerly HMS Somerleyton) was a Ton-class minesweeper operated by the Royal Navy and the Royal Australian Navy (RAN). The minesweeper was built for the Royal Navy as HMS Gamston, but renamed HMS Somerleyton before entering service. She was sold to Australia in 1961, and commissioned as HMAS Hawk in 1962. The ship operated through the Indonesia-Malaysia Confrontation, and was decommissioned in 1972.

== Construction ==
The minesweeper was laid down for the Royal Navy by Richards Ironworks at Lowestoft, England. She was launched on 1 July 1954 as HMS Gamston, but was renamed HMS Somerleyton before entering service.

== Operational history ==
=== Australia ===
The ship was purchased by Australia in 1961 and commissioned into the RAN as HMAS Hawk on 18 July 1962.

Hawk was one of several Australian warships deployed to Malaysia to protect the nation during the Indonesia-Malaysia Confrontation. She became the second Australian minesweeper to see action during the Confrontation on 13 March 1966, when she came under fire from an Indonesian shore battery while patrolling off Raffles Light. Eleven high explosive rounds were fired at the ship, some landing within 200 yards (200 m) of the vessel, before Hawk withdrew from the area at speed. The following morning, Hawk intercepted a sampan and arrested the five Indonesians on board. The minesweeper's service during Confrontation was later recognised with the battle honour "Malaysia 1964–66".

== Decommissioning and fate ==
HMAS Hawk paid off on 7 January 1972.
