= Junkers Jumo 223 =

German 24 cylinder diesel engine

Jumo 223
- Type: Piston aero-engine
- Manufacturer: Junkers
- First run: 1940s

The Junkers Jumo 223 was an experimental 24-cylinder aircraft engine based on the Junkers Jumo 205. Like the Jumo 205, it was an opposed piston two-stroke diesel engine. It had four banks of six cylinders in a rhomboid configuration, with four crankshafts, one at each vertex of the rhombus, and 48 pistons. It was designed for a power of 2,500 horsepower at 4,400 rpm, and weighed around 2,370 kg.

Only one example is known to have been built. It is rumoured to have been taken to Moscow at the end of World War II, where development may have continued.

== Jumo 224 ==
In 1942 the 223 was abandoned in favour of an even larger engine, the Jumo 224 with an intended output power of 4,500 horsepower.

The Jumo 223 prototype was developed during the war at the same time as the successful three-crankshaft Napier Deltic engine.

== Bibliography ==
- Bingham, Victor (1998). Major Piston Aero Engines of World War II. Shrewsbury, UK: Airlife Publishing. ISBN 1-84037-012-2.
- Christopher, John (2013). The Race for Hitler's X-Planes: Britain's 1945 Mission to Capture Secret Luftwaffe Technology. Stroud, UK: History Press. ISBN 978-0-7524-6457-2.
- Gunston, Bill (2006). World Encyclopedia of Aero Engines: From the Pioneers to the Present Day (5th ed.). Stroud, UK: Sutton. ISBN 0-7509-4479-X.
- Kay, Antony (2004). Junkers Aircraft & Engines 1913–1945. London: Putnam Aeronautical Books. ISBN 0-85177-985-9.
