= Speculative =

Speculative may refer to:

== In arts and entertainment ==
- Speculative art (disambiguation)
- Speculative fiction, which includes elements created out of human imagination, such as the science fiction and fantasy genres
  - Speculative Fiction Group, a Persian literature group whose website which is named Fantasy Academy
  - Speculative poetry, a genre of poetry that focuses on fantastic, science fictional and mythological themes
- Speculative screenplay, or spec script, a non-commissioned, unsolicited screenplay
- The Speculative Society, a Scottish Enlightenment society dedicated to public speaking and literary composition, founded in 1764

== In computing ==
- Speculative execution, in computer systems is doing work, the result of which may not be needed. This performance optimization technique is used in pipelined processors and other systems
- Speculative multithreading, a dynamic parallelization technique that depends on out-of-order execution to achieve speedup on multiprocessor CPUs. It is a kind of speculative execution that occurs at the thread level as opposed to the instruction level

== In economics ==
- Speculation, the practice of engaging in risky transactions in an attempt to profit from fluctuations in market value
  - Speculative attack, denoting precipitous acquisition of assets by previously inactive speculators
  - Speculative demand, a demand for financial assets that is not dictated by real transactions such as trade or financing
  - Speculative development, in real estate
  - Speculative grade, a grade of bond below investment grade, having higher risk, but typically pay higher yield than better quality bonds
  - Economic bubble, when assets trade at a price that far exceeds an asset's intrinsic value due to speculation

== In linguistics ==
- Speculative mood, a grammatical mood found in some languages
- Speculative grammarians, members of a school of grammarian philosophy known as Modism, active in Europe in the 13th and 14th centuries
- Speculative Grammarian, a parody science journal

== In philosophy ==
- Speculative philosophy, an aspect of Continental philosophy
- Speculative realism, a movement in contemporary philosophy
- Speculative reason, theoretical as opposed to practical thought

== Other uses ==
- Speculative damages, in law, damages claimed by a plaintiff for losses that may occur in the future
- Speculative fire, a military tactic of firing to draw enemy fire and confirm the enemy's presence
- Speculative Period, defined in terms of archaeological methods employed in North America between 1492 and 1840

== See also ==
- Speculation (disambiguation)
