= HMS Belton =

Minesweeper of the Royal Navy

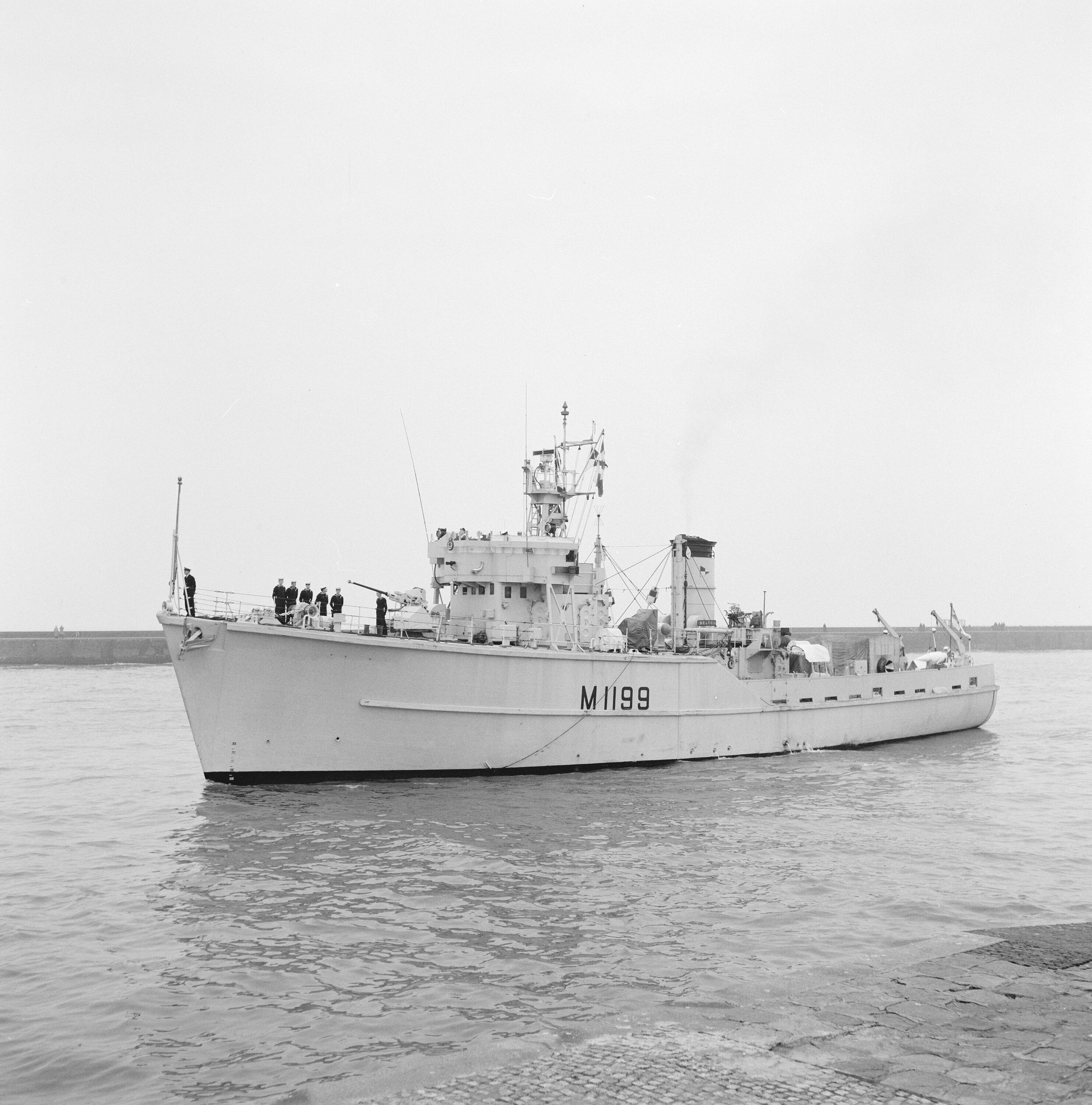
- Belton in 1959

History

United Kingdom
- Name: HMS Belton
- Builder: Doigs Shipyard, Grimsby
- Launched: 3 October 1955
- Identification: Pennant number: M1199
- Fate: Scrapped

General characteristics
- Class & type: Ton-class minesweeper
- Displacement: 440 long tons (450 t)
- Length: 153 ft (46.6 m)
- Beam: 28.9 ft (8.8 m)
- Draught: 8.2 ft (2.5 m)
- Propulsion: 2 × Paxman Deltic 18A-7A diesel engines at 3,000 bhp (2,200 kW)
- Speed: Cruise 13 knots (24 km/h) on one engine. Max 16 knots (30 km/h) on both
- Range: 2,500 nautical miles (4,600 km) at 12 knots (22 km/h)
- Complement: 32
- Armament: 1 x Bofors 40 mm gun

HMS Belton was a Ton-class minesweeper of the Royal Navy, launched on 3 October 1955 at Doigs Shipyard, Grimsby.

Belton joined the Fishery Protection Squadron in 1958, and remained part of the Squadron in 1962. Belton ran aground in Loch Maddy, North Uist in the Outer Hebrides on 23 October 1971. She was eventually refloated and taken to Greenock in Scotland but was found to be beyond economical repair. Although she never put to sea under her own power again, it was not until 25 November 1974 that she was sold for disposal.
