= Speculator (video game) =

1985 video game

- Publisher: OCO Software
- Release: 1985
- Genre: Simulation

Speculator is a 1985 video game published by OCO Software.

== Gameplay ==
Speculator is a game in which stock market trading is simulated in which 1 minute of playing time represents 6 minutes of time within the game.

== Reception ==
Johnny L. Wilson reviewed the game for Computer Gaming World, and stated that "Speculator compares favorably with any other investment simulation on the market to date. It is competitively priced for the basic game and should be an especially worthwhile investment with the addition of new data disks."
