= HMS Curlew (1803) =

Sloop of the Royal Navy

History

Great Britain
- Name: Leander
- Namesake: Protagonist in the story of Hero and Leander in Greek mythology
- Builder: Simon Temple, Temple shipbuilders, South Shields
- Launched: 1800
- Fate: Sold 1803

United Kingdom
- Name: HMS Curlew
- Acquired: 1803 by purchase
- Fate: Sold 1810

United Kingdom
- Name: Leander
- Acquired: 1810 by purchase
- Captured: 1 November 1810
- Fate: Lost after capture

General characteristics
- Tons burthen: 350, or 355 (bm)
- Length: 98 ft 7 in (30.0 m) (overall); 75 ft 7 1/2 in (23.1 m) (keel)
- Beam: 29 ft 6 in (9.0 m)
- Depth of hold: 12 ft 9 in (3.9 m)
- Propulsion: Sails
- Complement: 100
- Armament: Originally; Upper deck: 8 × 24-pounder Gover guns (Note: John Gover designed a new type of gun-carriage in the late 1790s or early 1800s that enabled smaller gun crews to handle the guns and the guns to be stored alongside the rails rather than perpendicular to them.) + 8 × 24-pounder carronades; Fc: 2 × 6-pounder guns; 1809: 10 × 18-pounder guns; Leander 1811:12 × 9-pounder guns

HMS Curlew was the mercantile sloop Leander, launched at South Shields in 1800. The Royal Navy purchased her in 1803 and named her Curlew as there was already a HMS Leander in service, and the Curlew name was available. Curlew was a sloop of 16 guns. The Navy sold her in 1810 and she returned to mercantile service as Leander. On her first voyage to the West Indies a French privateer captured her in a single-ship action; she was lost shortly thereafter.

== Merchantman Leander ==
Leander first appeared in Lloyd's Register (LR) in 1801. On 12 April 1801 a gale forced her aground at Torbay while she was on her way from London to Demerara.

Year	Master	Owner	Trade	Source & notes
1801	A.M'Gaie	Captain & Co.	London–Demerara	LR; damages repaired 1801
1803	G.White	A.Tullock	London–Demerara	LR; damages repaired 1801

== HMS Curlew ==
Between July and 27 September 1803, Curlew was at Deptford being fitted for naval service. Commander James Murrey Northey commissioned her in August for the North Sea.

On 2 April 1804 Curlew, sloop of war, reportedly sailed from the North Seas station with a squadron, and store ships, to Boulogne. Two days later, Curlew recaptured Stert, of Cardiff, William Pettigrew, master. Pettigrew reported, when he reached The Downs, that the privateer that had captured him off Dungeness had that same day taken nine vessels that she had sent to Dunkirk. (Note: The mention in Lloyd's List credited the recapture to Cerberus.)

Early in the year the Naval Chronicle noted that Curlew was "At present with the North Sea convoy." During the year Curlew escorted convoys and captured vessels, and performed errands.

In 1805 Curlew escorted a convoy to Newfoundland.

Between October 1806 and September 1807, Curlew was at Sheerness, undergoing fitting out. Commander Thomas Young replaced Northey in November 1806, commissioning Curlew for the North Sea.

On 13 October 1807, Abraham Lowe was promoted to Commander into Curlew, an appointment that the Admiralty confirmed. Lowe had served as First Lieutenant to Admiral Gambier in Prince of Wales at the second battle of Copenhagen. However, the appointment only lasted until December 1807.

Between June 1808 and April 1809, Curlew was at Woolwich, fitting out for the Baltic.< It is not clear where Curlew was or who her commander, if any, was between December 1807 and June 1808.

In late 1808 Commander John Tancock returned from the West Indies after an attack of yellow fever; he had been captain of Saint Christopher. In April 1809 Tancock assumed command of Curlew on the recommendation of Sir James Saumarez.

Under Tancock's command, Curlew protected British trade to and from Malmo and Gottenburg through the Sound. During this service, her boats captured seven Danish vessels carrying provisions to Norway. Five of these were:

Ingeberg Regina (21 October)
Castrup (same date)
Emanuel (22 October)
Hoffnung (same date)
Sloop, Name unknown (25 October)

Earlier, Curlew had captured, on 14 and 15 October, Hoffnung and Jussrow Margaretha. These two vessels may be Hoffnung and unknown named sloop in the list above.

On 10 November Curlew captured another Danish vessel of unknown name.

Disposal: After Curlew returned from the North Sea she was found to be defective and was paid off. The "Principal Officers and Commissioners of His Majesty's Navy" offered "Curlew Sloop, lying at Sheerness", for sale on 25 June 1810. She sold there on that day.

== Leander ==
Leander returned to mercantile service. Lloyd's Register for 1810 showed her with P. Main, master, Inglis & Co., owner, and trade London–Honduras.

On 1 November 1810 Leander encountered the French 4-gun privateer Spéculateur, of Saint-Malo. An engagement of about a half-hour followed during which men from Speculateur boarded Leander. Captain Main, two mates, and a seaman were killed, and six men were wounded. On Speculateur of her crew of 55 men, one was killed and two wounded. Leander was reportedly taken into Figuerra. A report a week later stated that Leander had been lost on her way into Tréguier, Côtes du Nord. A third report about a month later confirmed that it was Leander that had been captured and lost near Lorient.
