= HMAS Snipe =

Ton-class Minesweeper

History

United Kingdom
- Name: Alcaston
- Builder: John I. Thornycroft and Company
- Launched: 4 September 1952
- Fate: Sold to Australia

Australia
- Name: Snipe
- Acquired: 1961
- Commissioned: 11 September 1962
- Decommissioned: 3 June 1983
- Motto: "Safe Waters"
- Honours and awards: Battle honours: Malaysia 1964–66
- Fate: Decommissioned
- Badge

General characteristics
- Class & type: Ton-class minesweeper
- Displacement: 440 tons
- Length: 152 ft (46 m)
- Beam: 28 ft (8.5 m)
- Draught: 8 ft (2.4 m)
- Propulsion: Originally Mirrlees diesel, later Napier Deltic, producing 3,000 shp (2,200 kW) on each of two shafts
- Speed: 15 knots (28 km/h; 17 mph)
- Complement: 33
- Armament: 1 × Bofors 40 mm L/60 gun; 1 × Oerlikon 20 mm cannon; 1 × M2 Browning machine gun

HMAS Snipe (M1102) (formerly HMS Alcaston) was a Ton-class minesweeper which served in the Royal Navy (RN) and Royal Australian Navy (RAN).

== Construction ==
The ship was constructed by John I. Thornycroft and Company at Southampton and launched on 4 September 1952.

== Operational history ==
=== United Kingdom ===
The ship was completed on 16 December 1952, and commissioned in the Royal Navy as HMS Alcaston, being allocated the pennant number M.1102. Alcaston served with the 104th Mine Sweeping Squadron, and in November 1956 took part in Operation Musketeer, the Anglo-French attack on the Suez Canal. In 1961 she was sold to Australia along with five other Ton-class minesweepers.

=== Australia ===
Following her sale, the ship was refitted with her engines replaced by Napier Deltic diesel engines, stabilisers being fitted and air conditioning added to better suit the ship for Australian service. The ship recommissioned as HMAS Snipe on 11 September 1962.

In September 1963, Snipe took part in Operation Gardening, a large scale operation by Australian minesweepers to clear magnetic mines laid during the Second World War in the approaches to Tonolei harbour, Bouganville. On 10 February 1964, the aircraft carrier Melbourne and destroyer Voyager collided, sinking Voyager. Snipe took part in search for survivors from Voyager. During the mid-1960s, Snipe was one of several ships operating in support of the Malaysian government during the Indonesia-Malaysia Confrontation. This service was later recognised with the battle honour "Malaysia 1964–66". Her first tour took place between May 1964 and January 1965, with a second tour lasting from September 1965 to August 1966. On 16 December that year, Snipe was paid off into reserve.

Snipe remained in RAN service until her decommissioning on 3 June 1983.
