= Spéculateur =

History

France
- Name: Speculateur
- Owner: 1806 - 1809: Dubois; 1809 - 1811:Jean Baptiste Amiel and Cie; 1811 - 1813:Thomazeau and Amiel; 1813 - 1813/11/21: Thomazeau Jeune and Cie
- Builder: Saint-Malo
- Commissioned: 1806
- Captured: November 1813

General characteristics
- Tons burthen: 50 (French; "of load)
- Sail plan: Lugger
- Complement: 55-80
- Armament: 4-6 guns, and later 14-16 × 6-pounder carronades

Spéculateur was a lugger from Saint-Malo, commissioned in 1806. She made six cruises against British merchant shipping until the British Royal Navy captured her in 1813.

== Career ==
One source (in French), provides highly detailed information on the cost of equipping Spéculateur for her privateer cruises, and the return from the cruises.

For her first cruise Spéculateur was under the command of Captain Joseph Pardère-Niquet, who commanded her between 1806 and 1 February 1807, when he took her out of commission. Under his command she captured three prizes: Elisabeth, Ariel, and Falmouth.

Lloyd's List reported that the lugger privateer Speculation had taken Alert, Foresban, master, as Alert was sailing from Mogador to London. The privateer Active, of Guernsey, had recaptured Alert, which then sailed to Baltimore, Ireland.

On her second cruise Spéculateur was again under the command of Captain Joseph Pardère-Niquet. The cruise took place between 15 October 1807 and 1 March 1808. She captured Ariel and Flymouth.

Between 1808 and 1809, Spéculateur was under the command of Captain Jean Gaillebeau. On her third cruise she captured Todos los y animals.

For her fourth cruise Spéculateur was under the command of Captain Alexandre-William Black, with 64 men and 6 guns. This took place after her commissioning in October 1809 and ended in April 1810.

Captain Pierre-Claude Martin sailed Spéculateur on her fifth cruise from September 1810 to February 1811. She was armed with four guns and had a crew of 63 men. She captured several prizes: Deux amis, Grinder, Falmouth, Belle Cancella, and Leander.

On 1 November 1810 Spéculateur encountered Leander. An engagement of about a half-hour followed during which men from Spéculateur boarded Leander. On Leander, Captain Main, two mates, and a seaman were killed, and six men were wounded. Of Spéculateur's 55 crew men, one was killed and two wounded. Leander was reportedly taken into Figuerra. A report a week later stated that Leander had been lost on her way into Tréguier, Côtes du Nord. A third report about a month later confirmed that it was Leander that had been captured and lost near Lorient.

Spéculateur's sixth cruise lasted from November 1811 to April 1812. She was armed with six guns and had a crew of 69 men under the command of Captain Pierre Cormier. He captured three prizes: Falmouth, Sidbourg, and Sedbury.

== Fate ==
Capture cut Spéculateur's sixth cruise short. On 22 November 1813 HMS Reindeer captured the French 14-gun privateer lugger Spéculation in the Channel. She was 5 days out of St Malo but had taken nothing. Spéculateur had a crew of 72 to 80 men (including 42 Portuguese), under the command of Captain Guillaume-Marie Angenard. Before she struck Angenard was gravely wounded. He survived his injuries.
