= LÉ Grainne =

Irish Ton-class minesweeper

- Silhouette of LÉ Grainne (CM10)

History

United Kingdom
- Name: HMS Oulston
- Namesake: Oulston
- Builder: Thornycroft
- Launched: September 1953
- Out of service: 1970
- Renamed: 1970
- Identification: M1129

Ireland
- Name: LÉ Grainne
- Namesake: Gráinne, a legendary Irish princess
- Acquired: 1970
- Commissioned: 30 January 1971
- Decommissioned: 1987
- Identification: CM10
- Fate: Sold to Spanish interests for breaking, 1987

General characteristics
- Class & type: Ton-class minesweeper
- Displacement: 360 tonnes
- Length: 42.67 m (140.0 ft) overall
- Beam: 8.4 m (28 ft)
- Draught: 2.49 m (8 ft 2 in)
- Speed: 15 knots (28 km/h; 17 mph) maximum
- Complement: 30
- Armament: 40 mm Bofors; 2 × 20 mm Oerlikon AA

LÉ Gráinne (CM10) was a Ton-class minesweeper in the Irish Naval Service. She was the former HMS Oulston. She was named after Gráinne, a legendary princess who was promised to Fionn Mac Cumhail but ran away with his young follower Diarmuid.

Oulston was purchased from the Royal Navy in December 1970 and entered Irish service in January 1971. The purchase coincided with the removal from service of the Irish Naval Service's only fisheries protection vessel, LÉ Maev. The official naming ceremony for the LÉ Gráinne was held in February 1971.

Involved in fisheries protection, she was stricken in 1987 and sold to a Spanish company for breaking.
