= Ton-class minesweeper =

1953 class of minesweeper of the Royal Navy

- Silhouette of a Ton-class minesweeper

Class overview
- Name: Ton class
- Builders: John I. Thornycroft & Company, Southampton
- Operators: Royal Navy; Argentine Navy; Royal Australian Navy; Ghana Navy; Indian Navy; Irish Naval Service; Royal Malaysian Navy; Royal New Zealand Navy; South African Navy
- Preceded by: Algerine class
- Succeeded by: River class, Hunt class, Sandown class
- In service: 1951–1994 (Royal Navy)
- Completed: 119
- Active: 1 (Malaysia)
- Preserved: 4; HMS Wilton; HMAS Curlew; M/Y Teal; Mojo

General characteristics
- Type: Minesweeper
- Displacement: 440 long tons (447 t)
- Length: 152 ft (46 m)
- Beam: 28 ft (8.5 m)
- Draught: 8 ft (2.4 m)
- Propulsion: Originally Mirrlees diesel, later Napier Deltic, producing 3,000 shp (2,200 kW) on each of two shafts
- Speed: 15 knots (28 km/h)
- Complement: 33
- Armament: 1 × Bofors 40 mm gun; 1 × Oerlikon 20 mm cannon or 1 × M2 Browning machine gun

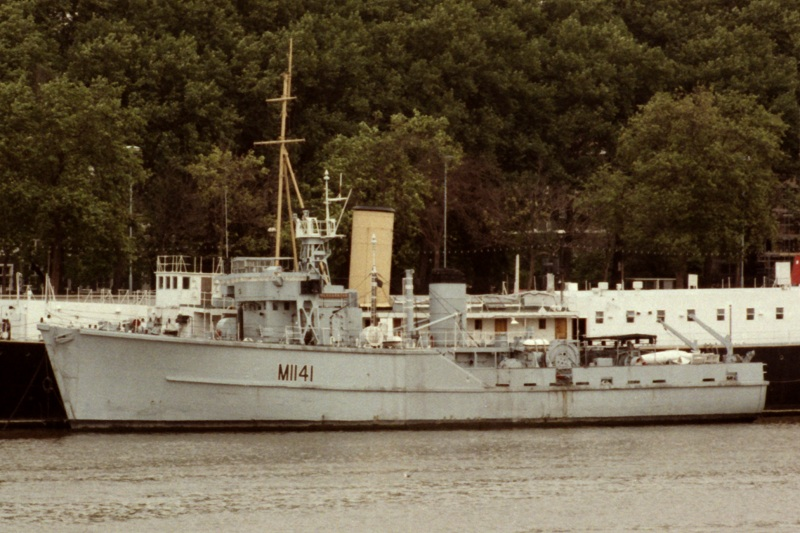
HMS Glasserton in 1987

The Ton class were coastal minesweepers built in the 1950s for the Royal Navy, but also used by other navies such as the South African Navy and the Royal Australian Navy. They were intended to meet the threat of seabed mines laid in shallow coastal waters, rivers, ports and harbours, a task for which the existing ocean-going minesweepers of the Algerine class were not suited.

== Description ==
The design of the class drew on lessons learnt in the Second World War when it became apparent that minelaying in coastal waters was more effective than in the deep sea; the existing fleet minesweepers were not well suited to deal with this threat. Design started at the Naval Construction Department in Bath in 1947 and the first ship was ordered in September 1950; the class eventually numbered 119 vessels. The lead constructor was John I. Thornycroft & Company, although Ton class vessels were also built at fifteen other yards. They were diesel powered vessels of 440 tons displacement fully laden, largely constructed from aluminium and other non-ferromagnetic materials, with a hull composed of a double layer of mahogany planking. Their small displacement and shallow draft gave them some protection against pressure and contact mines and allowed them to navigate in shallow inshore waters. Primary armament was one Bofors 40 mm gun, although the South African variants also had an Oerlikon 20 mm cannon behind the funnel. RN vessels also had the same but they were gradually removed and an M2 Browning machine gun mounted midships. Sweeping equipment was provided for moored mines and magnetic mines.

== History ==
It was originally planned to name the ships after insects, with names like Red Ant, Green Cockchafer and so on, but this plan was abandoned in 1952 and the Royal Navy ships of the class were given names of British towns and villages ending in "-ton", hence the name of the class. The contemporary but smaller inshore minesweepers were originally to be named after birds, but became the Ham class, after towns and villages ending in "-ham".

Sixteen of the class were converted to minehunters by the incorporation of active rudders and the installation of the Type 193 minehunting sonar and associated equipment, including a very welcome enclosed bridge, the exception being HMS Highburton which retained her open bridge until decommissioned in the 1970s, this actually becoming a source of pride for her crew when meeting other Ton crews. These vessels only retained mechanical "Oropesa" sweep capability.

The Ton class served as patrol vessels in Borneo, Malaysia, Northern Ireland and Hong Kong. The minehunters played a significant role in the Suez Canal clearance after the Yom Kippur War. They also provided the backbone of the UK's Fishery Protection Squadron (4th MCM).

With the rundown of the Royal Navy fleet in the 1960s, many were sent to become base ships for the Royal Naval Reserve allowing reserve crews to get to sea for short periods without a lot of effort to organise a crew of significant size. Some of these had their names changed to reflect the RNR Division they were attached to. Five of the class in Royal Navy service were permanently converted to patrol craft for service policing of Hong Kong's territorial waters in 1971. These vessels, comprising HM Ships Beachampton, Monkton, Wasperton, Wolverton and Yarnton had their minesweeping gear removed and were fitted with a second Bofors 40 mm gun aft of the funnel. They also received new pennant numbers: Beachampton P1007, Monkton P1055, Wasperton P1089, Wolverton P1093 and Yarnton P1096. Two vessels were converted into survey ships, one an air sea rescue vessel and one a diving tender.

At the start of the Falklands War in 1982, the elderly Ton-class vessels were deemed to be unsuited to the long voyage to the South Atlantic, so five deep-sea trawlers were hired and hastily converted into minesweepers, although the crews were largely taken from the Ton-class mine countermeasures flotilla based at Rosyth.

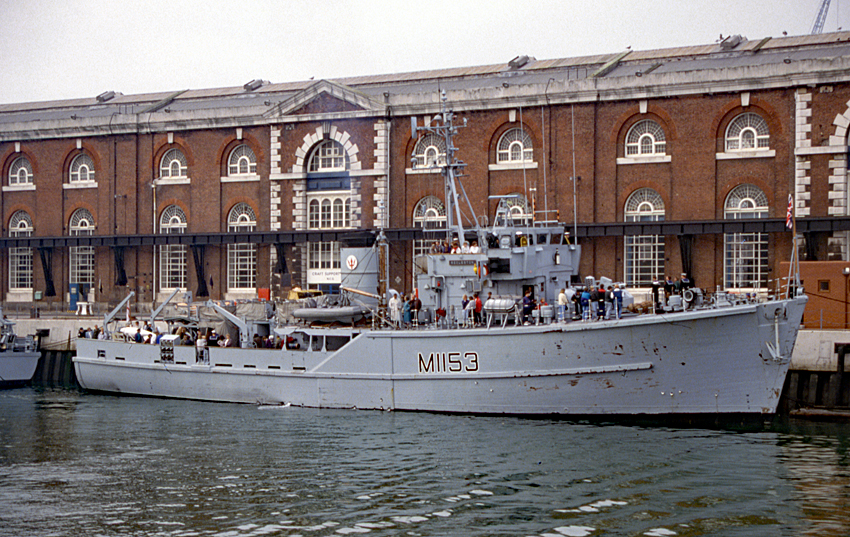
HMS Kedleston decommissioning at Portsmouth in 1991

The RNR vessels lasted until the introduction of the River-class minesweepers in 1984. The remainder of the regular RN ships began to be retired with the introduction of the Hunt-class MCM vessels from 1980. The last RN Ton-class ship to be withdrawn was also the last to have been built; HMS Wilton had been built in 1971 - 1972 with a hull made of glass reinforced plastic (GRP) instead of wood. She was the first major warship in the world using this technology, which was used for all of the succeeding Hunt-class ships. Decommissioned in 1994, Wilton became a floating clubhouse for the Essex Yacht Club at Leigh-on-Sea.

== Ships ==
=== Royal Navy ===
The Royal Navy of the United Kingdom received 115 Ton-class minesweepers during the 1950s. Several were later sold or transferred to other countries.

Ship name	Pennant	Launched	Fate
Alcaston	M1102	5 January 1953	sold to Australia in 1961, renamed HMAS Snipe, broken up in 1985
Aldington	M1171	15 September 1955	sold to Ghana in 1964, renamed Ejura, broken up in 1979
Alfriston	M1103	29 April 1953	broken up in 1988
Alverton	M1104	18 November 1953	sold to Ireland in 1971, renamed LÉ Banba, broken up in Spain in 1984
Amerton	M1105	16 March 1953	broken up in 1971
Appleton	M1106	4 September 1953	broken up in 1972
Ashton (ex-Cheriton)	M1198	5 September 1956	broken up in 1977
Badminton	M1149	14 October 1954	broken up in 1970
Beachampton	M1107	29 June 1953	converted to Hong Kong Patrol craft 1971 and pennant number changed to P1007, broken up in 1985
Belton	M1199	3 October 1955	broken up in 1974
Bevington	M1108	17 March 1953	sold to Argentina in 1968, renamed Tierra del Fuego, broken up in 1995
Bickington	M1109	14 May 1952	broken up in 1988
Bildeston	M1110	9 June 1952	broken up in 1988
Blaxton	M1132	26 January 1955	sold to Ireland in 1970, renamed LÉ Fola, broken up in Spain in 1987
Bossington (ex-Embleton)	M1133	2 December 1955	broken up in 1988
Boulston	M1112	6 October 1952	broken up in 1975
Brereton	M1113	14 March 1955	broken up in 1992
Brinton	M1114	8 August 1952	sold in 1997, broken up in 1998
Bronington	M1115	19 March 1953	became a museum ship in 1989, sank at moorings in Birkenhead Docks in 2016. Fundraising is taking place to have the ship raised and restored.
Burnaston	M1116	18 December 1952	broken up in 1971
Buttington	M1117	11 June 1953	broken up in 1970
Calton	M1118	24 October 1953	broken up in 1968
Carhampton	M1119	21 July 1955	broken up in 1970
Castleton	M1207	26 August 1958	sold to South Africa in 1959, renamed SAS Johannesburg, broken up in 1989
Caunton	M1120	18 December 1952	broken up in 1970
Chawton	M1209	24 September 1957	broken up in 1977
Chediston	M1121	20 February 1953	sold to Australia in 1961 and renamed HMAS Curlew; used as a fishing vessel.
Chilcompton	M1122	6 October 1953	sold and broken up in 1971
Chilton	M1215	15 July 1957	sold to South Africa in 1958 and renamed SAS East London
Clarbeston	M1123	18 February 1954	broken up in 1987
Coniston	M1101	9 July 1952	broken up in 1970
Crichton	M1124	17 March 1953	broken up in 1987
Crofton	M1216	7 March 1958	broken up in 1987
Cuxton	M1125	9 November 1953	broken up in 1992
Dalswinton	M1126	24 September 1953	broken up in 1973
Darlaston	M1127	29 September 1953	sold to Malaysia 1960 and renamed KD Mahamiru
Dartington	M1203	26 June 1958	broken up in 1970
Derriton	M1128	22 December 1953	broken up in 1970. The machinery and fittings were reconditioned and installed in the prototype Glass Reinforced Plastic (GRP) minehunter HMS Wilton, launched on 18 January 1972 and commissioned on 14 July 1970; Preserved 2001
Dilston	M1168	15 November 1954	sold to Malaysia in 1964 and renamed KD Jerai
Dufton	M1145	13 November 1954	broken up in 1977
Dumbleton	M1212	8 November 1957	sold to South Africa in 1958, renamed SAS Port Elizabeth, broken up in 1989
Dunkerton	M1144	8 March 1954	sold to South Africa in 1955 and renamed SAS Pretoria; broken up in 2010
Durweston	M1201	18 August 1955	sold to India in 1956 and renamed Kakinada
Edderton	M1111	1 November 1953	converted to a survey vessel in 1964 and renamed Myrmidon, sold to Malaysia in 1969 and renamed Perantau
Essington	M1134	26 September 1956	sold to Malaysia 1964 and renamed Kinabalu
Fenton	M1135	2 December 1955	broken up in 1968
Fiskerton	M1206	12 April 1957	broken up in 1977
Fittleton	M1136	26 September 1956	broken up in 1977
Flockton	M1137	3 June 1954	broken up in 1969
Floriston	M1138	26 January 1955	sold in 1968
Gavinton	M1140	27 July 1953	broken up in 1991
Glasserton	M1141	3 December 1953	broken up in 1988
Hazleton	M1142	6 February 1954	sold to South Africa in 1955 and renamed Kaapstaad; broken up in 1989
Hexton	M1143	June 1954	sold to Malaysia in 1963 and renamed Ledang
Hickleton	M1131	26 January 1955	transferred to New Zealand in 1965
Highburton	M1130	2 June 1954	broken up in 1978
Hodgeston	M1146	6 April 1954	broken up in 1988
Houghton	M1211	22 November 1957	broken up in 1971
Hubberston	M1147	14 September 1954	broken up in 1992
Ilmington	M1148	8 March 1954	sold to Argentina 1967 and renamed Formosa; broken up in 2004
Invermoriston	M1150	2 June 1954	converted to air-sea rescue vessel; broken up in 1971
Iveston	M1151	14 October 1954	became a sea cadet training ship in 1993; broken up in 2015
Jackton	M1152	28 February 1955	sold to Australia 1961 and renamed HMAS Teal
Kedleston	M1153	21 December 1953	broken up in 1992
Kellington	M1154	12 October 1954	sea cadet training ship in 1993, broken up in 2009
Kemerton	M1156	27 November 1953	broken up in 1975
Kildarton (ex-Liston)	M1162	23 May 1955	sold in 1969
Kirkliston	M1157	18 February 1954	broken up in 1991
Laleston	M1158	18 May 1954	broken up in 1985
Lanton	M1159	30 July 1954	broken up in 1970
Letterston	M1160	26 October 1954	broken up in 1971
Leverton	M1161	2 March 1955	broken up in 1972
Lewiston	M1208	3 November 1959	broken up in 1986
Lullington	M1163	31 August 1955	sold to Malaysia in 1966 and renamed Tahan
Maddiston	M1164	27 January 1956	broken up in 1975
Maryton	M1202	3 April 1958	broken up in 1969
Maxton	M1165	24 May 1956	broken up in 1989
Monkton (ex-Kelton)	M1155	30 November 1955	converted to Hong Kong Patrol craft 1971 and pennant number changed to P1055; sold in 1985
Nurton	M1166	22 October 1956	broken up in 1995
Oakington	M1213	10 December 1958	sold to South Africa in 1959 and renamed Mosselbaai; broken up in 1989
Oulston	M1129	29 September 1953	sold to Ireland in 1971 and renamed LÉ Grainne, broken up in Spain 1987
Overton	M1197	28 January 1956	sold to India in 1956 and renamed Karwar
Packington	M1214	3 July 1958	sold to South Africa in 1959 and renamed Walvisbaai
Penston	M1169	9 May 1955	broken up in 1970
Picton	M1170	20 October 1955	broken up in 1969
Pollington	M1173	10 October 1957	broken up in 1987
Puncheston	M1174	20 November 1956	broken up in 1977
Quainton	M1175	10 October 1957	broken up in 1979
Rennington	M1176	27 November 1958	sold to Argentina in 1967 and renamed Chaco, broken up in 2004
Repton (ex-Ossington)	M1167	1 May 1956	sold and broken up in 1982
Roddington	M1177	24 February 1955	broken up in 1972
Santon	M1178	18 August 1955	transferred to New Zealand 10 April 1965
Sefton	M1179	27 November 1958	broken up in 1978
Shavington	M1180	25 April 1955	broken up in 1987
Sheraton	M1181	20 July 1955	sold in 1997
Shoulton	M1182	10 September 1954	broken up in 1981
Singleton	M1183	18 November 1955	sold to Australia in 1961 and renamed HMAS Ibis
Soberton	M1200	20 November 1956	sold in 1993
Somerleyton (ex-Gamston)	M1139	1 July 1954	sold to Australia in 1961 and renamed HMAS Hawk
Stratton	M1210	29 July 1957	sold to South Africa in 1959 and renamed Kimberley
Stubbington	M1204	8 August 1956	broken up in 1989
Sullington	M1184	20 July 1955	converted to a survey vessel in 1965 and renamed Mermaid; broken up in 1970
Swanston	M1185	10 September 1954	sold to Australia in 1961 and renamed HMAS Gull
Tarlton	M1186	18 November 1955	sold to Argentina in 1967 and renamed Río Negro
Thankerton	M1172	4 September 1955	sold to Malaysia in 1966 and renamed Brinchang
Upton	M1187	15 March 1956	broken up in 1991
Walkerton	M1188	21 November 1956	used as Dartmouth Training Ship (Britannia Royal Naval College) in the 1970s; reversed onto the Plymouth breakwater in 1977; broken up in 1990.
Wasperton	M1189	28 February 1956	converted to Hong Kong Patrol craft 1971 and pennant number changed to P1089; sold in 1986
Wennington	M1190	6 April 1955	sold to India in 1956 and renamed Cuddalore
Whitton	M1191	30 January 1956	sold to India in 1956 and renamed Cannanore
Wiston	M1205	3 June 1958	broken up in 1982
Wlkieston	M1192	26 June 1956	broken up in 1976
Wolverton	M1193	22 October 1956	converted to Hong Kong Patrol craft 1971 and pennant number changed to P1093. Sold 1980s and renamed as Wolverton Club. Destroyed in fire 1991.
Woolaston	M1194	6 March 1958	broken up in 1980
Wotton	M1195	24 April 1956	broken up in 1992
Yarnton	M1196	26 March 1956	converted to Hong Kong Patrol craft 1971 and pennant number changed to P1096

=== Argentine Navy ===

Ship name	Pennant	Acquired	Fate
Chaco		ex-HMS Rennington purchased in 1967	broken up in 2004
Chubut	M3	ex-HMNZS Santon acquired in 1967	broken up in 2004
Formosa		ex-HMS Ilmington	broken up in 2004
Neuquén	M1	ex-HMNZS Hickleton acquired in 1967	purchased in 1971 and broken up in 1996
Río Negro		ex-HMS Tarlton purchased in 1967	
Tierra del Fuego		ex-HMS Bevington purchased in 1968	broken up in 1995

=== Royal Australian Navy ===

The Royal Australian Navy bought six ex-Royal Navy minesweepers of the Ton class in 1961, and all were in service by 1962. Individual ships were decommissioned over the years until the final ship in service, Curlew, was decommissioned and repurposed as a civilian fishing vessel. Curlew had been updated as a mine hunter in 1967-1968 while the same treatment was given to Snipe in 1969–1970.

Ship name	Pennant	Acquired	Fate
Curlew	M 1121	ex-HMS Chediston purchased in 1961	decommissioned in 1990, converted to civilian fishing vessel.
Gull	M 1185	ex-HMS Swanston commissioned 19 July 1962	decommissioned 7 November 1969
Hawk	M 1139	ex-HMS Somerleyton commissioned 18 July 1962	decommissioned 7 January 1972, broken up
Ibis	M 1183	ex-HMS Singleton commissioned 7 September 1962	decommissioned 4 May 1984
Snipe	M 1102	ex-HMS Alcaston purchased in 1961	broken up in 1985
Teal	M 1152	ex-HMS Jackton commissioned 30 August 1962	decommissioned 14 August 1970, serving as a training ship

=== Ghana ===

Ship name	Pennant	Acquired	Fate
Ejura		ex-HMS Aldington purchased in 1964	broken up in 1979

=== India ===

Ship name	Pennant	Acquired	Fate
Cannanore		ex-HMS Whitton purchased in 1956	
Cuddalore		ex-HMS Wennington purchased in 1956	
Kakinada		ex-HMS Durweston purchased in 1956	
Karwar		ex-HMS Overton purchased in 1956	

=== Ireland ===

Ship name	Pennant	Acquired	Fate
Banba	M1104	ex-HMS Alverton purchased in 1971	broken up in Spain in 1984
Fola		ex-HMS Blaxton purchased in 1970	broken up in Spain in 1987
Gráinne	CM10	ex-HMS Oulston commissioned 30 January 1971	broken up in Spain in 1987

=== Royal Malaysian Navy ===

Ship name	Pennant	Acquired	Fate
Brinchang	M1172	ex-HMS Thankerton purchased in 1966	decommissioned in 1980s
Jerai	M1168	ex-HMS Dilston purchased in 1964	decommissioned in 1977
Kinabalu	M1134	ex-HMS Essington purchased in 1964	decommissioned in 1981
Ledang	M1143	ex-HMS Hexton purchased in 1963	decommissioned in 1980s
Mahamiru	M1127	ex-HMS Darlaston purchased in 1960	decommissioned in 1980s
Perantau	M1111	ex-HMS Edderton purchased in 1969	converted to a Coastal Survey Vessel in 1964
Tahan	M1163	ex-HMS Lullington purchased in 1966	decommissioned in 1980s

=== Royal New Zealand Navy ===

Ship name	Pennant	Acquired	Fate
Hickleton	M1131	ex-HMS Hickleton commissioned 10 April 1965	decommissioned in December 1966 and transferred to Argentina as Neuquén in 1967 (sold in 1971)
Santon	M1178	ex-HMS Santon commissioned 10 April 1965	decommissioned in December 1966 and sold to Argentina as Chubut in 1967

=== South African Navy ===

Ship name	Pennant	Acquired	Fate
Durban	M1499	Built on order for South African Navy	Undergoing restoration at Port Natal Maritime Museum for exhibition as a museum ship. Sank at its dock in shallow water on 29 June 2020.
East London	M1215	ex-HMS Chilton purchased in 1958	sold to an Italian film company
Johannesburg	M1207	ex-HMS Castleton purchased in 1959	broken up in 1989
Kaapstad	P1557	ex-HMS Hazleton purchased in 1955	broken up in 1989
Kimberley	M1210	ex-HMS Stratton purchased in 1959	
Mosselbaai	M1213	ex-HMS Oakington purchased in 1959	broken up in 1989
Port Elizabeth	M1212	ex-HMS Dumbleton purchased in 1958	broken up in 1989
Pretoria	P1556	ex-HMS Dunkerton purchased in 1955	broken up in 2010
Walvisbaai	P1214	ex-HMS Packington purchased in 1959	sold to the Walt Disney Company to portray the R/V Belafonte in The Life Aquatic with Steve Zissou; Converted to private yacht in Dubai 2012
Windhoek	M1498	Built on order for South African Navy	

== See also ==
- List of decommissioned ships of the South African Navy
- Ton-class minesweepers of the Royal Australian Navy

Equivalent minesweepers of the same era

- Dokkum class
- Kasado class
- Vanya class
- Democrația class
- Agile class
