= University of Kyrenia =

Private university in Kyrenia, Northern Cyprus

- Girne Üniversitesi
- Type: Private
- Established: 2013
- Rector: İlkay Salihoğlu
- Location: Kyrenia, Northern Cyprus
- Colors: Turquoise and white
- Website: https://www.kyrenia.edu.tr

University of Kyrenia was established in Kyrenia in 2013 with the approval of the Council of Ministers, in accordance with the National Education Law No. 17/1986 of the Ministry of National Education of the Turkish Republic of Northern Cyprus. It is a sister institution of Near East University.

== History ==
University of Kyrenia (GÜ) completed the necessary legal infrastructure procedures in 2013 and was established with the permission of the Ministry of National Education of the Turkish Republic of Northern Cyprus (TRNC) and subsequently with the approval of the TRNC Higher Education Planning, Supervision, Accreditation and Supervision Board (YÖDAK) on 19 March 2013, with decision number 33/2006-12, in Girne, one of the most beautiful and historic cities in Cyprus.

University Of Kyrenia was founded with the mission of "educating graduates who are able to think objectively, question, research, produce knowledge and value, are creative, value ethical and moral values, and have a sense of social responsibility, with an international-standard educational infrastructure." The foundations of University of Kyrenia's education and teaching are based on are based on the infrastructure of its sister university, Near East University, which shaped and implemented the establishment of the first Faculty of Maritime Studies in Cyprus in 1978, and its 37 years of experience.

It has taken over the Maritime, Maritime Business and Management, and Marine Sciences faculties, which stand out for their long-standing maritime education tradition, as well as the Maritime Transport Management Engineering Postgraduate Programme and the Maritime Vocational School programmes, along with all their infrastructure and superstructure, from its sister university. Thus, from the moment it was established, University of Kyrenia immediately gained the necessary infrastructure for its students, teaching staff, and education, and was structured as an ideal higher education institution even before it began operations, thanks to the experience it inherited from the past.

== Academic ==
Following YÖDAK's approval, University of Kyrenia submitted its official application to the Higher Education Council (YÖK) of the Republic of Turkey in accordance with the relevant regulations and legislation. At its meeting on 16 January 2014, the YÖK General Assembly approved the decision to establish University of Kyrenia. With the decision that formed the history of our university, dated 28 January 2014 and numbered 75850160.301.01.182, the university was officially established and began education and training in its first year with a total of 10 programmes in the field of maritime studies.

At its inception, our university began its educational and teaching activities with the facilities provided by its sister institution, Near East University. Within less than a year, it began to establish its own campus on a 27-acre site located on the coastline of the Girne Karakum area. The foundation stone was laid in a ceremony attended by a large number of people on 27 September 2013, and the university moved into its campus, which opened on 15 November 2015, the Republic Day of the Turkish Republic of Northern Cyprus.

The Maritime programmes, which form the foundation of our establishment and were the starting point for growth after the opening, largely meet the conditions and standards set by the International Maritime Organisation (IMO), and the necessary inspections and approvals are obtained in accordance with the conditions and standards set out in the relevant regulations of the Turkish Republic Ministry of Transport, Maritime Affairs and Communications. The regular inspections by the relevant directorates of the aforementioned Ministry are ongoing.

The University's Founding Board of Trustees, having thoroughly analysed the needs in the field of aviation, decided to establish the Faculty of Aviation and Space Sciences and its affiliated departments of Civil Aviation Logistics, Aviation Management (Civil Aviation Transport Management) and Pilot Training, and swiftly completed the necessary processes. The Faculty of Aviation and Space Sciences commenced education in the 2015-2016 academic year.

University of Kyrenia Flight Training Organisation (UEO) provides flight theoretical knowledge training, which are the basic courses for the pilot training department.

The UEO within University of Kyrenia has been approved by the General Directorate of Civil Aviation (SHGM), the competent authority in the field of Civil Aviation in Turkey, with certificate number TR-FTO (A)-32.

The UEO has a unique "Quality Management System" that encompasses the "Quality Assurance System" defined in the SHGM-approved "UEO Quality Management Manual". Audits are conducted within the scope of quality assurance by the SHGM and the Internal Quality Management Team in accordance with the regulations and rules of the International Civil Aviation Organisation (ICAO) and the European Aviation Safety Agency (EASA).

University of Kyrenia continues its rise in the "World's Best Scientists" ranking published by AD Scientific Index, an international higher education rating organisation. University of Kyrenia, with 78 academics on the list, ranked 4 academics in the top 10 per cent, 9 academics in the top 30 per cent, and 29 academics in the top 50 per cent among the world's best academics.

Our university's strategic approach, which prioritises research, continues by providing 'Scientific Research Project Support for Teaching Staff'. Financial support is provided for teaching staff to participate in conferences and scientific meetings and for publications in reputable scientific journals, with the aim of encouraging them to develop themselves. Four research projects currently underway are being funded by university resources.

University of Kyrenia has become one of the most prominent universities in the region in the short time since its establishment. Our university, which grows every year, established the Faculties of Education, Law, Economics, Architecture, Engineering, Health Sciences and Medicine in 2015. As of the 2019-2020 academic year, we have a total of 1 Postgraduate Education Institute, 14 Faculties, 2 Higher Schools, and 6 Vocational Higher Schools affiliated with YOK / YÖDAK-approved undergraduate, associate degree, master's, and doctoral programmes in English and Turkish. With the planned new programmes, it contributes to the development of our country and region through education, teaching, and research.

== Campus ==
Established to serve education and research activities through effective and timely management decisions, Dr. Suat Günsel Faculty of Medicine Hospital, one of the best-equipped health centres in the region, opened on 15 November 2016.

Following the establishment of the Faculty of Medicine and the Faculty of Dentistry, modern educational buildings belonging to these faculties were constructed. Subsequently, the English Preparatory School, the Faculty of Law, and the Faculty of Economics and Administrative Sciences buildings were completed and opened for service.

Our university continued its investments in line with its sustainable growth strategy; in 2017, it successfully completed the amphitheatres, library complex and student dormitory projects. As part of the development process, the Great Library was completed in 2021 and the Faculty of Health Sciences building was completed in 2022, contributing to education and research activities. In parallel with these, Microbiology, Anatomy, Physiology, Histology and Multidisciplinary Laboratories within the Faculty of Medicine, 2 Nursing Practice Laboratories and 1 Physiotherapy Laboratory within the Faculty of Health Sciences, and 1 Gastronomy Laboratory within the Faculty of Tourism have been completed.

Aware that sustainability and prestige in the world of education and science depend on research and knowledge production, University of Kyrenia attaches great importance to research programmes and scientific publications. In this context, within such a short period of time, it has participated in and carried out one EU-funded and one TÜBİTAK-funded marine research project. In order to conduct marine research, it has equipped the R/V J.TEAL research vessel, the only one of its kind in Cyprus, with modern equipment and made it available to researchers.

== Academic units ==
=== Faculties ===
Faculty of Maritime Studies, Blue Economy and Marine Sciences

- Fisheries Technology Engineering
- Marine Engineering
- Maritime Management
- Maritime Transportation Management Engineering

Faculty of Dentistry

- Oral and Maxillofacial Surgery
- Oral and Maxillofacial Radiology
- Pediatric Dentistry
- Endodontics
- Orthodontics
- Periodontology
- Prosthodontics
- Restorative Dentistry

Faculty of Pharmacy

Faculty of Education

- English Language Teaching
- Psychological Counseling and Guidance
- Turkish Language Teaching
- Special Education Teaching

Faculty of Arts and Sciences

- Psychology

Faculty of Aviation And Space Sciences

- Aviation Management
- Pilotage – Professional Pilot Training
- Aeronautical Engineering

Faculty of Law

- Department of Law

Faculty of Economics And Administrative Sciences

- Banking and Finance
- Business Administration
- Logistics Management
- International Relations
- Tourism and Hospitality Management

Faculty of Health Sciences

- Nutrition and Dietetics
- Physiotherapy and Rehabilitation
- Nursery

Faculty of Architecture

- Interior Design
- Architecture

Faculty of Engineering

- Computer Engineering
- Electrical and Electronic Engineering
- Civil Engineering
- Mechanical Engineering
- Software Engineering

Faculty of Medicine

- Basic Sciences Division
- Medical Sciences Division
- Surgical Sciences Division

=== Vocational Schools ===
Vocational School of Justice

- Justice

Maritime Vocational School

- Maritime Transportation and Management
- Maritime Management and Operations
- Ship Machinery
- Underwater Technologies

Vocational School of Health Services

- Anesthesia
- Electroneurophysiology
- Dental Prosthetics Technology
- Physiotherapy
- First and Emergency Aid
- Operating Room Services
- Oral and Dental Health
- Medical Imaging Techniques
- Elderly Care

Aviation Vocational School

- Civil Air Transportation Management
- Civil Aviation Cabin Services
- Unmanned Aerial Vehicle Technology and Operator

Vocational School of Technical Sciences

- Computer Programming
- Environmental Protection And Control

Vocational School of Foreign Languages

=== Institute ===
Institute of Graduate Studies

Master's Degree Programs

- Aeronautical Engineering
- Aviation Sciences
- Baking and Finance
- Big Data Analytics
- Business Administration
- Clinical Embryology
- Immunology-Allergy
- International Relations
- Marime Transportation Management Engineering
- Tourism Management

Doctoral Programs

- Immunology-Allergy
- Marime Transportation Management Engineering
