= MAN Diesel =

Manufacturer of large-bore diesel engines

MAN Diesel SE
- Industry: Manufacturing, automotive industry, marine engineering
- Predecessor: Burmeister & Wain
- Defunct: 2010
- Fate: Merged
- Successor: MAN Energy Solutions
- Headquarters: Augsburg, Bavaria, Germany, 1758 “St. Anthony” iron works in Sterkrade, Germany
- Products: Diesel and other engines, turbomachinery
- Revenue: €3.4 billion (2013)
- Number of employees: 14,413 (2013)
- Parent: MAN SE

MAN Diesel SE was a German manufacturer of large-bore diesel engines for marine propulsion systems and power plant applications. In 2010 it was merged with MAN Turbo to form MAN Diesel & Turbo.

== History ==
In 1980 MAN acquired the Burmeister & Wain Danish shipyard and diesel engine producer. Though engine production at Christianshavn was discontinued in 1987, successful engine programs were rolled out. At Teglholmen in 1988 a spare parts and key components production factory was established, as was an R&D centre at the same site in 1992. Though all Copenhagen operations were consolidated at Teglholmen in 1994 and the last volume production unit at the B&W Shipyard was delivered in 1996, in 2000 MAN B&W Diesel two-stroke diesel engines had over 70% market share, with a substantial number of MC-line engines on order.

The electronically controlled line of ME diesel two-stroke engines was added in 2002 with a maximum cylinder bore of 108 cm. MAN B&W Diesel, Denmark, employed approximately 2,200 at the end of 2003 and had 100 GW, or more than 8000 MC engines, in service or on order by 2004.

In 2006 the MAN Diesel AG established a common European corporation named MAN Diesel SE (Societas Europaea).

On 22 February 2006 in Copenhagen the first diesel engine with more than 75,000 kW (101,000 hp) went into service. MAN B&W Diesel licensee Hyundai Heavy Industries in Korea built the 12K98MC with 75,790 kW (101,640 hp). The engine was installed in the first of a series of container ships with a capacity over 9,000 TEU built for Greek owner Costamare. The vessels were to be chartered to COSCON (COSCO Container Lines) in China.

In 2010 MAN Diesel and MAN Turbo were merged to form MAN Diesel & Turbo.

=== British acquisitions ===
In 2000, MAN Diesel (then known as MAN B&W Diesel) acquired Alstom Engines from GEC. This included the former diesel businesses of English Electric, Mirrlees Blackstone, Napier & Son, Paxman and Ruston.

Mirrlees Blackstone Limited was formed on June 1, 1969 by the merger of Mirrlees National Limited (formerly Mirrlees, Bickerton and Day) and Blackstone & Company Limited. All were, at the time, members of the Hawker Siddeley Group.

== Locations ==
MAN Diesel has production facilities in Augsburg, Copenhagen, Frederikshavn, Saint-Nazaire, Chhatrapati Shambhaji Nagar and Shanghai.

== See also ==
- MAN SE
- Wärtsilä

== Sources ==
- Johannes Lehmann, A Century of Burmeister & Wain, Copenhagen, 1948.
