= Napier Deltic =

Diesel engine model

Deltic

Overview
- Manufacturer: D. Napier & Son

Layout
- Configuration: 18 cylinder deltic
- Displacement: 5384 cubic inches (88.3 litres)
- Cylinder bore: 5.125 inches
- Piston stroke: 7.25 inches
- Compression ratio: 19.26 : 1

Combustion
- Operating principle: 2-stroke
- Fuel type: Diesel

Output
- Power output: 2000 BHP at 2000 rpm

Animated diagram of Deltic engine

Cylinder firing order of the 18 cylinder Napier Deltic diesel engine: The grid represents triangular cylinder arrangement (banks A, B, C) and rows 1 to 6

The Napier Deltic engine is a British diesel engine used in marine and locomotive applications, designed and produced by D. Napier & Son. It is designed as a valveless opposed-piston, supercharged, two-stroke engine with uniflow scavenging. Unusually, the cylinders were disposed in a three-bank triangle, with a crankshaft at each corner of the triangle.

Deltic (meaning "in the form of the Greek letter (capital) delta") is used to refer to both the Deltic E.130 opposed-piston, high-speed diesel engine and the locomotives produced by English Electric using these engines, including its demonstrator locomotive named DELTIC and the production version for British Railways, which designated these as the Class 55.

A single, half-sized, turbocharged Deltic power unit also featured in the English Electric-built Type 2 locomotive, designated as the Class 23. Both locomotive and engine became better known as the "Baby Deltic".

== History and design ==
The Deltic story began in 1943 when the British Admiralty set up a committee to develop a high-power, lightweight diesel engine for motor torpedo boats. Hitherto in the Royal Navy, such boats had been driven by petrol engines, but their highly flammable fuel made them vulnerable to fire, unlike diesel-powered E-boats.

Until this time, diesel engines had poor power-to-weight ratios and low speed. Before the war, Napier had been working on an aviation diesel design known as the Culverin after licensing versions of the Junkers Jumo 204. The Culverin was an opposed-piston, two-stroke design. Instead of each cylinder having a single piston and being closed at one end with a cylinder head, the Jumo-based design used an elongated cylinder containing two pistons moving in opposite directions towards the centre. This obviates the need for a heavy cylinder head, as the opposing piston filled this role. On the downside, the layout required separate crankshafts on each end of the engine that must be coupled through gearing or shafts. The primary advantages of the design were uniflow breathing and a rather "flat" engine.

The Admiralty required a much more powerful engine, and knew about Junkers' designs for multicrankshaft engines of straight-six and diamond forms. The Admiralty felt that these would be a reasonable starting point for the larger design that it required. The result was a triangle, the cylinder banks forming the sides, with crankshafts at each corner connected by phasing gears to a single output shaft—effectively three separate V-12 engines. The Deltic could be produced with varying numbers of cylinders; 9 and 18 were the most common, having either three or six cylinders per bank, respectively. In 1946, the Admiralty placed a contract with the English Electric Company, parent of Napier, to develop this engine.

One feature of the engine was the way that crankshaft-phasing was arranged to allow for exhaust port lead and inlet port lag. These engines are called "uniflow" designs, because the flow of gas into and out of the cylinder is one way, assisted by blowers to improve cylinder exhaust scavenging. The inlet/outlet port order is in/out/in/out/in/out going around the triangular ring (i.e. the inlet and outlet manifold arrangements have C_{3} rotational symmetry).

Earlier attempts at designing such an engine met with the difficulty of arranging the pistons to move in the correct manner, for all three cylinders in one delta, and this was the problem that caused Junkers Motorenbau to leave behind work on the delta-form while continuing to prototype a diamond-form, four-crankshaft, 24-cylinder Junkers Jumo 223. Herbert Penwarden, a senior draughtsman with the Admiralty Engineering Laboratory, suggested that one crankshaft needed to revolve anticlockwise to achieve the correct piston-phasing, so Napier designers produced the necessary gearing so one of them rotated in the opposite direction to the other two.

Being an opposed-piston design with no inlet or exhaust valves, and no ability to vary the port positions, the Deltic design arranged each crankshaft to connect two adjacent pistons operating in different cylinders in the same plane, using "fork and blade" connecting rods, the latter an "inlet" piston used to open and close the inlet port, and the former an "exhaust" piston in the adjacent cylinder to open and close the exhaust port. This would have led the firing in each bank of cylinders to be 60° apart, but arranging that each cylinder's exhaust piston would lead its inlet piston by 20° of crankshaft rotation was adopted. This allowed the exhaust port to be opened well before the inlet port, and allowed the inlet port to be closed after the exhaust port, which led to both good scavenging of exhaust gas and good volumetric efficiency for the fresh air charge. This required the firing events for adjacent cylinders to be 40° apart. For the 18-cylinder design, firing events could be interlaced over all six banks. This led to the even, buzzing exhaust note of the Deltic, with a charge ignition every 20° of crankshaft revolution, and a lack of torsional vibration, ideal for use in mine-hunting vessels. The 9-cylinder design, having three banks of cylinders, has its crankshafts rotating in the opposite direction. The exhaust lead of 20° is added to the 60° between banks, giving firing events for adjacent cylinders in the same bank 80° apart. Interlacing firing events over all three banks of cylinders still leads to an even buzzing exhaust note, and charge ignition occurring every 40° of crankshaft revolution with consequent reduction of torsional vibration.

Although the engine was cylinder-ported and required no poppet valves, each bank had a camshaft, driven at crankshaft speed. This was used solely to drive the fuel-injection pumps, each cylinder having its own injector and pump, driven by its own cam lobe.

== Uses ==
=== Naval service ===
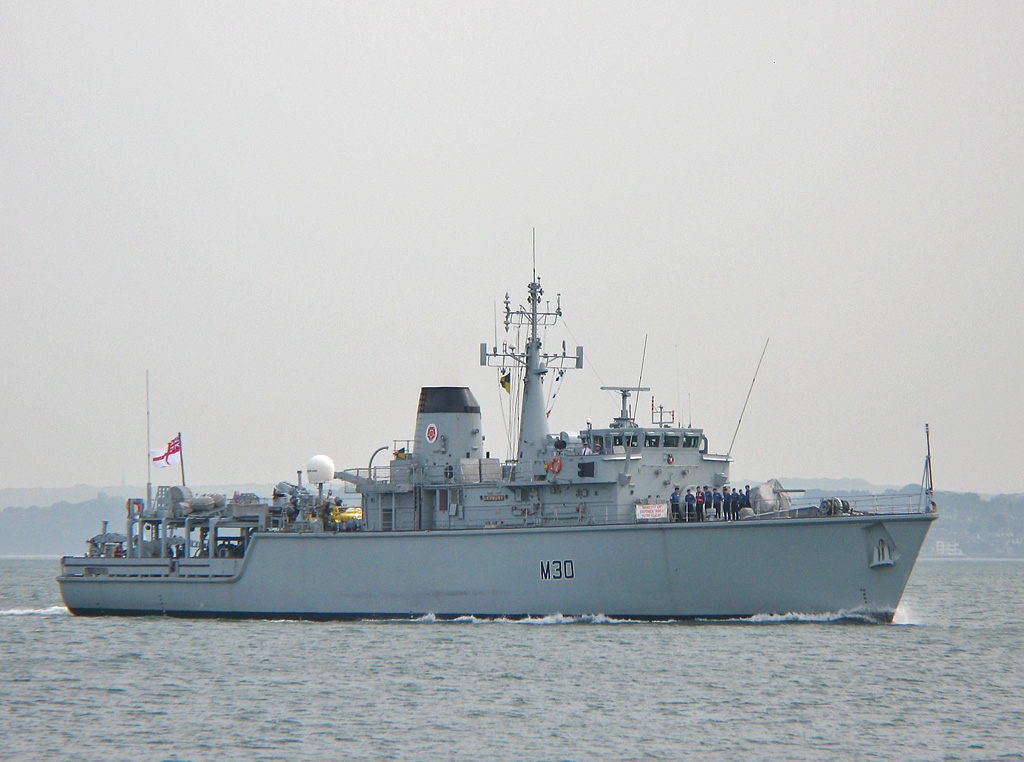
The Deltic-powered Hunt-class mine countermeasures vessel HMS Ledbury

Development began in 1947 and the first Deltic model was the D18-11B, produced in 1950. It was designed to produce 2,500 hp (1,900 kW) at 2000 rpm for a 15-minute rating; the continuous rating being 1,875 hp (1,398 kW) at 1700 rpm, based on a 10,000-hour overhaul or replacement life. By January 1952 six engines were available, enough for full development and endurance trials. A captured German E-Boat, S212 was selected as it was powered by Mercedes-Benz diesels with approximately the same power as the 18-cylinder Deltics. When two of the three Mercedes-Benz engines were replaced, the compactness of the Napier engines was graphically illustrated—they were half the size of the original engines and approximately one fifth the weight.

Proving successful, Deltic Diesel engines became a common power plant in small and fast naval craft. The Royal Navy used them first in the Dark-class fast attack craft. Subsequently they were used in a number of other smaller attack craft. Being largely of aluminium construction, their low magnetic signature allowed their use in mine countermeasures vessels and the Deltic was selected to power the Ton-class minesweepers. The Deltic engine was in service in some Hunt class until 2018. These versions are de-rated to reduce engine stress.

Deltic Diesels served in MTBs and PT boats built for other navies. Particularly notable was the Norwegian Tjeld or Nasty class, which was also sold to Germany, Greece, and the United States Navy. Nasty-class boats served in the Vietnam War, largely for covert operations.

Smaller nine-cylinder Deltic 9 engines were used as marine engines, notably by minesweepers. The Ton-class vessels were powered by a pair of Deltic 18s and used an additional Deltic 9 for power generation for their magnetic influence sweep. The Hunt class used three Deltic 9s, two for propulsion and again one for power generation, but this time with a hydraulic pump integrated to power bow-thrusters for slow-speed manœuvring, until a refurbishment programme by BAE Systems, that ran from 2010 to 2018, replaced the Deltic with Caterpillar C32 engines in the eight remaining commissioned Royal Navy vessels.

=== Railway use ===
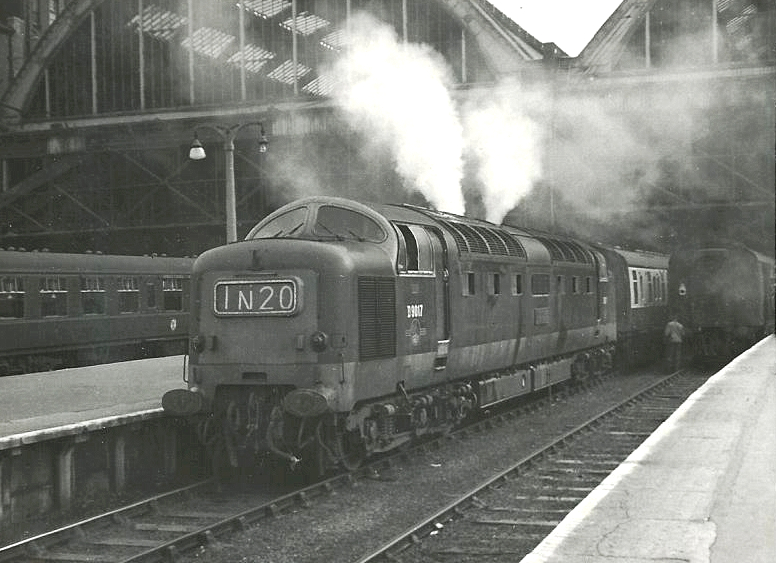
Napier-Deltic–powered British Rail Class 55 D9017 The Durham Light Infantry starting its engines at London King's Cross in 1966

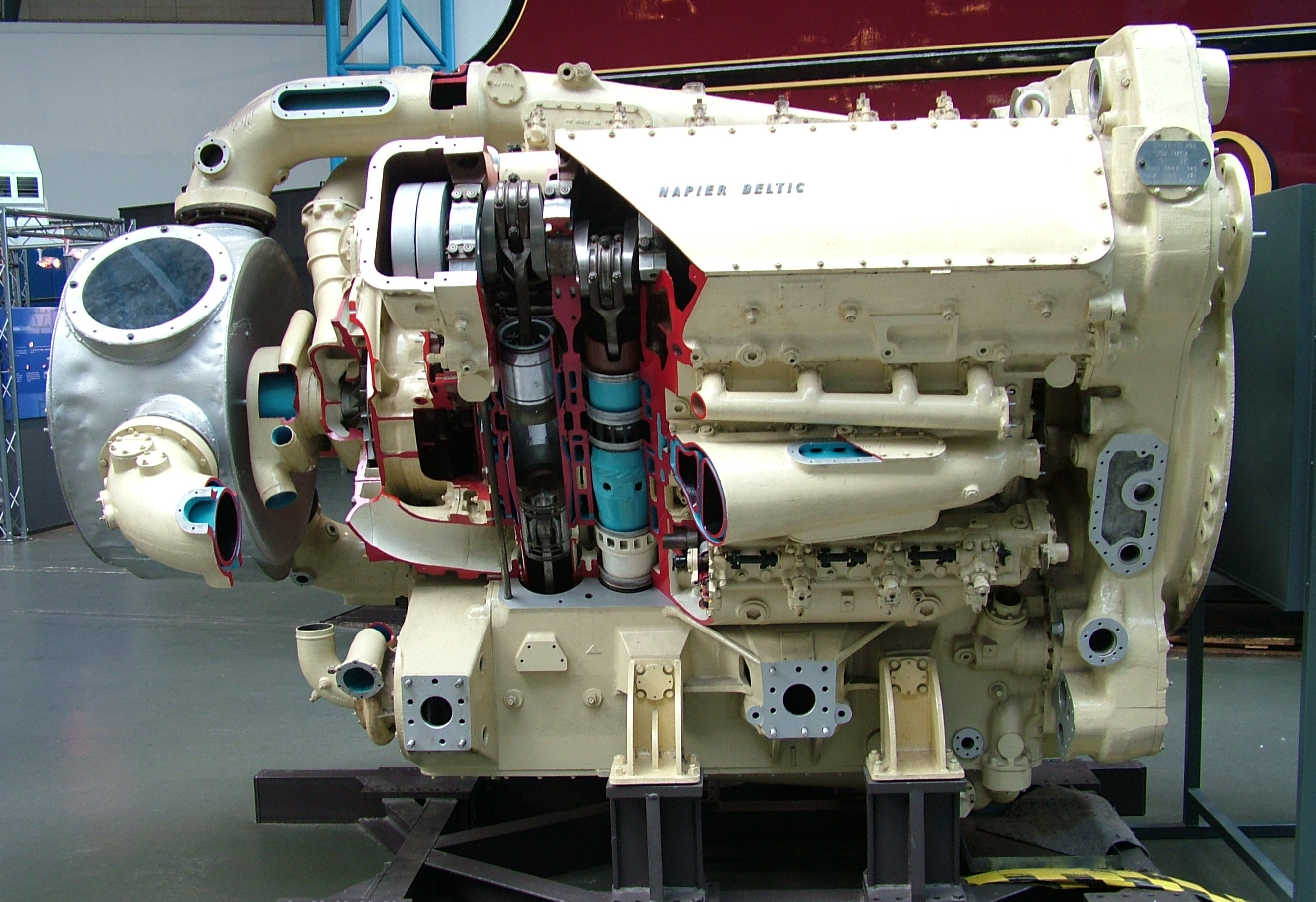
Napier Deltic engine at the National Railway Museum, York

Deltic engines were used in two types of British rail locomotive: the 1961–62 built class 55 and the 1959 built class 23. These locomotive types were known as Deltics and Baby Deltics, respectively.

The Class 55 used two D18-25 series II type V Deltic engines: mechanically blown 18-cylinder engines each rated at 1,650 hp (1,230 kW) continuous at 1500 rpm. The Class 23 used a single less powerful nine-cylinder turbocharged T9-29 Deltic of 1,100 hp (820 kW).

Six out of the original 22 Class 55 locomotives survive. Class leader D9000 Royal Scots Grey was returned to main line serviceable status in 1996. Following a power unit failure this locomotive was fitted, for a time, with an ex Royal Norwegian Navy T18-37K type, after various modifications were cleverly designed to make the new unit compatible.

=== Fire department use ===
The New York City Fire Department used a Napier Deltic engine to power their one-of-a-kind "Super Pumper System". This was a very-high-volume trailer-mounted fire pump with a separate tender.

=== Reliability in service ===
While the Deltic engine was successful in marine and rail use and very powerful for its size and weight, it was a highly strung unit, requiring careful maintenance. This led to a policy of unit replacement rather than repair in situ. Deltic engines were easily removed after breakdown, generally being sent back to the manufacturer for repair, although after initial contracts expired both the Royal Navy and British Railways set up their own workshops for overhauls.

== Turbo-compound Deltic ==
The "E.185" or "Compound Deltic" turbo-compound variant was planned and a single prototype was built in 1956 and tested in 1957. This capitalised on Napier's experience with both the "Nomad" and its increasing involvement with gas turbines. It used the Deltic as the gas generator inside a gas turbine, with both a twelve-stage axial compressor and a three-stage gas turbine. Unlike the Nomad, this turbine was not mechanically coupled to the crankshaft, but merely drove the compressor. It was hoped that it would produce 6,000 horsepower, with fuel economy and power-to-weight ratio "second to none". Predictions by the engineers closely connected with it were that connecting rod failure would be the limit on this power, failing at around 5,300 bhp. On test it actually produced 5,600 bhp before throwing a connecting rod through the crankcase just as predicted. Naval interest had waned by 1958 in favour of the pure gas turbine, despite its heavier fuel consumption, and no further development was carried out.

== Comparable engines ==
- Junkers Jumo 223 – a 24-cylinder opposed-piston diesel aircraft engine.
- Zvezda M503 – a 42-cylinder diesel radial engine for Soviet missile boats.
- Achates Power – an opposed-piston engine for road vehicles.
- Fairbanks Morse 38 8-1/8 diesel engine – an opposed-piston diesel submarine engine.

A patent for an engine, similar in complexity, but with variations of two or more crankshafts, was filed in 1930 by Wifredo Ricart.
