= Frank E. Evans =

Frank E. Evans may refer to:

- Frank Evans (general) (Frank Edgar Evans, 1876–1941), United States Marine Corps general
  - USS Frank E. Evans, a 1944 destroyer named after the general
- Frank Evans (politician) (Frank Edward Evans, 1923–2010), U.S. Representative from Colorado

== See also ==
- Frank Evans (disambiguation)
