= Frank Evans =

Frank Evans may refer to:

== Arts and entertainment ==
- Frank Evans (actor) (1849–1934), American silent film actor
- Frank Howel Evans (1867–1931), Welsh story paper author
- Frank Evans (guitarist) (1930–2007), British jazz guitarist

== Sports ==
- Frank Evans (rugby) (1897–1972), Welsh dual-code rugby player
- Frank Evans (baseball) (1921–2012), American Negro league baseball player
- Frank Evans (athlete) (1925–1996), British Olympic athlete
- Frank Evans (bullfighter) (born 1942), British-born bullfighter

== Others ==
- Frank Evans (general) (1876–1941), United States Marine Corps general
- Frank V. Evans (fl. 1896–1899), mayor of Birmingham, Alabama
- Thomas David Frank Evans (1917–1996), known as Frank Evans, British prisoner of war in World War II and author
- Frank Oliver Evans, (1884–1952), British merchant sailor and survivor of RMS Titanic disaster
- Frank Evans (politician) (1923–2010), U.S. Representative from Colorado

== Other uses ==
- USS Frank E. Evans, 1944 destroyer named for the US Marine Corps general
- Frank Evans High School, historic building in Spartanburg County, South Carolina

== See also ==
- Francis Evans (disambiguation)
