= Plane guard =

Carrier escort for recovering aircrew

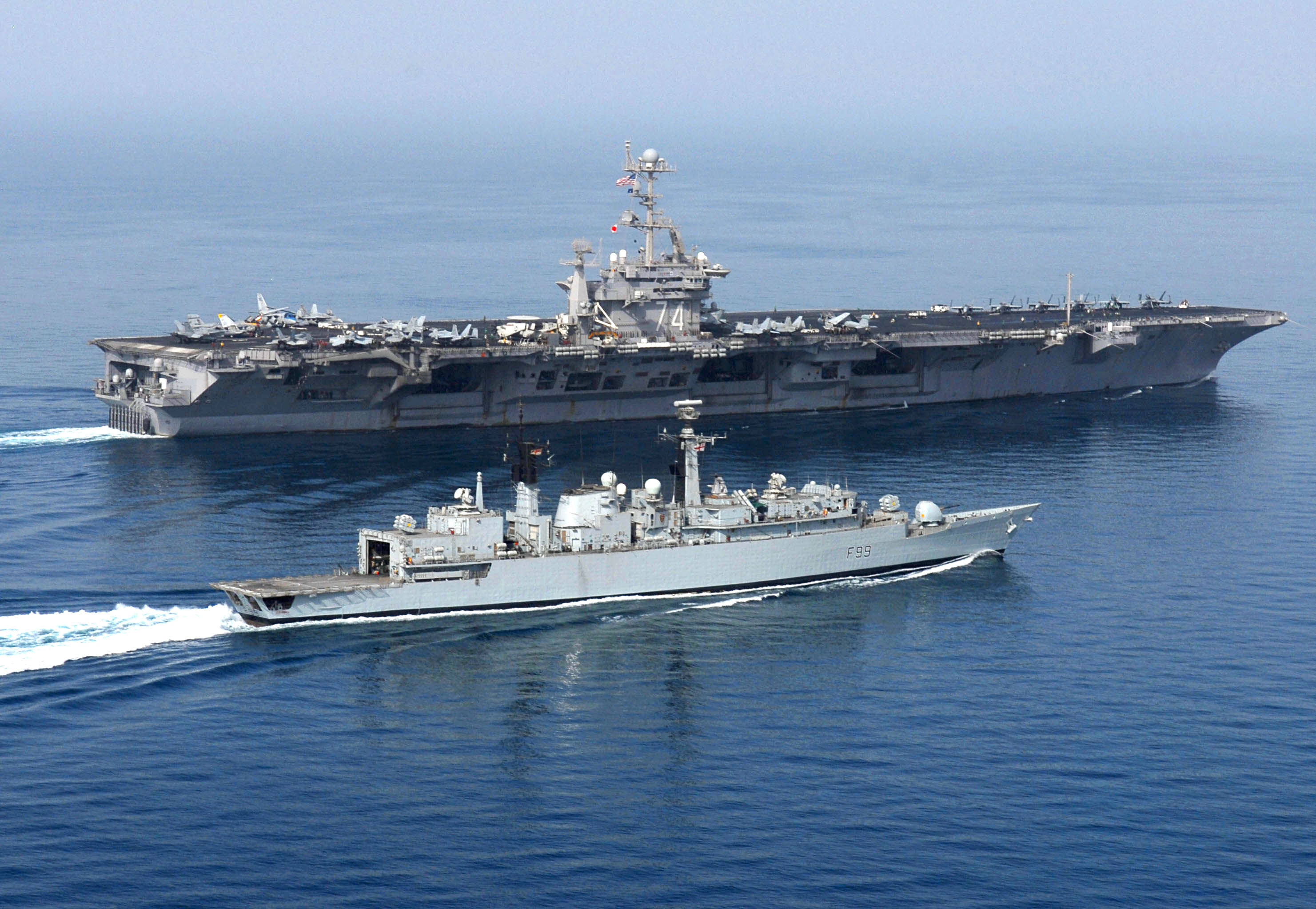
A British frigate providing plane guard support to a US aircraft carrier

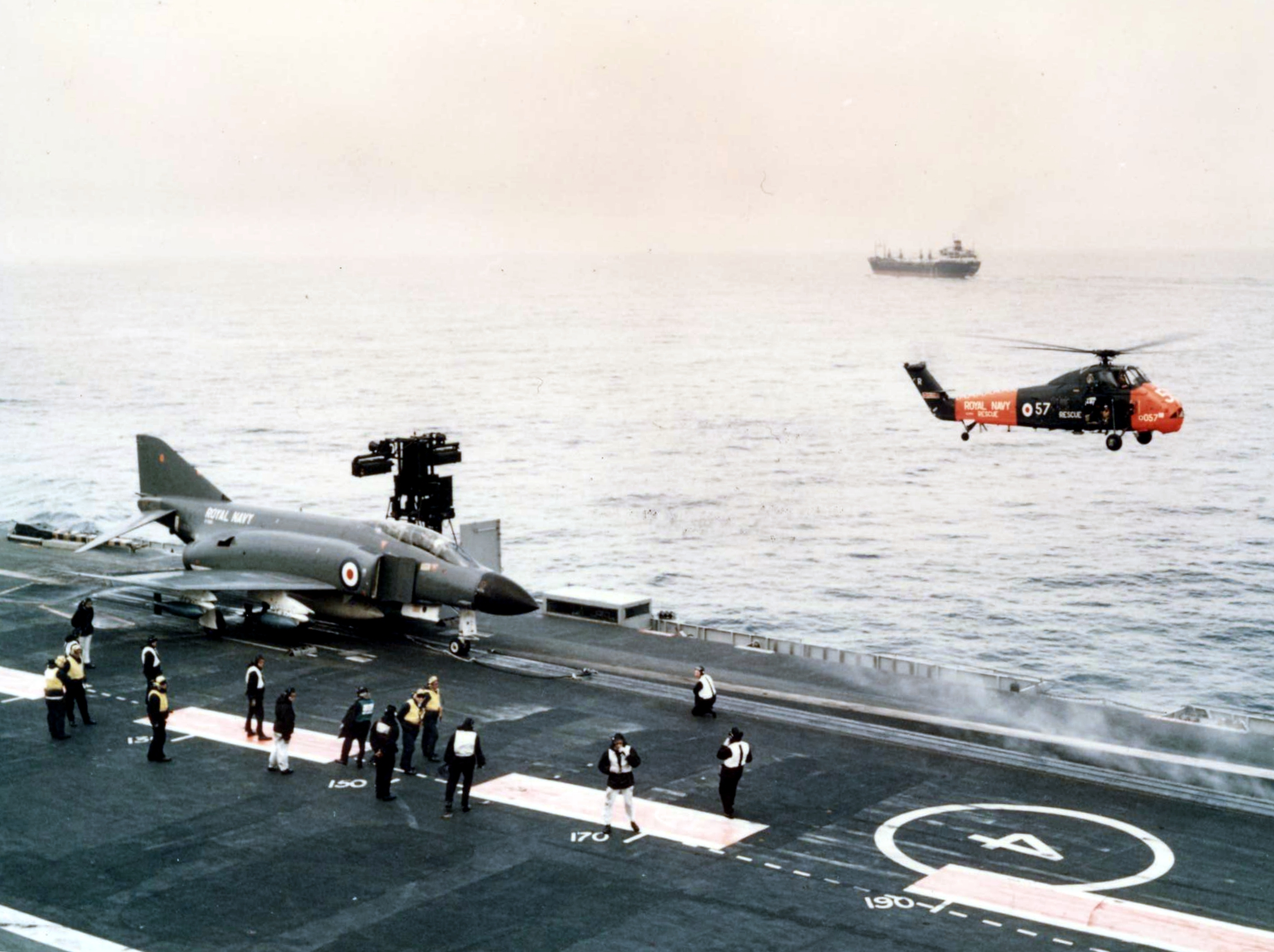
A Phantom FG.1 lines up on the catapult of HMS Ark Royal; a Wessex HAS.1 is airborne off the ship's port side on plane guard duty

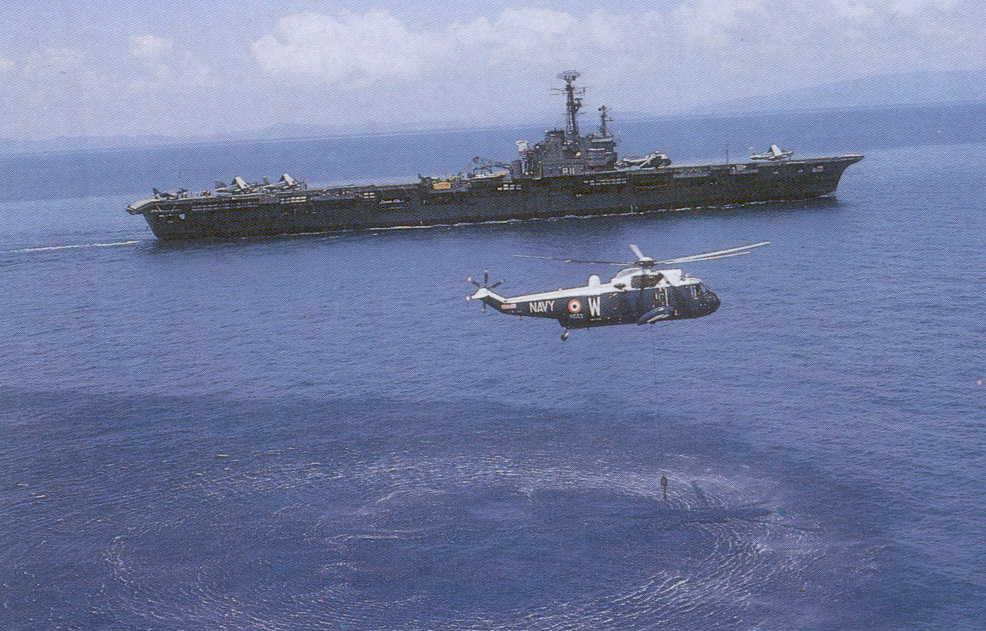
A Sea King helicopter acting as a plane guard with INS Vikrant

A plane guard is a warship (commonly a destroyer or frigate) or helicopter tasked to recover the aircrew of planes or helicopters which ditch or crash in the water during aircraft carrier flight operations.

== Ships ==
For ships, the plane guard is positioned at 500 to 2000 yards behind the carrier and either directly behind the carrier, or at a point 15 degrees off to starboard, intersecting the final approach line to angled deck carriers. The plane guard ship's position provides an additional point of reference to approaching aircraft. One of the ship's boats is prepared for launch and swung over the side, but not placed in the water. If an aircraft ditches or crashes, either while approaching the carrier to land or following a failed landing, the ship proceeds to the approximate position of the aircraft, and the prepared boat is deployed to rescue the aircrew.

The plane guard role is dangerous for ships, as aircraft carriers must often change speed and direction to preserve optimum take-off and landing conditions for their aircraft, and a lack of awareness or any incorrect manoeuvres on the part of either ship can place a plane guard ship under the bows of a carrier travelling at full speed. The USS Hobson was lost while incorrectly manoeuvering during plane guard duties which resulted in a collision with the aircraft carrier USS Wasp (in 1952). Both HMAS Voyager (in 1964) and USS Frank E. Evans (in 1969) were lost under similar circumstances in collisions with the Australian aircraft carrier HMAS Melbourne.

== Helicopters ==
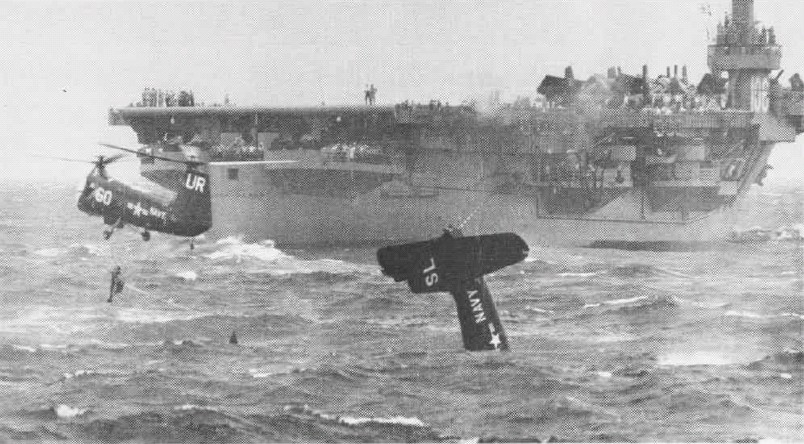
A U.S. Navy HUP Retriever plane guard conducting a rescue in 1953

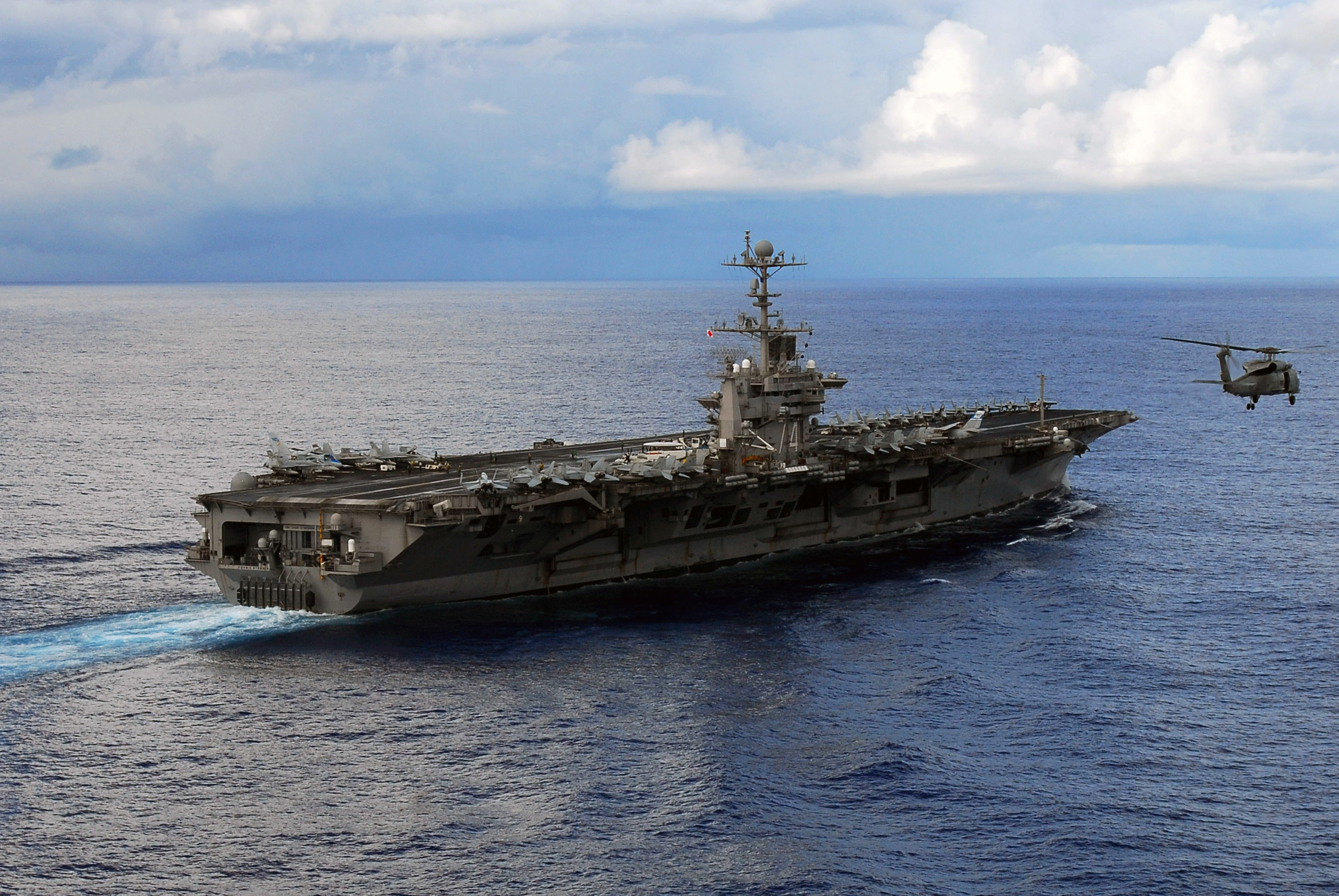
A United States Navy SH-60 Seahawk acts as plane guard during an exercise involving USS John C. Stennis.

After World War II, plane guard duties and search-and-rescue roles were sometimes carried out by amphibious aircraft. However, prior to the Korean War helicopters were discovered to be more efficient and effective in both roles. As helicopters came into more common usage, they supplemented and sometimes replaced plane guard ships, as they could retrieve crashed aircrew faster and more safely than ships. However, night operations still required a ship in the plane guard position.

== See also ==
- Index of aviation articles
- Lists of aviation topics
- List of established military terms
