= Francis Evans =

Francis Evans may refer to:

- Francis Evans (diplomat) (1897–1983), British ambassador to Israel and to Argentina
- Sir Francis Evans, 1st Baronet (1840–1907), British MP for Southampton 1888–1895, 1896–1900 and Maidstone 1901–1906
- Francis Evans Cornish (1831–1878), Canadian politician
- Francis Thomas Evans Sr. (1886–1974), pioneer aviator
- Francis C. Evans (1914–2002), American ecologist and professor of zoology
- Francis Evans (footballer) (born 2001), Australian rules footballer for the Carlton Football Club

== See also ==
- Frank Evans (disambiguation)
