= Melbourne–Evans collision =

1969 ship collision in the South China Sea

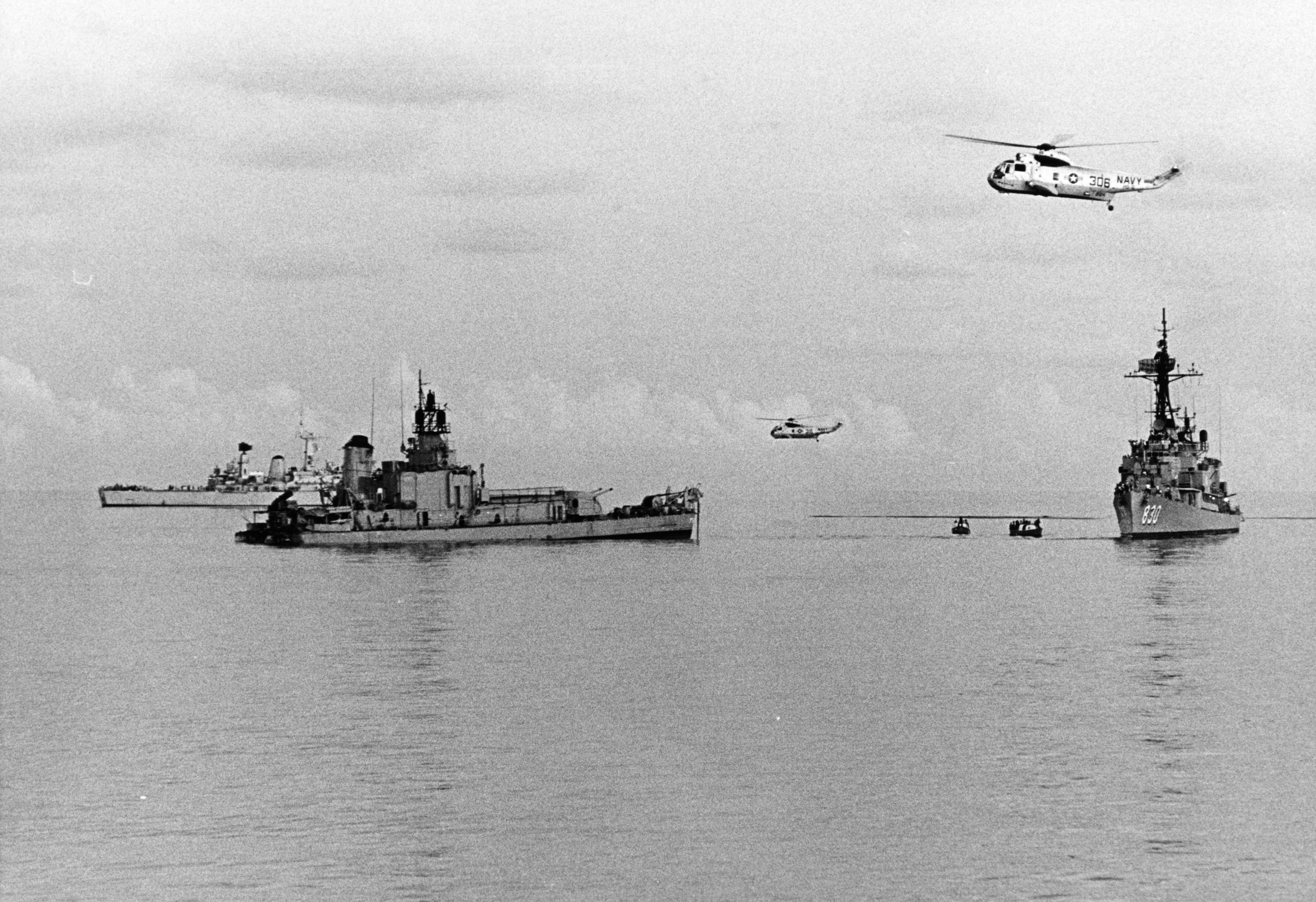
- The stern section of USS Frank E. Evans on the morning after the collision. USS Everett F. Larson (right) is moving in to salvage the remains of the abandoned destroyer.
- Date: 3 June 1969
- Place: South China Sea; 8°59.2′N 110°47.7′E
- Vessels involved: HMAS Melbourne (R21); USS Frank E. Evans (DD-754)
- Cause: Navigational error resulting in collision
- Result: USS Frank E. Evans sunk; 74 personnel aboard Evans killed; HMAS Melbourne damaged

The Melbourne–Evans collision was a collision between the light aircraft carrier HMAS Melbourne of the Royal Australian Navy (RAN) and the destroyer USS Frank E. Evans of the United States Navy (USN). On 3 June 1969, the two ships were participating in SEATO exercise Sea Spirit in the South China Sea. Around 3:00 am, when ordered to a new escort station, Evans sailed under Melbourne's bow, where she was cut in two. Seventy-four of Evans's crew were killed.

A joint RAN–USN board of inquiry was held to establish the events of the collision and the responsibility of those involved. This inquiry, which was believed by the Australians to be biased against them, found that both ships were at fault for the collision. Four officers (the captains of Melbourne and Evans, and the two junior officers in control of Evans at the time of the collision) were court-martialled based on the results of the inquiry; while the three USN officers were found guilty, the RAN officer was cleared of wrongdoing.

== Ships ==
HMAS Melbourne was the lead ship of the Majestic class of aircraft carriers. She was laid down for the Royal Navy on 15 April 1943, but construction was stopped at the end of the Second World War. She was sold to the Royal Australian Navy (RAN) in 1948, along with sister ship HMAS Sydney, but was heavily upgraded while construction was completed and did not enter service until the end of 1955. In 1964, Melbourne was involved in a collision with the Australian destroyer HMAS Voyager, sinking the smaller ship and killing 81 of her crew and one civilian dockyard worker.

USS Frank E. Evans was an Allen M. Sumner-class destroyer. She was laid down on 21 April 1944, and commissioned into the United States Navy (USN) on 3 February 1945. She served in the Second World War, the Korean War, and the Vietnam War, and had earned eleven battle stars.

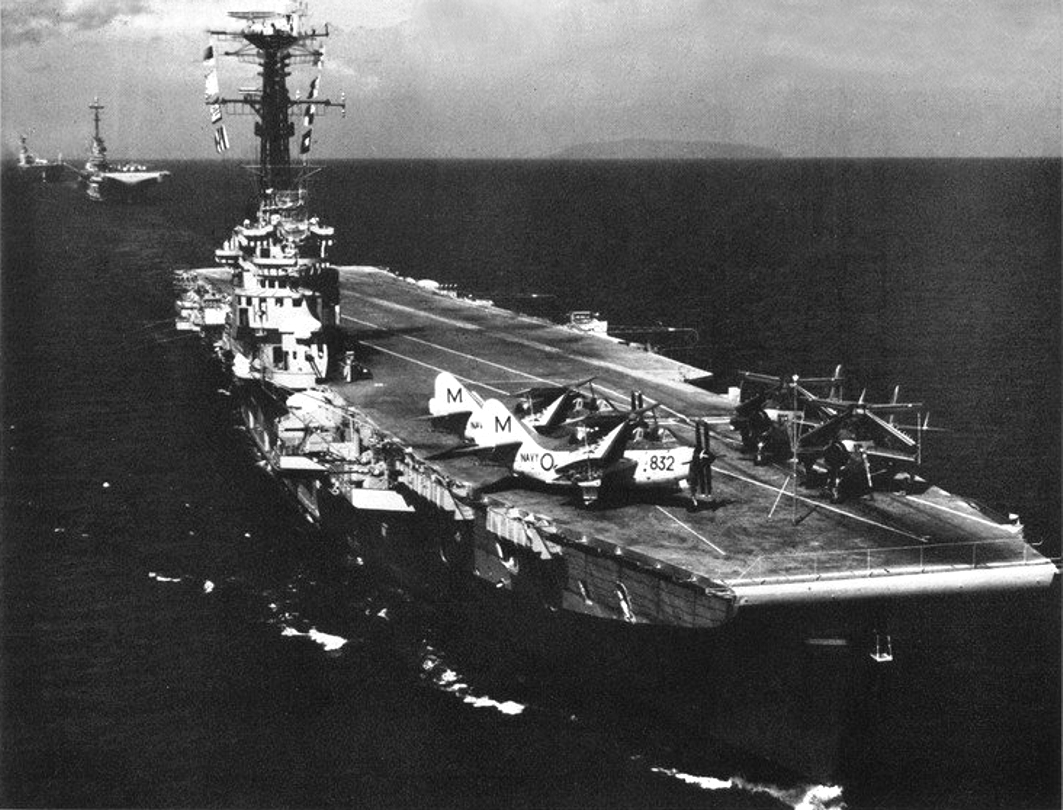
HMAS Melbourne

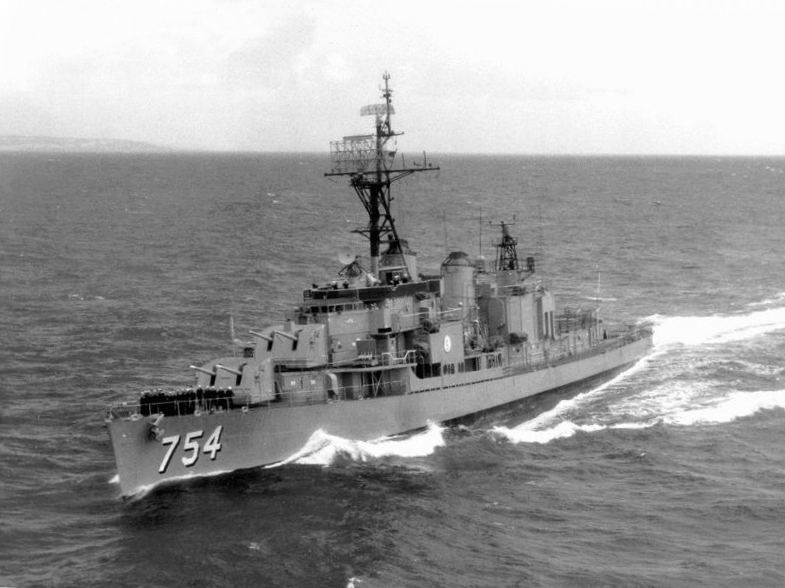
USS Frank E. Evans

== Lead up ==
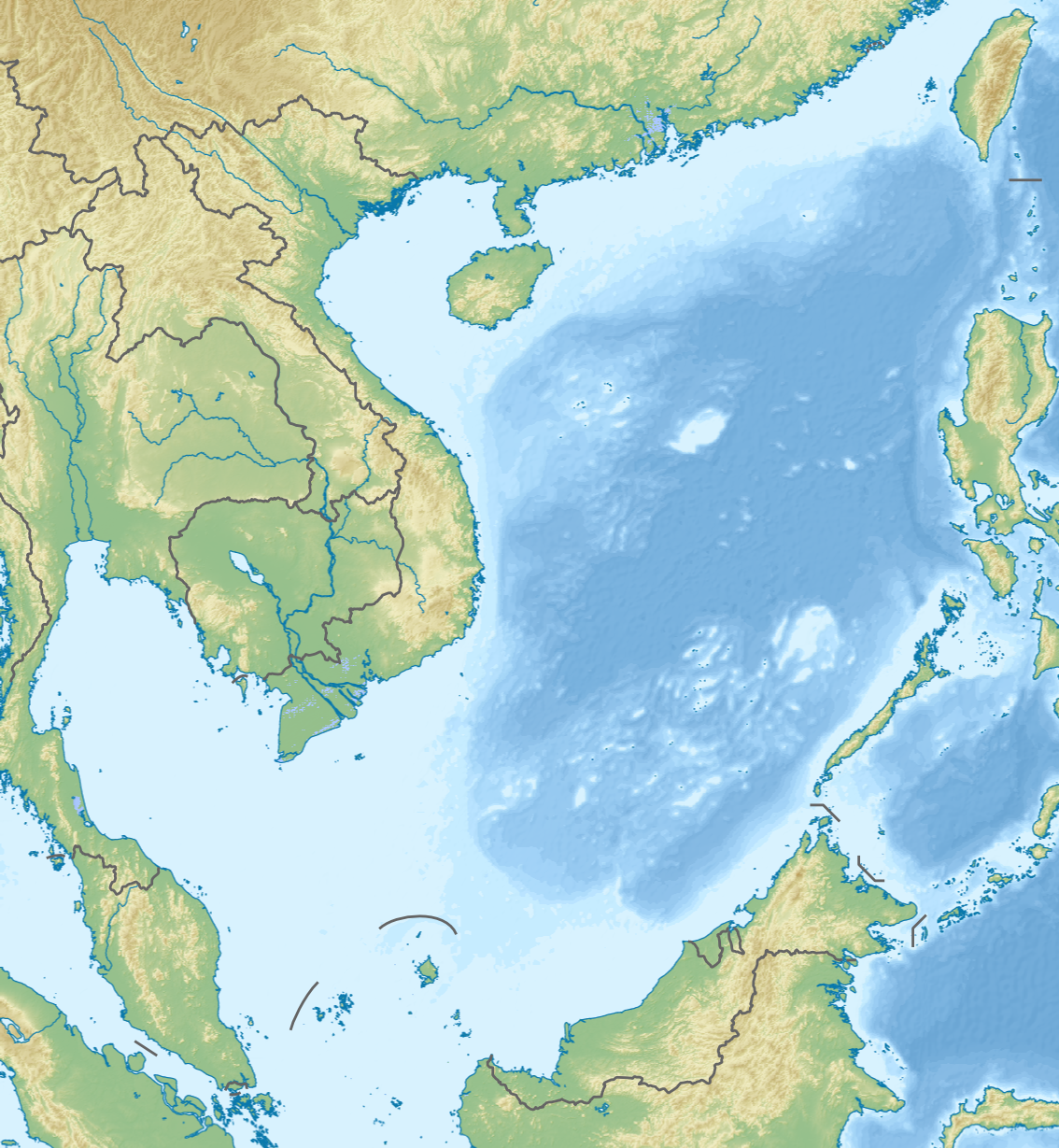
Location of the Melbourne–Frank E. Evans collision

Melbourne's commanding officer during SEATO's Sea Spirit exercise was Captain John Phillip Stevenson. Rear Admiral John Crabb, the Flag Officer Commanding Australian Fleet, was also embarked on the carrier. During Sea Spirit, Melbourne was assigned five escorts: the US destroyers Frank E. Evans, Everett F. Larson and James E. Kyes, and the frigates HMNZS Blackpool and HMS Cleopatra. Stevenson held a dinner for the five escort captains at the start of the exercise, during which he recounted the events of the Melbourne–Voyager collision, emphasised the need for caution when operating near the carrier, and provided written instructions on how to avoid such a situation developing again. Additionally, during the lead-up to the exercise, Crabb had strongly warned that all repositioning manoeuvres performed by the escorts had to commence with a turn away from Melbourne.

Despite these warnings, a near-miss occurred in the early hours of 31 May when Larson turned towards the carrier after being ordered to the plane guard station. Subsequent action narrowly prevented a collision. The escorts were again warned about the dangers of operating near the carrier and informed of Stevenson's expectations, while the minimum distance between carrier and escorts was increased from 2,000 to 3,000 yd (1,800 to 2,700 m).

== Collision ==
On the night of 2–3 June 1969, Melbourne and her escorts were involved in antisubmarine training exercises. In preparation for launching a Grumman S-2 Tracker aircraft, Stevenson ordered Evans to the plane guard station, reminded the destroyer of Melbourne's course, and instructed the carrier's navigation lights to be brought to full brilliance. This was the fourth time that Evans had been asked to assume this station that night, and the previous three manoeuvres had been without incident.

Evans was positioned on Melbourne's port bow, but began the manoeuvre by turning starboard, towards the carrier. A radio message was sent from Melbourne to Evans's bridge and combat information centre, warning the destroyer that she was on a collision course, which Evans acknowledged. Seeing the destroyer take no action and on a course to place herself under Melbourne's bow, Stevenson ordered the carrier hard to port, signalling the turn by both radio and siren blasts. At approximately the same time, Evans turned hard to starboard to avoid the approaching carrier. It is uncertain which ship began to manoeuvre first, but each ship's bridge crew claimed that they were informed of the other ship's turn after they commenced their own. After having narrowly passed in front of Melbourne, the turns quickly placed Evans back in the carrier's path. Melbourne hit Evans amidships at 3:15 am, cutting the destroyer in two.

The paths taken by HMAS Melbourne and USS Frank E. Evans in the minutes leading up to the collision

Melbourne stopped immediately after the collision and deployed her boats, liferafts and lifebuoys, before carefully maneuvering alongside the stern section of Evans. Sailors from both ships used mooring lines to lash the stern to Melbourne, allowing the carrier to evacuate the survivors in that section. Evans's severed bow section sank quickly; the majority of those killed were believed to have been trapped within. Members of Melbourne's crew dived into the water to rescue overboard survivors close to the carrier, while the carrier's boats and helicopters collected those farther out. Clothing, blankets and beer were provided to survivors from the carrier's stores, some RAN sailors offered their own uniforms, and the ship's band was instructed to set up on the flight deck to entertain and distract the USN personnel. All of the survivors were located within twelve minutes of the collision and rescued before half an hour had passed, although the search continued for fifteen more hours.

Seventy-four of the 273 crew on Evans were killed. It was later learned that Evans's commanding officer, Commander Albert S. McLemore, was asleep in his quarters at the time of the incident, and charge of the vessel was held by lieutenants Ronald Ramsey and James Hopson; the former had failed the qualification exam to stand watch, while the latter was at sea for the first time.

=== Post-collision events ===
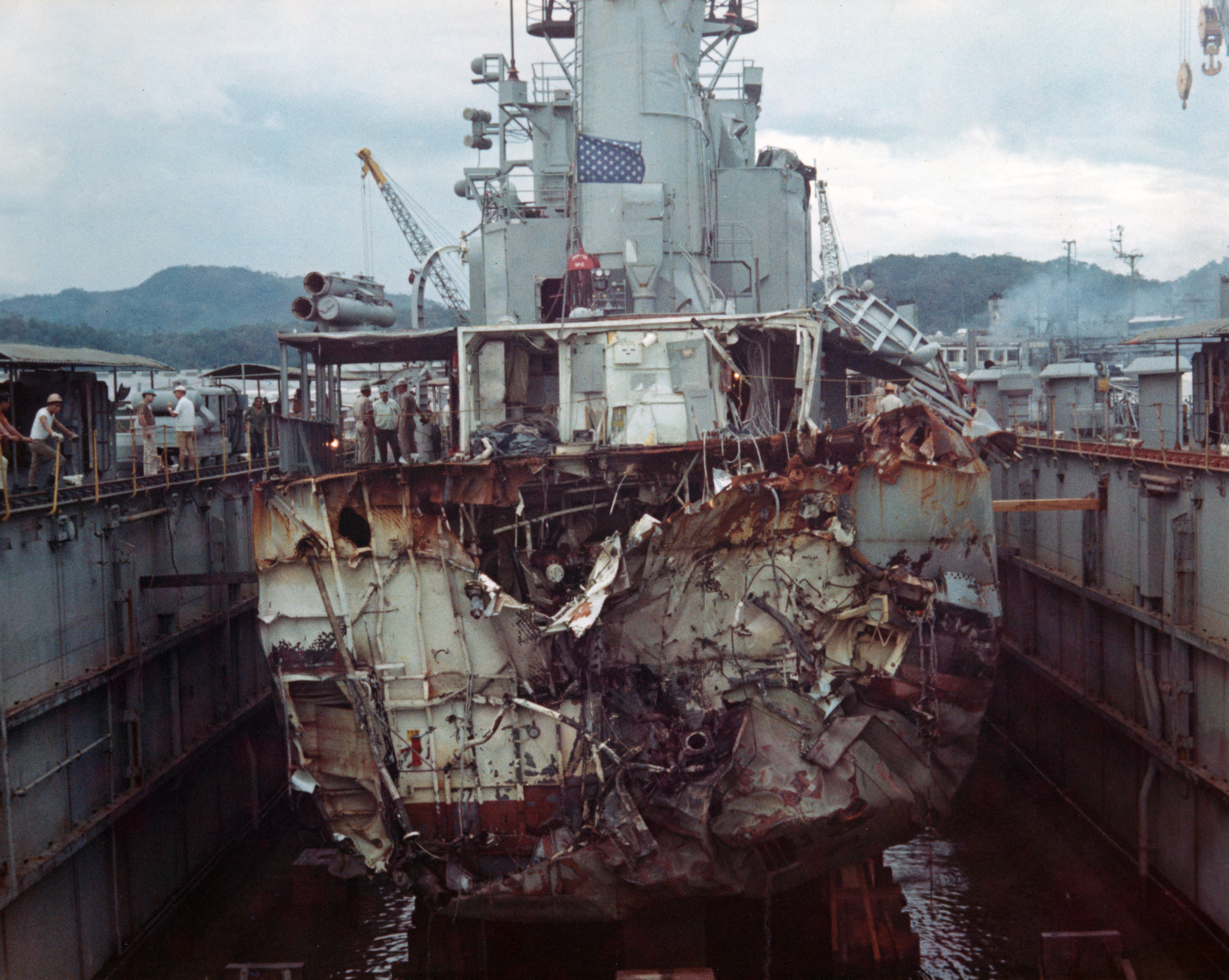
USS Frank E. Evans in the auxiliary repair drydock USS Windsor at Subic Bay in the Philippines

Following the evacuation of Evans's stern, the section was cast off while the carrier moved away to avoid damage, but against expectations it failed to sink. The stern was recovered and towed by fleet tug USS Tawasa to Subic Bay, Philippines, arriving there on 9 June. After being stripped for parts, the hulk was decommissioned on 1 July, and was later sunk when used for target practice.

Melbourne travelled to Singapore, arriving on 6 June, where she received temporary repairs to her bow. The carrier departed on 27 June and arrived in Sydney on 9 July, where she remained until November docked at Cockatoo Island Dockyard for repairs and installation of the new bow.

817 Squadron RAN, which was responsible for the Westland Wessex helicopters embarked on Melbourne at the time of the collision, later received a USN Meritorious Unit Commendation for its rescue efforts. Five other decorations were presented to Australian personnel in relation to the rescue of Evans's crew: one George Medal, one Member of the Order of the British Empire (MBE), one Air Force Cross, and two British Empire Medals. Fifteen additional commendations for gallantry were awarded by the Australian Naval Board.

== Joint board of inquiry ==
A joint RAN–USN board of inquiry was established to investigate the incident, following the passing of special regulations allowing the presence of Australian personnel at a US inquiry. The board was in session for over 100 hours between 9 June and 14 July, with 79 witnesses interviewed: 48 USN, 28 RAN, and three from other navies.

The board was made up of six officers. The RAN representatives were Rear Admiral David Stevenson (no relation to Melbourne's Captain Stevenson), Captain Ken Shards, and Captain John Davidson. The USN officers were captains S. L. Rusk and C. B. Anderson. Presiding over the board was USN Rear Admiral Jerome King, a posting that was controversial as he was the commanding officer of both the forces involved in Sea Spirit and the fleet unit to which Evans normally belonged, and was seen during the inquiry to be biased against Captain Stevenson and other RAN personnel. King's attitude, performance, and conflict of interest were criticised by the Australians present at the inquiry and the press, and his handling of the inquiry was seen as detrimental to Australia–United States relations.

Despite admissions by members of the USN, given privately to personnel in other navies, that the incident was entirely the fault of Evans, significant attempts were made to reduce the US destroyer's culpability and place at least partial blame for the incident on Melbourne. At the beginning of the inquiry, King banned one of the RAN legal advisers from attending, even as an observer. He regularly intervened for American witnesses but failed to do so on similar matters for the Australians. Testimony on the collision and the subsequent rescue operation was to be given separately, and although requests by American personnel to give both sets of testimony at the same time in order to return to their duties were regularly granted, the same request made by Stevenson was denied by King. Testimony of members of the RAN had to be given under oath, and witnesses faced intense questioning from King, despite the same conditions not applying to USN personnel. There was also a heavy focus on the adequacy of Melbourne's navigational lighting. Mentions of the near miss with Larson were interrupted with the instruction that those details could be recounted at a later time, but the matter was never raised by the board.

The unanimous decision of the board was that although Evans was partially at fault for the collision, Melbourne had contributed by not taking evasive action sooner, even though doing this would have been a direct contravention of international sea regulations, which stated that in the lead-up to a collision the larger ship was required to maintain course and speed. The report was inconsistent in several areas with the evidence given at the inquiry, including the falsity that Melbourne's navigational lights took significant time to come to full brilliance. Several facts were also edited out of the transcripts of the inquiry.

== Courts-martial ==
=== Stevenson ===
Stevenson was informed on 29 July of the result, although not the details, and was told that a court-martial charging him for his role in the incident might be required. Two charges of negligence—for failing to explicitly instruct Evans to change course to avoid collision and for failing to set Melbourne's engines to full astern—were laid on 15 August, with the court-martial held from 20 to 25 August. Evidence presented during the hearing showed that going full astern would have made no difference to the collision, and on the matter of the failing-to-instruct charge the presiding judge advocate concluded that reasonable warning had been given to the destroyer and asked, "What was [Stevenson] supposed to do—turn his guns on them?". Of the evidence and testimony given at the court-martial, nothing suggested that Stevenson had done anything wrong; instead it was claimed that he had done everything reasonable to avoid collision, and had done it correctly.

The reasons for the court-martial given by historians vary. One reason suggested was that it was to appease the USN, which had court-martialled three officers from Evans and had threatened to prevent US ships from operating as part of Australian-led forces if no action was taken against Stevenson. The other view is that the court-martial was used in an attempt to clear Stevenson's name and to allow the RAN to distance itself from the findings of the joint board of inquiry.

Stevenson's defence submitted that there was "no case to answer", resulting in the dropping of both charges, and the verdict of "honourably acquitted". Despite the findings, Stevenson's next posting was as chief of staff to a minor flag officer; seen by him as a demotion in all but name. The posting had been decided upon before the court-martial and was announced while Stevenson was out of the country for the courts-martial of Evans's officers; he did not learn about it until his return to Australia. Following the events—publicly considered to be another scapegoating of a commanding officer of Melbourne (the first enquiry into the Melbourne-Voyager collision had laid significant blame on Captain John Robertson, the ship's commanding officer at the time)—Stevenson requested retirement, as he did not wish to serve under people he no longer respected. This retirement was initially denied, but was later permitted.

=== McLemore, Ramsey and Hopson ===
Commander Albert S. McLemore and lieutenants Hopson and Ramsey also faced courts-martial for their contributions to the collision. Hopson and Ramsey both pleaded guilty to charges of dereliction of duty and negligence, and had their positions in the promotion list moved down. McLemore, who pleaded not guilty to the charges against him, was found guilty of dereliction of duty and negligently hazarding his ship. The formal reprimand effectively ended his naval career.

In 1999, McLemore publicly accepted that the collision was his responsibility, as he had left two inexperienced officers with the con of his ship.

== Aftermath ==
A training film, I Relieve You, Sir, was developed by the USN for junior watchkeeping officers. Based on the events of the collision, the film demonstrates the responsibility junior watchkeeping officers hold, and the potential consequences of failing to do their job.

Unlike other naval casualties during the Vietnam War, the names of the 74 Evans crew killed are not inscribed on the Vietnam Veterans Memorial. Despite operating in Vietnamese waters immediately before deployment to Sea Spirit, and being scheduled to return to activities supporting the war effort after the exercise, it was determined that as Sea Spirit was not directly linked with US operations in Vietnam, and the exercise took place outside the geographical limit for the conflict as defined by the outer edge of Market Time operations, the crew was ineligible for inclusion on the wall. Exceptions to the geographic limit rule have been made for other personnel killed as part of the conflict but not in Vietnam itself; for example those involved in operations in Laos, and those dying in transit to or from Vietnam. However, an act of Congress specifically permitting the inclusion of their names on the memorial is required: legislation to have those killed in the Melbourne–Evans collision has been introduced on several occasions, but has so far failed to gather sufficient support.

A memorial to the collision is located in Niobrara, Nebraska, United States. The memorial specifically commemorates the three Sage brothers, all of whom were aboard Evans and were killed in the collision. They were the first group of siblings permitted to serve on the same ship since the Second World War, a result of the policy introduced when the five Sullivan brothers were killed following the sinking of USS Juneau. Collision survivors and family members of Evans personnel have held annual reunions to memorialise the accident. Australian sailors who served on Melbourne often attend.

A second memorial was erected on the grounds of Warren Cemetery in Gurnee, Illinois. On a large tablet, it lists the names of all 74 crew members killed aboard the Frank E. Evans. A smaller tablet has the names of the three crew members from Illinois inscribed on the back, and it is one of the sites where an annual memorial service takes place on June 3 every year. Survivors and family members typically attend, along with members of the public and local officials.

Frank E. Evans embarked on her last voyage from Long Beach, California, in March, 1969. The names of her 74 crew killed are inscribed under a flagpole at Long Beach Shoreline Marina.

In December 2012, Stevenson announced that his son had received a letter from the Australian minister for defence, Stephen Smith, saying that he was "not treated fairly" by the government of the day and by the RAN. It also said, "Your father was a distinguished naval officer who served his country with honour in peace and war ... Should your father have continued his naval career, the Chief of Navy advises me that he would undoubtedly have been competitive for flag rank." Stevenson also said that he was supported throughout his ordeal by his wife, who had died just five months before the letter arrived.

In March 2014, retired RAN officer David Ferry, in writing about the Melbourne-Voyager collision, included a section on related Melbourne-Evans experience and some aspects of its joint board of inquiry.

In September 2014 American journalist Louise Esola published American Boys: The True Story of the Lost 74 of the Vietnam War, which chronicles the lives of the 74 men killed on the USS Frank E. Evans and the efforts by survivors and families to have the men memorialized on the Vietnam Veterans Memorial in Washington, D.C.

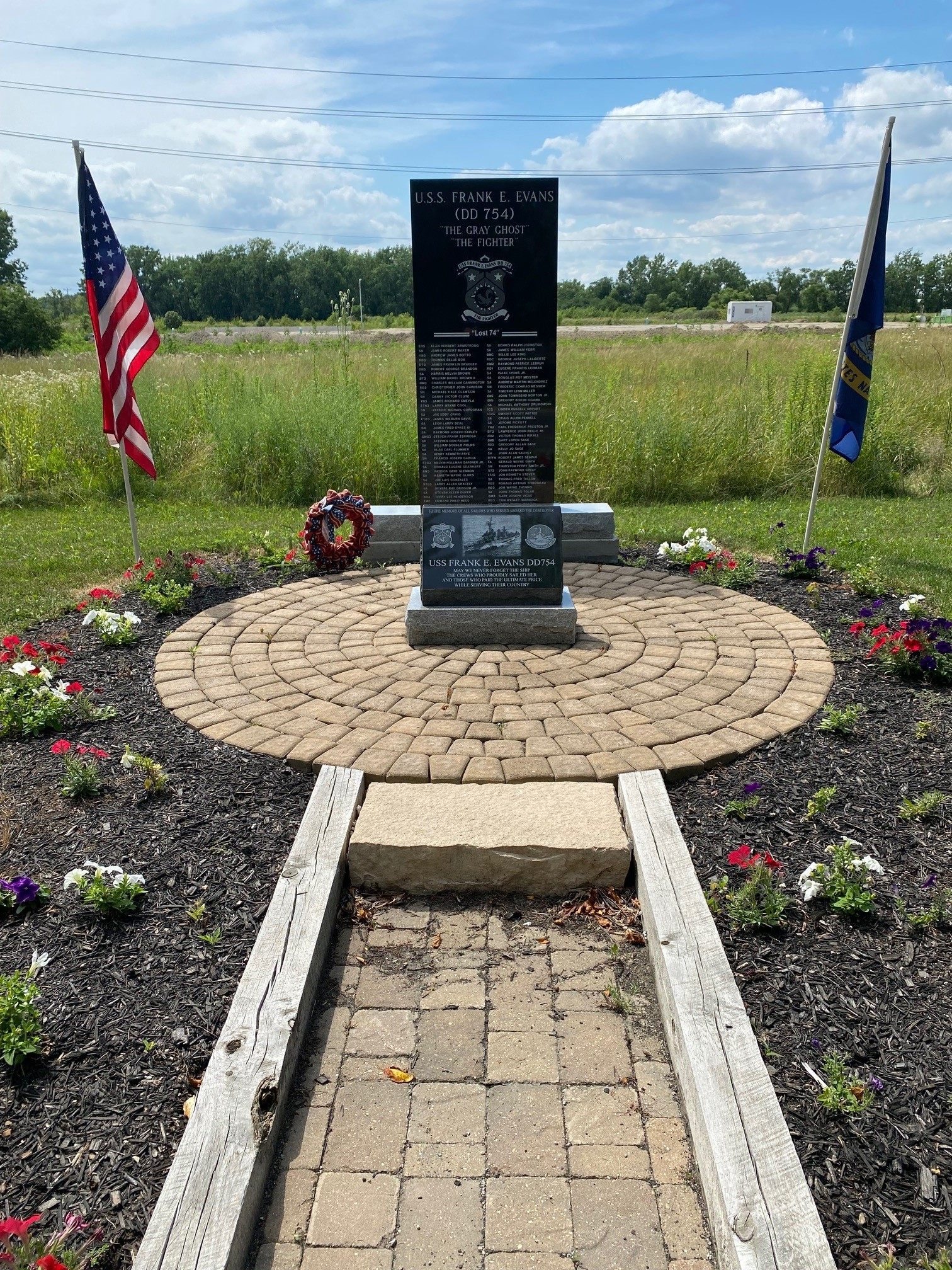
Full memorial, USS Frank E. Evans memorial located in Warren Cemetery, Gurnee, Illinois

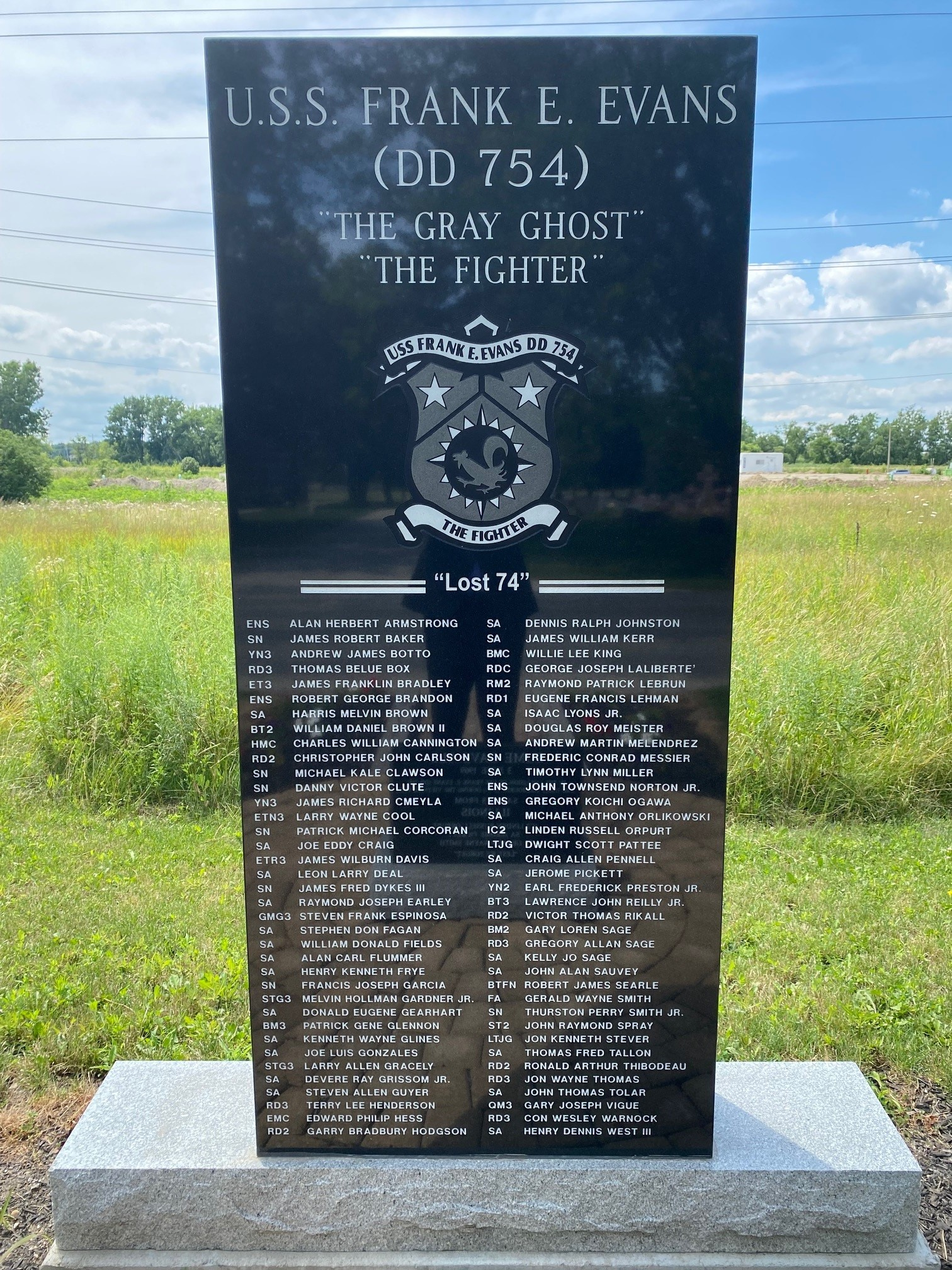
Large tablet, USS Frank E. Evans memorial located in Warren Cemetery, Gurnee, Illinois

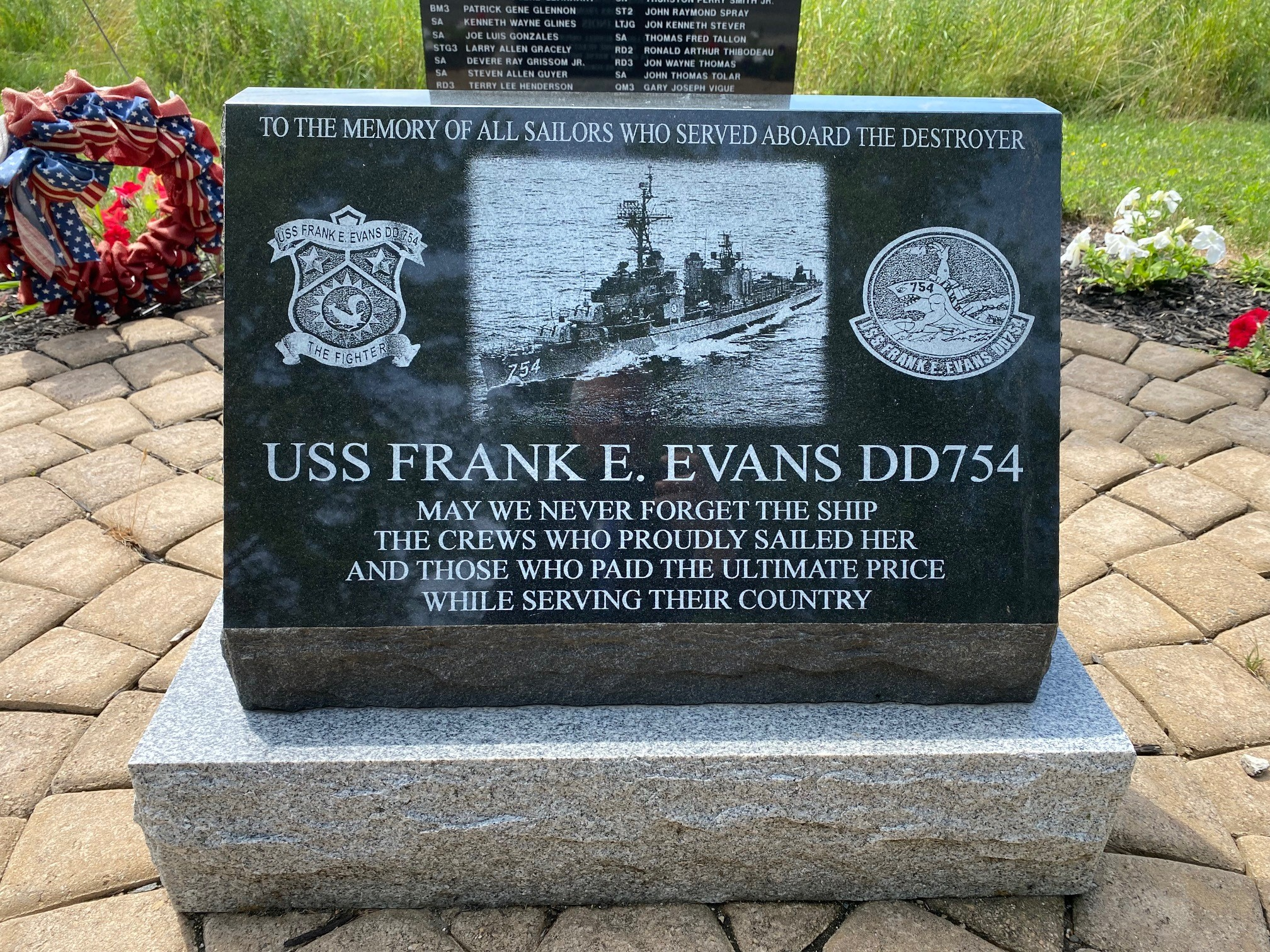
Small tablet front, USS Frank E. Evans memorial located in Warren Cemetery, Gurnee, Illinois

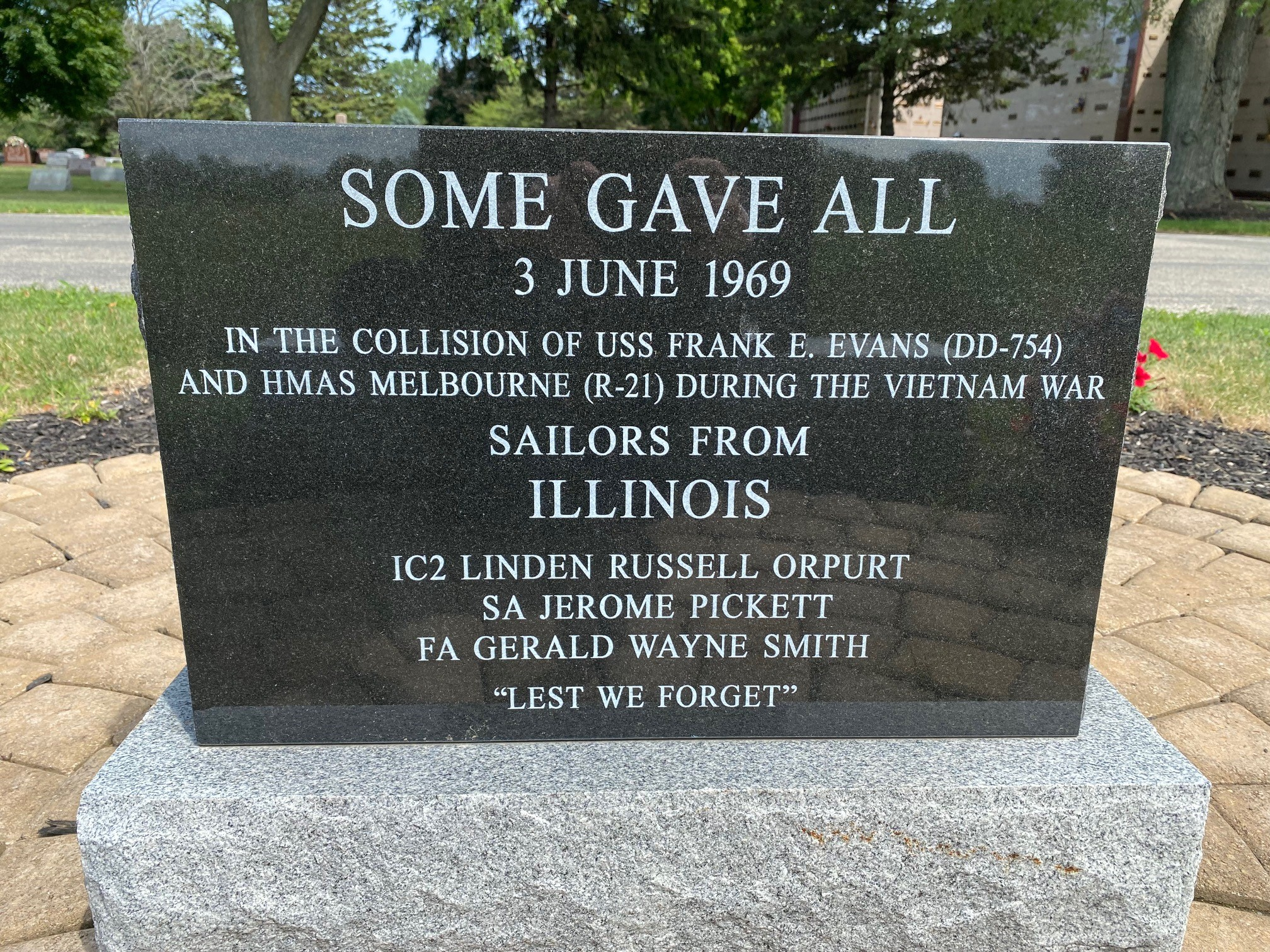
Small tablet back including names of sailors from Illinois, USS Frank E. Evans memorial located in Warren Cemetery, Gurnee, Illinois
