= Melbourne–Voyager collision =

1964 collision between two Royal Australian Navy warships in Jervis Bay, Australia

- Date: 10 February 1964
- Place: Jervis Bay, New South Wales, Australia
- Vessels involved: HMAS Melbourne; HMAS Voyager
- Cause: Navigational error resulting in collision
- Result: Voyager sunk; 14 officers, 67 sailors, and 1 civilian aboard Voyager killed; Melbourne damaged

The Melbourne–Voyager collision, also known as the Melbourne–Voyager incident or simply the Voyager incident, was a collision between two warships of the Royal Australian Navy (RAN): the aircraft carrier HMAS Melbourne and the destroyer HMAS Voyager.

On the evening of 10 February 1964, the two ships were performing manoeuvres off Jervis Bay. Melbourne's aircraft were performing flying exercises, and Voyager had been given the task of plane guard. After a series of turns, Voyager was ordered to resume its position behind Melbourne. Instead, Voyager turned to port across the carrier's path, and a collision became inevitable.

Melbourne struck Voyager at 20:56, with the carrier's bow striking just behind the bridge and cutting the destroyer in two. Of the 314 aboard Voyager, 82 were killed. Melbourne, although damaged, suffered no fatalities.

The RAN proposed a board of inquiry to investigate the collision, but a full royal commission was established. The Royal Commission, headed by Sir John Spicer, concluded that Voyager was primarily at fault for failing to maintain effective situational awareness, but also criticised Melbourne's captain, John Robertson, and his officers.

Increasing pressure over the results of the first Royal Commission, along with allegations that Captain Duncan Stevens was unfit for command, prompted a second Royal Commission in 1967. It was the only time in Australian history that two Royal Commissions had been held to investigate the same incident. The second Royal Commission found that Stevens was unfit to command for medical reasons.

== Ships ==
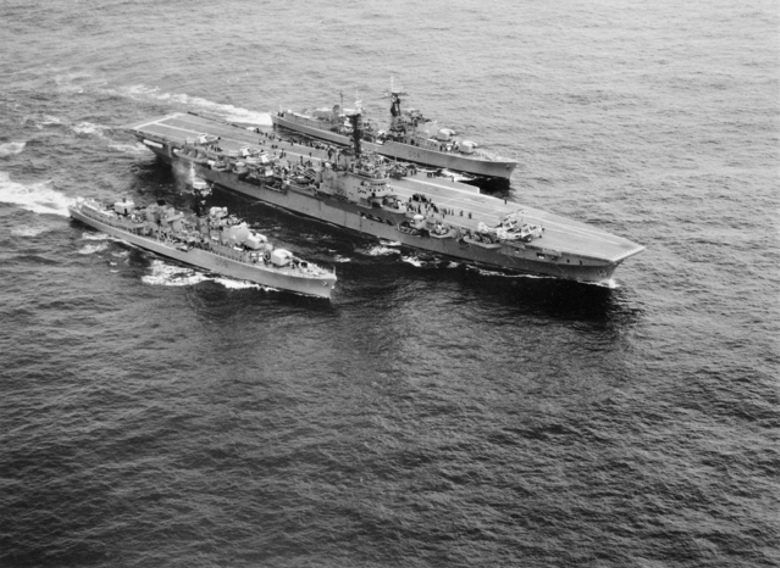
HMAS Melbourne underway with the Daring-class destroyers Vendetta (D08, bottom) and Voyager (D04, top) in 1959

=== HMAS Melbourne ===
HMAS Melbourne was the lead ship of the Majestic-class of light fleet aircraft carriers. She was laid down for the Royal Navy on 15 April 1943 at Vickers-Armstrongs' Naval Construction Yard in Barrow-in-Furness, England, and launched on 28 February 1945. Work was suspended at the end of World War II, and did not resume until the Australian government purchased her and sister ship HMAS Sydney in 1947. Melbourne was heavily upgraded to operate jet aircraft, and was only the third aircraft carrier in the world to be constructed with an angled flight deck. The carrier was commissioned into the RAN on 28 October 1955.

The carrier was 701 feet 5 inches (213.79 m) long, had a displacement of 15,740 tons, and could reach a speed of 24 knots (44 km/h; 28 mph). The carrier's air group consisted of de Havilland Sea Venom fighter-bombers, Fairey Gannet anti-submarine aircraft, and Westland Wessex helicopters. Melbourne underwent her annual refit from 16 September 1963 to 20 January 1964, with command handed over to Captain John Robertson in early January.

=== HMAS Voyager ===
HMAS Voyager was the first of three Australian-built Daring-class destroyers. The first all-welded ship built in Australia, Voyager was laid down by Cockatoo Island Dockyard in Sydney on 10 October 1949, launched on 1 May 1952, and commissioned into the RAN on 12 February 1957.

At 390 feet (120 m) in length, Voyager displaced 2,800 tons (standard), and had a maximum speed of 33 kn (61 km/h). After returning to Australia in August 1963, after a deployment to the Far East Strategic Reserve, Voyager was sent to Williamstown Naval Dockyard for refitting. Captain Duncan Stevens was appointed commanding officer at the end of that year. The refit was completed in late January 1964.

== Collision ==
On 9 February 1964, both ships arrived at Jervis Bay for post-refit trials. During the day of 10 February the ships operated independently, or exercised with the British submarine HMS Tabard. That evening, while 20 nautical miles (37 km; 23 mi) south-east of Jervis Bay, Melbourne was performing night flying exercises, while Voyager was acting as the carrier's plane guard escort; tasked with rescuing the crew from any aircraft that crashed or ditched. This required Voyager to maintain a position astern of and to port of Melbourne at a distance of 1,500 to 2,000 yards (1,400 to 1,800 m). As aircraft carriers head into the wind to provide maximum assistance for takeoffs, their course can vary widely and on short notice; bridge teams aboard escorting destroyers must thus remain alert at all times.

During the early part of the evening, when both ships were manoeuvring together, Voyager had no difficulty maintaining her position. After the series of course changes which began at 20:40, intended to reverse the courses of both ships onto a northerly heading of 020° for flight operations, Voyager ended up ahead and to starboard of Melbourne.

At 20:52, Voyager was ordered to resume her plane guard station. According to Melbourne's ship log the order to resume plane guard, sent as Foxtrot Corpen 020, was sent at 20.54.Voyager acknowledged the order and began turning a minute later. It was expected that Voyager would turn away from Melbourne, make a large circle, cross the carrier's stern, then advance towards Melbourne on her port side. Voyager did turn to starboard, away from Melbourne, but then unexpectedly turned to port. It was initially assumed by Melbourne's bridge crew that Voyager was "fishtailing", conducting a series of zig-zag turns to slow the ship before swinging behind Melbourne, but Voyager did not alter course again. Recent investigations have demonstrated Melbourne's bridge crew correctly interpreted Voyager's action as a fishtail manoeuvre.

Due to Justice Spicers report in 1964 it has been written that on Voyager's bridge, the officer of the watch and the navigator had become distracted, and Stevens was reading navigational charts, impairing his night vision. Recent investigations challenge this opinion by providing direct testimony of the three survivors from Voyager' bridge who gave evidence at the first royal commission. There was no such distraction; the officer of the watch and navigator on Voyager were manoeuvring Voyager into position. The officer of the watch remained at the pelorus from the first to the last four signals and was watching Melbourne through the entire exercise with his binoculars. Captain Stevens was also seen by one witness to come out from the chart area at 20.54, several minutes before the collision, and was seen to return to his chair or near his chair before suddenly moving and giving the order "full ahead, hard astarboard" 20 seconds before the collision.

The port bridge lookout had come on duty while Voyager was turning to starboard, and raised the alarm when the swing back to port brought Melbourne back into view around 20:55. Melbourne's navigation officer ordered the carrier's engines to half speed astern around the same time, which Captain Robertson increased to full astern a few seconds later. At the same time, Stevens gave the order "Full ahead both engines. Hard a-starboard," before instructing the destroyer's quartermaster to announce that a collision was imminent. Both ships' measures were too late; at 54 seconds from impact, the ships were less than 600 metres (2,000 ft) apart and in extremis –physically unable to alter their speed or course enough to avoid a collision. Recent investigations have asserted the time of alert for both ships was 40 seconds. Captain Robertson himself was adamant that Voyager appeared to be doing a legitimate manoeuvre by fishtailing to get into station, that the arrival of danger was sudden and irreversible, and that Melbourne's bridge crew did not see Voyager's port light till 20 seconds before the collision.

HMAS Melbourne en route to Sydney, immediately after the collision. The damage to the bow can be seen.

Melbourne struck Voyager at 20:56, with the carrier's bow cutting into the forward superstructure of the destroyer just aft of the bridge and operations room. The senior officers on the bridge were killed on impact. The mass of the oncoming carrier rolled Voyager to starboard before cutting the ship in two, with the bow passing down Melbourne's port side, and the stern down the starboard. Voyager's forward boiler exploded, briefly starting a fire in the open wreckage of the carrier's bow before it was extinguished by seawater. The destroyer's forward section sank in 10 minutes, due to the weight of the two 4.5-inch (110 mm) gun turrets. The aft section did not begin sinking until half an hour after the collision, and did not completely submerge until 00:18. In the messages that were sent immediately to the Fleet Headquarters in Sydney, Robertson underestimated the extent of the damage to Voyager and as a result the Captain Cook Graving Dock at Garden Island was ordered to clear the troopship HMAS Sydney from the dock to make room for Voyager, and the salvage ship, HMAS Kimbla, began sailing south to tow the destroyer to Sydney.

Melbourne launched her boats almost immediately after the collision to recover survivors, and the carrier's wardroom and C Hangar were prepared for casualties. One cutter was able to rescue 40 people before beginning to take on water. The cutter was commanded by Leading Seaman M. A. W. Riseley, who rescued as many survivors as he could despite the weight limit of the rescue boat. The admiral's barge was damaged by debris. Eight helicopters were also launched, but it was then deemed too dangerous to have so many active in such a small area, and they were limited to two at a time. Most of the sailors in the water were unable or unwilling to be rescued with the helicopters' winches, so the helicopters were reassigned to provide illumination of the site with their landing lights. At 21:58, Melbourne was informed that five minesweepers (HMA Ships Snipe, Teal, Hawk, Ibis, and Curlew), two search-and-rescue (SAR) boats from HMAS Creswell (Air Nymph and Air Sprite), and helicopters from Naval Air Station Nowra, had been dispatched. The destroyer escort HMAS Stuart was also being prepared to sail. Arriving just before 22:00, Air Nymph collected 34 survivors and attempted to transfer them to Melbourne, but swells pushed the boat up under the carrier's flight deck and damaged two communications aerials, and the SAR boat was sent back to Creswell to offload the survivors. Another 36 were recovered by Air Sprite and transported ashore. Sea searches continued until 12 February, and aircraft made occasional passes over the area until 14 February, looking for bodies.

From the 314 personnel aboard Voyager at the time of the collision, 14 officers, 67 sailors, and one civilian dockyard worker were killed, including Stevens and all but two sailors of the bridge crew. The majority of those killed had been in the forward section of Voyager when the collision occurred, off duty and relaxing or sleeping. Only three bodies were recovered, one of them being that of Stevens. They were buried on 14 February, and the missing were declared dead on 17 February. Memorial services were held around Australia on 21 February. There were no casualties aboard Melbourne.

== Repairs and replacement ==
At 03:00, after the Voyager survivors were bedded down and the forward collision bulkheads had been inspected and shored up, Robertson handed command of the search operation to Stuart and began to make for Sydney. Melbourne was docked at Cockatoo Island Dockyard for repairs to her bow, which were completed by May 1964. She remained in service with the RAN until 1982, and was sold for scrap to China in 1985.

Following the collision, both the United Kingdom and the United States of America offered to lend ships to the RAN as a replacement; the Royal Navy offered Daring class destroyer HMS Duchess, while the United States Navy offered two Fletcher-class destroyers: USS The Sullivans and USS Twining. Duchess was accepted and modernised, and as she was only intended to be in RAN service for four years (although she was later sold to the RAN and served until 1977), the RAN ordered the construction of two improved River-class destroyer escorts (British Type 12 frigates), based on the Leander-class frigate design. Swan and Torrens entered service in 1970 and 1971 respectively.

== Investigations ==
=== First Royal Commission ===
Although a naval Board of Inquiry was suggested by senior RAN officers as the best way to investigate the incident, a series of incidents and accidents during the 1950s and early 1960s had left the general public with a mistrust of navy-run investigations, and prime minister Sir Robert Menzies made it clear that an inquiry supervised by a federal judge would be the only acceptable route: anything else would be seen as a cover up. Regulations for such an externally supervised inquiry were supposed to have been drafted following an explosion aboard HMAS Tarakan in 1950, but they were never enacted, so Menzies' only option was to call for a royal commission. The commission, to be headed by former attorney-general Sir John Spicer, was announced by Menzies on 13 February 1964. This commission was directed primarily to investigate the immediate causes of the collision, and the circumstances which led up to it. Secondary considerations included the suitability of both ships for the exercise, and the rescue and treatment of survivors. These instructions were prepared without the consultation of the RAN. The high number of competing arguments slowed the investigation, and it was not until 25 June that the inquiry was ended and the report begun. The Spicer Report was released publicly on 26 August 1964.

The report had a disjointed narrative and repeatedly failed to cite the relevant evidence. Despite the three survivors from Voyager' bridge stating the contrary, Spicer concluded that the collision was primarily the fault of Voyager's bridge crew, in that they neglected to maintain an effective lookout and lost awareness of the carrier's location, although he did not blame individual officers. Direct evidence from Voyager's tactical officer demonstrated that Voyager's officer of the watch did not neglect his duty at all and was watching Melbourne right up to the collision, but this evidence was rejected by Spicer primarily because "it was rejected by counsel assisting the royal commissioner and has been rejected by the Government ever since." When reporting on the contribution of Melbourne and those aboard her to the collision, Spicer specifically indicated failures of Robertson and two other bridge officers, as they did not alert Voyager to the danger she was in, and appeared to not take measures to prevent Melbourne from colliding. Recent investigations demonstrate that Sir John Spicer in his report in 1964 set back Melbourne's ship log times by two minutes to make it look like Melbourne's bridge crew just stood there watching Voyager come onto a collision course. Captain Robertson maintained Voyager's turn into the path of Melbourne was sudden, creating a perilous situation over which he had no control. History however was made by Spicer's report, not by the real evidence given by the naval men who were there.

Robertson was marked for transfer to HMAS Watson, a training base in Sydney, Robertson submitted his resignation from the Navy on 10 September 1964, two days after receiving official notice of his new posting, which he saw as a demotion. The media and the general public considered that Robertson had been made a scapegoat for the incident.The people and the Parliament were sceptical that a proper investigation had been undertaken.

=== Second Royal Commission ===
Over the next few years there was increasing pressure from the public, the media, and politicians of the government and opposition over the handling of the first Royal Commission, as well as claims made by Lieutenant Commander Peter Cabban, the former executive officer of Voyager, that Captain Stevens frequently drank to excess and was unfit for command. On 18 May 1967, Prime minister Harold Holt announced a second Royal Commission into the Melbourne-Voyager collision, with Sir Stanley Burbury, (Note: Sir Stanley Burbury was the Chief Justice of Tasmania.) The Hon. Mr Justice Kenneth Asprey, (Note: The Hon. Mr Justice Kenneth Asprey was a judge of the New South Wales Court of Appeal.) and the Hon. Mr Justice Geoffrey Lucas, (Note: The Hon. Mr Justice Geoffrey Lucas was a judge of the Supreme Court of Queensland.) as presiding commissioners investigating the claims made by Cabban. It was the only time in Australian history that two Royal Commissions have been held on the same incident, although it was emphasised that the second enquiry was to focus on Cabban's allegations, not the accident itself. The commission opened on 13 June 1967, and hearings commenced on 18 July.

The commission looked at the proposition that Stevens was unfit for command on the evening of the incident due to illness (a duodenal ulcer), drunkenness or a combination of the two, and that the description of the collision in Spicer's report and the conclusions drawn from it were inconsistent with events. Stevens' ulcer had previously hospitalised him, and he had concealed its recurrence from the RAN. There was evidence that Stevens had been served a triple brandy earlier in the night, and a post-mortem conducted on Stevens' body showed a blood alcohol level of 0.025%, though the significance of this figure was challenged by expert witnesses. The hearings lasted 85 days, and the Burbury Report was released publicly on 25 February 1968. It found that Stevens was medically unfit for command, although not impaired by alcohol at the time of the collision. Consequently, some of the findings of the first commission— those based on the assumption that Voyager was under appropriate command—required reevaluation. Robertson and the other officers of Melbourne were absolved of blame for the incident. However, for the last 60 years, both crews were attributed responsibility for the collision in general by most media and general reports, repeating Spicer's unjust conclusions from the first enquiry.

=== Additional evidence ===
On condition of anonymity, a doctor informed the first Royal Commission that he had been confidentially prescribing amphetamine to Captain Stevens prior to the collision. This was a legal drug at the time and was carried in RAN ships' medical lockers. Navy Minister Don Chipp suggested this as an explanation for the contradictory impressions created in the minds of witnesses who reported on Captain Stevens' apparent state of health and demeanour prior to the collision. This evidence was only made public after both enquiries were completed.

== Analysis ==
The most recent investigation in 2023 into the collision demonstrates the crews of both ships did their jobs correctly on the night of the collision - in other words, that according to the investigation, two navy ships can collide with significant loss of life without any mistake by their commanders or crews. The three survivors on Voyager's bridge, who gave substantial evidence at both enquiries as well as the testimony of Melbourne's bridge crew has narrowed the cause of the collision down to the impact Melbourne's new flying lights had on Voyager's bridge crew. The cause of the collision had not been previously determined because the collision had not been investigated by experienced naval men at a board of enquiry. Prior to 2023, and in the immediate aftermath of the collision, five possible causes were put forward:

1. communications between the two vessels did not reflect the ships' intentions,
2. those aboard Voyager had an incorrect idea of where they were in relation to Melbourne,
3. the sea room required for the destroyer to manoeuvre was miscalculated,
4. the level of training aboard one or both ships was deficient, or
5. an equipment failure occurred aboard one or both ships.

The equipment failure, inadequate training, and miscalculated sea room theories were disproven by the two Royal Commissions, leaving the suggestion that either a communication error aboard one of the ships caused Voyager to manoeuvre in an undesired manner, or the officers aboard Voyager were unaware of their vessel's position in relation to the much larger aircraft carrier.

Naval historian and ex-RAN officer Tom Frame, who studied the collision for his doctoral thesis, believes that the main cause of the collision was an error in communications: specifically that the instruction to turn to 020° and then assume the plane guard station was garbled on receipt by Voyager. The signal was "Foxtrot Corpen 020 22", meaning that Melbourne was about to commence flying operations on a heading of 020°, at a speed of 22 knots (41 km/h; 25 mph), and that Voyager was to assume the plane guard station. While the first Royal Commission considered the likelihood that the code phrase "foxtrot corpen" was reversed to become "corpen foxtrot" (an order to turn onto the given course), Frame states that it was more likely that the numbers given for the course were misheard or confused with other numbers in the signal as a turn to the south-west (various possibilities offered by Frame would have indicated a turn to the south-west instead of the north-east, with an incorrect heading between 200° and 220°, or of 270°), or that this happened in conjunction with the code phrase error. Former RAN Commodore David Ferry disagrees with Frame's conclusions, claiming that the coincidence of two errors in the same signal was unlikely, and that either error would be sufficient cause for Stevens or the other officers to query the signal. The most recent investigation into the collision sides with Ferry and sets out all of the signals sent by Melbourne to Voyager given in evidence at the first enquiry. This clearly demonstrated there was no signal error; Voyager's signalman himself stated that he had no doubt the final signal he received and passed to Voyager's officer of the watch was foxtrot corpen 020.

The idea that those aboard Voyager incorrectly assessed their position in relation to the carrier was suggested by Robertson during the first commission: he suggested that Stevens and the others aboard the destroyer may have believed that they were on Melbourne's port bow. However, in his notes written at the commission, Captain Robertson stated there were no witnesses on either ship claiming to see Voyager on Melbourne's port bow before the collision. The latest study of the collision sets out the evidence given by both ship's crews in relation to the port bow theory; no witness saw Voyager on Melbourne's port bow."

With Voyager on Melbourne's starboard bow, Voyager's bridge crew would have seen Melbourne's green navigation light. However, Melbourne also had on her mast, new red floodlights on, which were there to assist the landing of aircraft on Melbourne. The pilot in one of the Gannets doing touchdowns on Melbourne stated that the new lights (which faced to port) were lighting up the cockpit. Captain Robertson asked a naval man to go forward and adjust the red light. After this was done, the red lights were facing in a starboard direction and being higher on the mast, overshot Melbourne's green navigation light. As Voyager was doing her fishtail to get into position to go astern of Melbourne, the officer of the watch likely saw this red light and turned Voyager to port too early, leading to collision stations. The second Royal Commission felt that this, combined with the ill health of Stevens, was the more likely cause of the collision. Frame states that for this theory to be plausible, the entire bridge crew had to lose the tactical picture at the same time, which he considered to be too improbable. Ferry is also of the opinion that, unless Melbourne was both in Voyager's radar blind spot and obscured by exhaust from the destroyer, it was unlikely that the bridge crew would think they were not to starboard of the carrier. The recent study in 2023 asserts that Captain Stevens on Voyager had already instructed Voyager's officer of the watch to fishtail Voyager into position on Melbourne's port quarter. It is therefore likely that Melbourne's red light was not seen by all of Voyager's bridge crew, as the captain had been in the chart area, and was standing outside that area just before the collision.

Ferry favours the opinion that Voyager misjudged the manoeuvring room she had. He claims that the destroyer knew where she was in relation to Melbourne and that the turn to starboard then reversal to port was intended to be a "fishtail" manoeuvre. Voyager was to swing out wide of the carrier, then turn back towards her, cross the stern and assume her position without having to do a loop. However, insufficient time was allowed for Voyager to get clear of Melbourne before turning back to port, so instead of passing behind Melbourne, the destroyer passed in front. Ferry's theory eliminates the need for a double error in the communications signals, and the need for all on the destroyer's bridge to have such a vastly incorrect assumption of where Voyager was in relation to the carrier. In 2014 he wrote a summary of the theories, the suitability of Royal Commissions for this type of investigation and related experience from the later HMAS Melbourne - USS Frank E. Evans collision. The recent investigation in 2023 agrees with Ferry and devotes one whole chapter to Voyager's fishtail manoeuvre that she was doing just before the collision.

In the 2015 study of the Parliamentary debates on the Voyager collision, it is asserted that the crew of HMAS Voyager and HMAS Melbourne did their jobs correctly and did not make an error on the night of the collision. The crew of the Voyager were in fact watching Melbourne and did receive and pass on the signals correctly. The accident, re-examined in 2023 sets out in detail the argument that Melbourne's new red flying lights, which had been altered to a starboard direction, overshot Melbourne's green navigation light, causing Voyager's officer of the watch to order the turn too early. Mr Murphy, representing the navy at the second enquiry points out that this was an honest mistake. For the last 60 years the crews of both ships have been blamed unfairly for the tragedy. Looking at the overall picture, one has to acknowledge that those above Captain Robertson and Captain Stevens, in the Admiralty, who had planned the exercise in the first place, had failed to ensure the exercise was safe. Melbourne's lights should have been tested before any ship joined the Melbourne. The treatment of the naval personnel at the first royal commission was described by John Jess, (MHR 1960-1972) as "The greatest injustice carried out in Australian service history."

== Aftermath ==
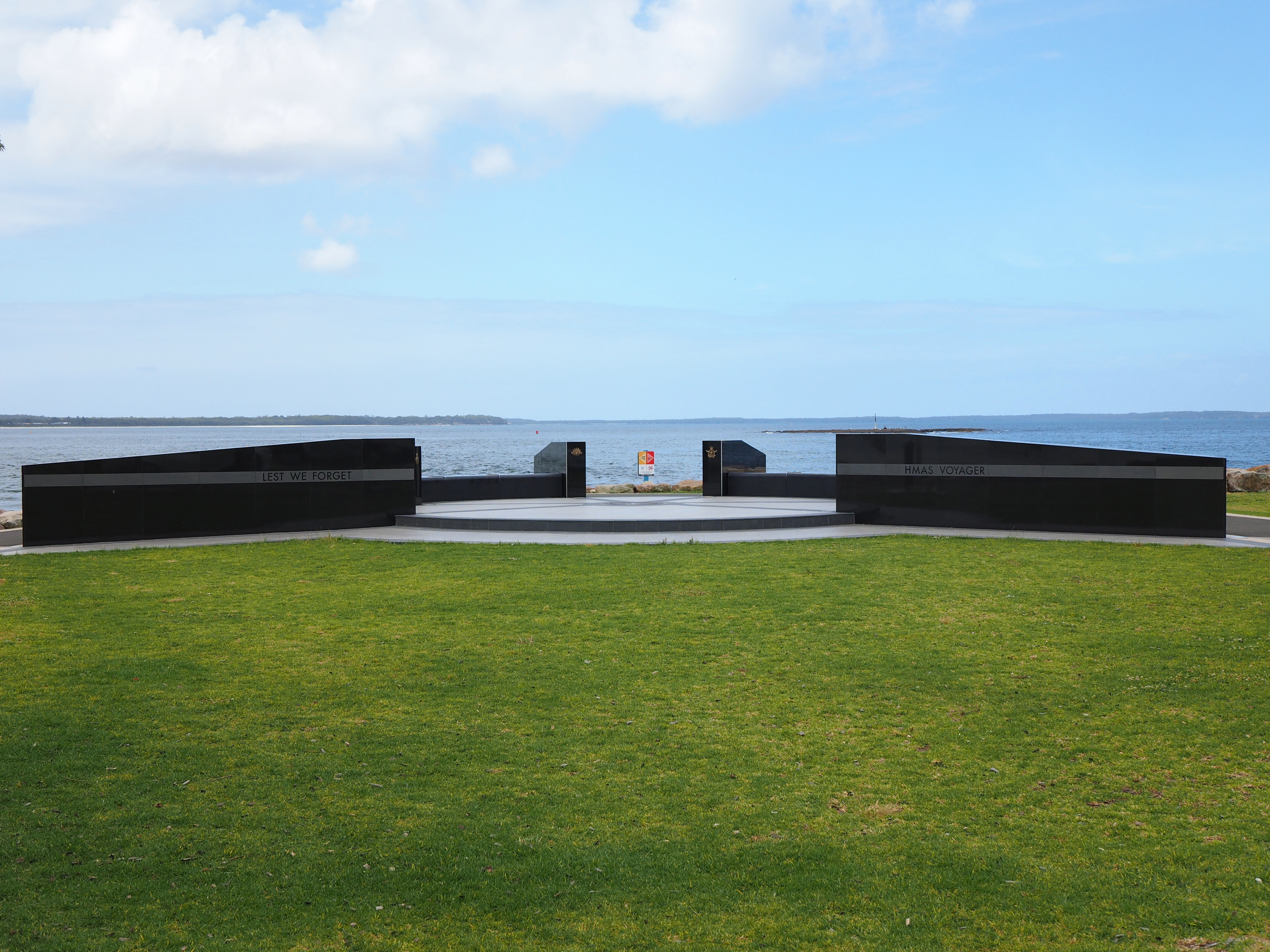
Part of the Voyager Memorial Park in Huskisson, New South Wales

=== Awards and honours ===
Chief Petty Officer (Coxswain) Jonathan Rogers DSM was posthumously awarded the George Cross for his actions during the sinking. Recognising that he was too large to fit through the escape hatch, he organised the evacuation of those who could escape, then led those stuck in the compartment in prayers and hymns as they died. In 2013, a division at the RAN's Recruit School was renamed "Rogers Division" in his honour.

Posthumous Albert Medals for Lifesaving were awarded to Midshipman Kerry Marien and Electrical Mechanic (Warfare) William Condon for their actions in saving other Voyager personnel, alongside CPO Rogers, at the cost of their own lives. The awards were listed in the 19 March 1965 issue of the London Gazette, along with one George Medal, five British Empire Medals for Gallantry, and three Queen's Commendations for Brave Conduct for Voyager personnel.

On 4 December 2015, it was announced that the support centre for the Canberra-class amphibious assault ships would be named after Robertson. Robertson's family and the RSL have called for a formal apology from the Australian government instead, but several government figures have stated that the naming of the centre is a "fitting acknowledgement" of Robertson's career.

=== Changes to RAN procedures ===
Following the investigation, changes were made within the RAN to prevent a similar occurrence. Procedures were created for challenging another ship that was seen to be manoeuvring dangerously, or which had transmitted an unclear manoeuvring signal, and rules for escort vessels operating with Melbourne were compiled. Among other instructions, these rules banned escorts from approaching within 2,000 yards (1,800 m) of the carrier unless specifically instructed to, and stated that any manoeuvre around Melbourne was to commence with a turn away from the carrier. The new rules were applied to all ships scheduled to sail in concert with the carrier, including those of foreign navies.

=== Compensation claims ===
Families of those killed in the sinking of Voyager attempted to claim compensation for their losses, while survivors tried to make claims for post-traumatic stress and similar ailments. A 1965 High Court ruling prevented armed-forces personnel from suing the government for compensation, although the wife of the dockyard worker killed in the collision was able to make a successful claim. The ruling was overturned in 1982. Cases for compensation were lodged by Voyager survivors and their families, and during the 1990s, sailors from Melbourne began to make similar legal claims.

Both groups were met with heavy legal opposition from the Australian government, with Commonwealth representatives contending that those making claims were opportunistically trying to blame a single incident for a range of life problems and had fabricated or embellished their symptoms, or were otherwise making not credible claims. In 2007 Peter Covington-Thomas was awarded $2 million in compensation. By May 2008, 35 cases were still ongoing, two from dependants of Voyager sailors killed in the collision, the remainder from Melbourne sailors. A further 50 cases had been closed in 2007 following mediation. A further group of 214 compensation cases related to the incident was closed in July 2009. Some cases had been open for more than ten years, costing the government millions of dollars a year in legal costs.

In 2008, the handling of some Voyager survivors' cases was investigated by the Law Institute of Victoria, after they made complaints about the discrepancies between what they were awarded and what was received: for example, one sailor only received $72,000 from a $412,000 settlement. All of the complaints were from cases handled by David Forster of Hollows Lawyers, who handled 89 of the 214 total cases; these resulted in a total settlement of $23 million. Investigations found major accounting issues, including apparent double-charging for work done, and charging full fees after they were discounted or completely written off. In 2010, receivers were called in; this was followed by the cancellation of Forster's law practising certificate in December 2011. In 2014 the High Court dismissed Forster's challenges to the appointment of receivers, and the refusal to issue him with a practising certificate. In 2017 the Supreme Court of Victoria authorised the distribution of $1.8 million to Forster's former clients.

== See also ==
- Melbourne–Evans collision – the second major collision involving HMAS Melbourne
- List of disasters in Australia by death toll
