= Jonathan Rogers (GC) =

Welsh-born Australian sailor

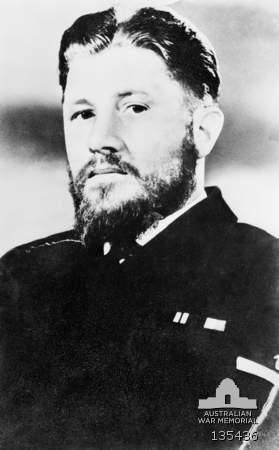
- Born: 16 September 1920; Froncysyllte, Wales
- Died: 10 February 1964 (aged 43); Off the coast of New South Wales
- Burial place: at sea, Jervis Bay
- Military career
- Allegiance: United Kingdom; Australia
- Branch: Royal Navy; Royal Australian Navy
- Service years: 1938–46; 1950–64
- Rank: Chief Petty Officer
- Nickname: "Buck"
- Conflicts: Second World War; Battle of the Atlantic; European Theatre; Korean War
- Awards: George Cross; Distinguished Service Medal

Jonathan Rogers, GC, DSM (16 September 1920 – 10 February 1964) was a Welsh-born sailor and an Australian recipient of the George Cross, awarded for the heroism he displayed on the night of 10 February 1964 during the sinking of HMAS Voyager.

== Early life ==
Jonathan Rogers was born in Froncysyllte, near Llangollen, Wales on 16 September 1920. The fifth of seven children, he undertook schooling in Acrefair, before leaving at 14 to work at a local brickyard. He was a keen boxer and football player, before joining the Royal Navy (RN) at the age of 18 in 1938.

== Royal Navy service ==
Serving largely on coastal patrol vessels throughout World War 2, Rogers was awarded the Distinguished Service Medal for the "coolness and leadership" he showed while serving as coxswain of Motor Torpedo Boat 698 in action off the coast of Dunkirk in May 1944.

Discharging from the RN in January 1946, Rogers lived in Pen-y-cae, with his wife and four children, working at a local colliery and built houses, until he applied to join the Royal Australian Navy (RAN) in 1950.

== Royal Australian Navy service ==
Rogers was accepted into the RAN on 6 July 1950, being posted to the aircraft carrier HMAS Sydney. He would serve on multiple RAN vessels including Burdekin, Junee, Anzac, Warramunga, Barcoo and Tobruk. His posting to Tobruk coincided with the vessels deployment to Korea during the Korean War. In 1956 he was promoted to Chief Petty Officer.

After a shore posting at Rushcutter in Sydney, Rogers would be posted to the destroyer Voyager in January 1963 as the ships coxswain. The coxswain was the senior sailor on the vessel, and responsible for discipline and good order of the ship.

== George Cross ==
On 10 February 1964, HMAS Voyager was taking part in exercises with the aircraft carrier HMAS Melbourne off the coast of Jervis Bay, when the two vessels collided, leading to Voyager being sliced in half by the much larger Melbourne.

Rogers was operating a tombola game being played by over 60 men in the forward mess of the ship at the time of the collision. After the collision, the now separate forward half of the ship began to fill with water and heel over. Quickly taking command of the situation, he stopped the growing panic in the mess and began attempting to control the flooding. After trying to free a stuck escape hatch, he managed to orchestrate an escape into other compartments with working exits. Realising that he was too large to escape himself, he selflessly worked on getting the younger sailors out.

Rogers then began to lead the remaining sailors in prayer and hymn, encouraging them "...to meet death alongside himself with dignity and honour”. His wife would later state "It was typical of him, he never thought of himself". He would become one of the 82 men who would die in the sinking.

On 19 March 1965, Rogers would be posthumously awarded the George Cross, with his citation stating.

St. James's Palace, 19th of March 1965. The Queen has been graciously pleased, on the advice of Her Majesty’s Australian Ministers, to approve the award of the George Cross to: Chief Petty Officer Jonathan Rogers, D.S.M., R. 40859 (Deceased). In recognition of his outstanding gallantry and devotion to duty in saving life at sea when H.M.A.S. Voyager was sunk after collision on 10th February 1964, for maintaining the morale of junior ratings in great adversity, for organising the escape of as many as possible, and for supporting the spirits of those who could not escape and encouraging them to meet death alongside himself with dignity and honour. He upheld the highest traditions of service at sea and of his rating of Chief Petty Officer (Coxswain)

== Personal life and legacy ==
Rogers was married in 1942, and had three daughters and one son.

In 2013, during the renaming of initial entry sailor divisions at the RAN recruit school. "Moran Division" was renamed "Rogers Division".

== Honours and awards ==
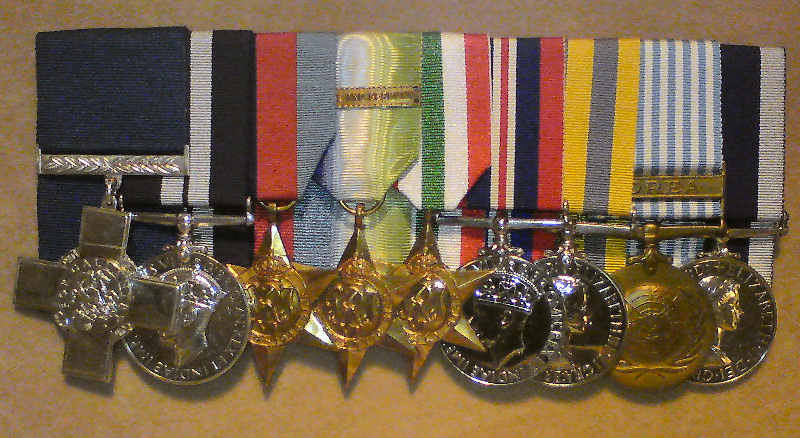
Medal Group for Jonathan Rogers as displayed in Australian War Memorial

Ribbon	Description	Notes
Ribbon for George Cross	George Cross (GC)	gazetted 1965
Ribbon for the DSM	Distinguished Service Medal (DSM)	gazetted 1944
Ribbon for the 1939–1945 Star	1939–1945 Star	
ribbon for the 1914–15 Star	Atlantic Star	with FRANCE AND GERMANY clasp
Ribbon for the BWM	Italy Star	
Ribbon for the War Medal 1939–1945	War Medal 1939–1945	
Ribbon for the Australian Active Service Medal 1945–1975	Australian Active Service Medal 1945–1975	23 January 2014
Ribbon for the Korea Medal	Korea Medal	
Ribbon for the United Nations Korea Medal	United Nations Korea Medal	
Ribbon for the Naval General Service Medal	Naval General Service Medal	23 January 2014
Ribbon for the Australian Service Medal 1945–1975	Australian Service Medal 1945–1975	23 January 2014
Ribbon for the Australian General Service Medal Korea	Australian General Service Medal Korea	23 January 2014
Ribbon for the Australian Defence Medal	Australian Defence Medal	23 January 2014
Ribbon for the Naval Long Service and Good Conduct Medal	Naval Long Service and Good Conduct Medal	
Ribbon for the Pingat Jasa Malaysia	Pingat Jasa Malaysia	(Malaysia) 23 January 2014
