= Duncan Stevens =

Australian naval officer

- Born: 23 March 1921; Fairfield, Victoria
- Died: 10 February 1964 (aged 42); Off the coast of Jervis Bay
- Relatives: Major General Sir Jack Stevens (father)
- Military career
- Allegiance: Australia
- Branch: Royal Australian Navy
- Service years: 1935–1964
- Rank: Captain
- Commands: HMAS Voyager (1963–64); HMAS Quickmatch (1955–56); HMAS Cowra (1951–52); HMAS Reserve (1950–51); HMAS Koala (1949–50); HMAS Kangaroo (1948–49)
- Conflicts: Second World War

Captain Duncan Herbert Stevens (23 March 1921 – 10 February 1964) was a Royal Australian Navy officer, best remembered for being in command of HMAS Voyager when she collided with HMAS Melbourne in 1964, leading to his death. After former Voyager executive officer Peter Cabban alleged that Stevens had been unfit for command, a royal commission was convened in 1967: it found that Stevens was unfit to command for medical reasons, though it only sustained some of Cabban's allegations.
