= Frank Evans (guitarist) =

- Born: 1 October 1930
- Died: 6 February 2007 (aged 76) Bristol, United Kingdom
- Genre: Jazz
- Occupations: Guitarist, composer
- Instrument: Guitar
- Labels: Blue Bag, 77 Records, Saydisc

Frank Evans (1 October 1930 – 6 February 2007) was an English jazz guitarist

== Career ==
Evans started playing guitar at the age of eleven. His first recording was with Tubby Hayes and Tony Coe on Jazz Tête à Tête in 1966. After years of touring, Evans focused on his career as a solo jazz guitarist and operated from his home town of Bristol. In the late 1970s, he started Blue Bag Records, releasing his albums Noctuary, Soiree, and ...For Little Girls. In February 1978, he was featured on the cover of Guitar: The Magazine for All Guitarists.

He performed on television and radio, including the BBC One show Parkinson and an ITV show called Frank Evans and Friends. As a composer and arranger, he worked on soundtracks for television drama and documentary programs.

== Discography ==
- Mark Twain (1970)
- Stretching Forth (1971)
- In an English Manner (1972)
- Noctuary 1976)
- Soiree (1977)
- ...For Little Girls

With Tubby Hayes

- Jazz Tête à Tête (1966)
