= HMAS Voyager (D04) =

1957-1964 Daring-class destroyer of the Royal Australian Navy

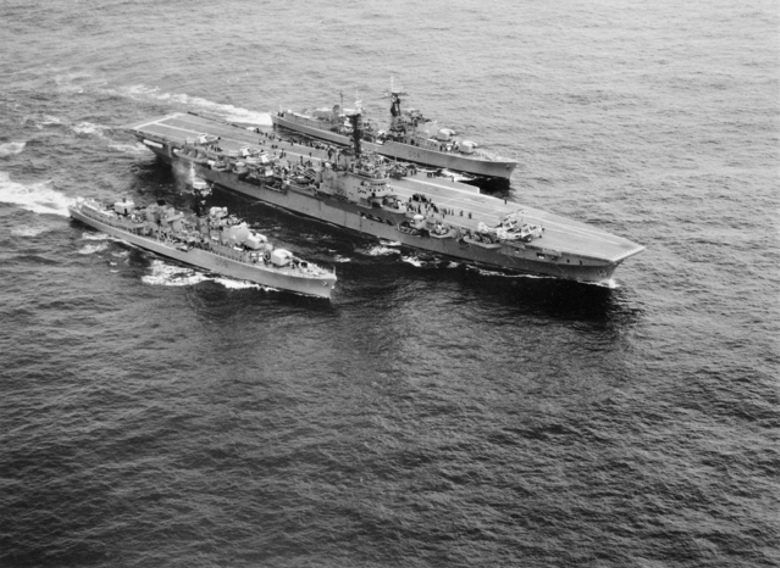
- HMAS Voyager (right) alongside HMAS Melbourne (center) and HMAS Vendetta (left) in 1959

History

Australia
- Builder: Cockatoo Docks and Engineering Company
- Laid down: 10 October 1949
- Launched: 1 May 1952
- Commissioned: 12 February 1957
- Motto: "Quo Fata Vocant" (Where Fate Calls)
- Honours and awards: Seven inherited battle honours
- Fate: Sank following collision on 10 February 1964
- Badge

General characteristics
- Class & type: Daring-class destroyer
- Displacement: 2,800 tons standard; 3,600 tons (full load)
- Length: 390 ft (120 m)
- Beam: 43 ft (13 m)
- Draught: 12 ft 9 in (3.89 m)
- Propulsion: 2 × Foster Wheeler boilers, 2 × English Electric geared steam turbines, two shafts, 54,000 hp
- Speed: 33 knots (61 km/h; 38 mph)
- Range: 3,700 nmi (6,900 km; 4,300 mi) at 20 knots (37 km/h; 23 mph)
- Complement: 20 officers, 300 sailors
- Armament: 6 × QF 4.5-inch (113 mm) Mark V guns in three double turrets; 6 × Bofors 40 mm guns in three twin mounts; 2 × 5-tube 21-inch (530 mm) torpedo launchers; 1 × Limbo anti-submarine mortar
- Notes: Taken from:

HMAS Voyager was a Daring-class destroyer of the Royal Australian Navy (RAN), that was lost in a collision in 1964.

Constructed between 1949 and 1957, Voyager was the first ship of her class to enter Australian service, and the first all-welded ship to be built in Australia. During her career, Voyager was deployed to the Far East Strategic Reserve on six occasions, but never fired a shot in anger.

During the night of 10 February 1964, Voyager and the aircraft carrier HMAS Melbourne collided off Jervis Bay, when the destroyer passed in front of the carrier during post-refit sea trials. Voyager was cut in two by the collision, sinking with the loss of 82 of the 314 people aboard. This was the largest loss of Australian military personnel in peacetime, and the subsequent investigations resulted in the holding of two Royal Commissions—the only time in Australian history this has occurred.

== Design and construction ==
The Royal Australian Navy (RAN) initially ordered four Daring-class destroyers, which were to be named after the ships of the "Scrap Iron Flotilla" of World War II. The ships were modified during construction: most changes were made to improve habitability, including the installation of air-conditioning.

Voyager was laid down by the Cockatoo Docks and Engineering Company at Sydney, New South Wales on 10 October 1949. She was launched on 1 May 1952 by Dame Pattie Menzies, wife of the prime minister. Voyager was commissioned on 12 February 1957—she was the first ship of the RAN commissioned as 'Her' Majesty's Australian Ship. She was the first all-welded ship to be constructed in Australia. During construction the cost of Voyager nearly tripled to AU£7 million.

Voyager was armed with six 4.5-inch (114 mm) Mark V guns in three double turrets ("A" and "B" turret before the bridge, "X" turret on the aft superstructure), six Bofors 40 mm guns in three twin mounts (one each side on the forward superstructure, the third on the aft superstructure behind the rear funnel), two 5-tube 21-inch (533 mm) Petand torpedo launchers (located between the forward and aft superstructure), and one Limbo anti-submarine mortar (located near the stern). Voyager's armament differed from the other two Australian Darings, Vendetta and Vampire: the latter ships were equipped with two single Bofors on the forward superstructure, and two twin Bofors on the aft superstructure.

== Operational history ==
=== 1957–1959 ===
As Voyager was the first ship of her class in Australian service, she underwent an extensive program of sea trials after commissioning, which lasted until September. During the late stages of the trials, Voyager was damaged in a heavy storm, and on her return to Sydney, she was docked for repairs and maintenance until early January 1958. After re-entering service, Voyager and HMAS Warramunga were assigned on 13 January to the Far East Strategic Reserve (FESR). Voyager returned on 1 September 1958, and entered a refit and leave period two days later, which lasted until 27 January 1959.

Following the refit, the destroyer was involved in a "Shop Window" exercise on 20 February—a day-long fleet exercise used to demonstrate RAN capabilities to politicians and media. On 3 March, the ship was assigned again to the FESR, and sailed for Singapore via South and Western Australia. While still off the northern coast of Western Australia, Voyager was involved in a South East Asia Treaty Organisation (SEATO) joint naval exercise. On 30 April, burst tubes in the "B" boiler damaged the ship, forcing her to limp to Hong Kong for six weeks of repairs. Over 300 sections of tubing had to be replaced in both boilers, with the cause of the damage confirmed to be oil contamination of the boilers' feed water. After repairs were completed on 15 June, Voyager sailed to Australia and underwent refit in Victoria.

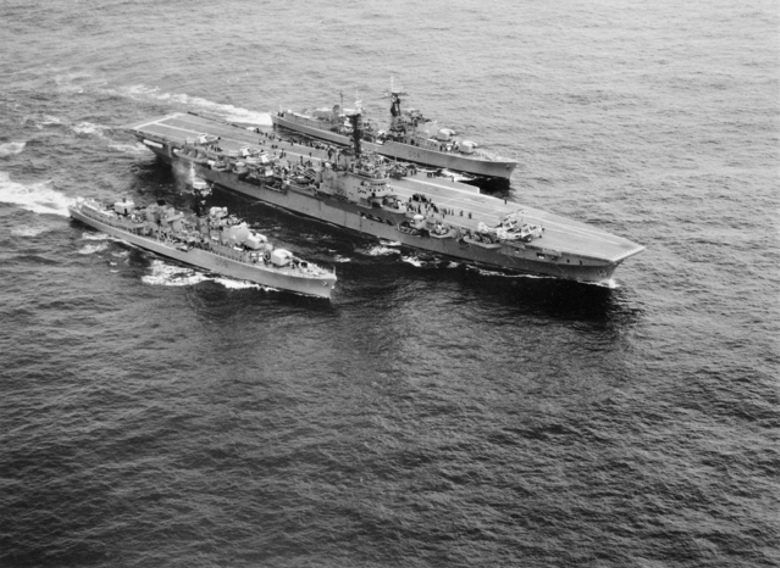
Voyager underway with sister ship HMAS Vendetta and the aircraft carrier HMAS Melbourne in 1959

In late 1959, Voyager was sent to the Far East for a two-and-a-half-month deployment. On 20 October, Voyager and her two sister ships operated together for the first time, and were officially designated the 9th Destroyer Squadron. A few days later, the Squadron was assigned to escort the aircraft carrier HMAS Melbourne during a cruise to New Zealand, with the ships returning to Sydney on 4 December; Voyager immediately entering a maintenance and leave period.

=== 1960–1962 ===
Voyager's operations in 1960 began with a promotional visit to Port Kembla, New South Wales in late January, before participating in exercises with ships of the RAN and Royal New Zealand Navy (RNZN). On 28 March, Voyager and the carrier Melbourne departed for the FESR. En route, water tubes in "B" boiler burst again, although the damage was less severe than in the previous year. The destroyer was made to collect replacements in Singapore before sailing to Hong Kong to have them installed before the start of SEATO exercise Sea Lion in May. Voyager returned to Sydney via the west and south coasts of Australia in late June, and immediately entered a refit, which included restructuring of her bridge area. The refit was concluded on 14 November, and after working-up exercises and a short period of Christmas leave for the ships' company, departed on 28 December with HMAS Quickmatch for another FESR deployment.

Upon arriving in Singapore on 11 January 1961, Voyager and Quickmatch were assigned as escorts for the British aircraft carrier HMS Hermes. The three ships were meant to sail to Subic Bay for joint exercises with the United States Navy, but these were cancelled while en route. Voyager and Quickmatch were ordered to Bangkok for a goodwill visit at the end of January, with the two ships performing a Shop Window exercise for Royal Thai Navy officers. After rejoining the FESR, Voyager was deployed to the Indian Ocean for SEATO Exercise Jet 61, which involved 25 ships from several Commonwealth navies. After participating in several other exercises, Voyager returned to Australia, escorting the carrier Melbourne as far as Townsville, Queensland before sailing to Jervis Bay and rendezvousing with nine RAN ships, two RN submarines, and three small military watercraft for a ceremonial entry to Sydney Harbour on 15 June. On 19 June, the ship commenced a refit which lasted until 1 November. On completion, Voyager was involved in a training exercise with other RAN, RN, and RNZN ships, and visited New Zealand before returning to Sydney on 8 December for Christmas leave.

Voyager left dock on 11 January 1962, before joining the carrier Melbourne and the frigate Queenborough for a deployment to the FESR. During this deployment, Voyager participated in several SEATO exercises, became the first RAN ship to visit Tacloban City in the Philippines, made multiple port visits to Japan, and cast a wreath in Lingayen Gulf to remember those killed by kamikaze attacks aboard the World War II heavy cruiser HMAS Australia. Voyager arrived back in Sydney on 21 June. The destroyer underwent refits until early October, participated in SEATO Exercise Seascape later that month, visited Fremantle for the 1962 Commonwealth Games in November, and returned to Sydney for maintenance in December.

=== 1963–1964 ===
Voyager started 1963 with work-up exercises in Jervis Bay, before departing on her sixth visit to the FESR on 31 January, in the company of sister ship Vampire. The Australian ships participated in SEATO Exercise Sea Serpent in late April and early May. The two Darings returned to Sydney on 3 August. Voyager then sailed to Williamstown Naval Dockyard in Victoria for a major refit, which lasted from 12 August to 31 December. The destroyer returned to Sydney on 25 January 1964, then proceeded to Jervis Bay on 7 February.

== Collision and loss ==
On 10 February 1964, Voyager was performing trials off Jervis Bay, under the command of Captain Duncan Stevens, following the Williamstown refit. The aircraft carrier HMAS Melbourne, under the command of Captain John Robertson, was also undergoing post-refit trials off Jervis Bay. The trials involved interactions between both ships, with Melbourne performed night flying exercises that evening, Voyager acted as the carrier's plane guard escort. This required Voyager to maintain a position 20° off Melbourne's port quarter at a distance from the carrier of 1,500 to 2,000 yards (1,400 to 1,800 m).

During the early part of the evening, Voyager had no difficulties maintaining her position during the manoeuvres. Following a series of turns intended to reverse the courses of both ships beginning at 8:40 pm, Voyager ended up to starboard of Melbourne. At 8:52 pm, Voyager was ordered to resume the plane guard station. The procedure to accomplish this required Voyager to turn away from Melbourne in a large circle, cross the carrier's stern, then take position off Melbourne's port side. Instead, Voyager first turned to starboard, away from Melbourne, then turned to port without warning. It was initially assumed by Melbourne's bridge crew that Voyager was conducting a series of tight turns to lose speed before swinging behind Melbourne, but Voyager did not alter course again.

At 8:55 pm, with Voyager still turning to port, Melbourne's navigator ordered the carrier's engines to half astern speed, with Robertson ordering an increase to full astern a few seconds later. At the same time, Stevens, returning to Voyager's bridge from the nearby chart table, gave the order "Full ahead both engines. Hard a-starboard.", before instructing the destroyer's Quartermaster to announce that a collision was imminent. Both ships' measures were too late to avoid a collision; Melbourne hit Voyager at 8:56 pm.

Melbourne struck just aft of Voyager's bridge structure, rolling the destroyer to starboard before cutting her in half. Voyager's forward boiler exploded, briefly setting fire to the bow of the carrier before it was extinguished by seawater. The destroyer's forward section sank quickly, due to the weight of the two 4.5-inch (110 mm) gun turrets. The aft section did not begin sinking until half an hour after the collision, and did not completely submerge until just after midnight. Messages were sent to the Fleet Headquarters in Sydney immediately after the collision, although staff in Sydney initially underestimated the extent of the damage to Voyager. Melbourne launched her boats almost immediately after the collision to recover survivors, and the carrier's wardroom and C Hangar were prepared for casualties. At 9:58 pm, Melbourne was informed that search-and-rescue boats from HMAS Creswell, helicopters from HMAS Albatross (Naval Air Station Nowra), and five Ton-class minesweepers had been despatched to assist in the search.

Of the 314 personnel aboard Voyager at the time of the collision, 14 officers and 67 sailors were killed, including Stevens and all but two of the bridge crew. A civilian dockyard worker also lost his life. The wreck of the destroyer lies in 600 fathoms (1,100 m) of water, 20 nautical miles (37 km) from Point Perpendicular on a bearing of 120°.

=== Investigation ===
A Royal Commission into the events of the collision was held in 1964, and found that while Voyager was primarily at fault for neglecting to maintain an effective lookout and awareness of the larger ship's location, Melbourne's bridge crew was also at fault for failing to alert Voyager and not taking measures to avoid the collision. The Royal Commission and its aftermath were poorly handled, and following pressure from the public, media and politicians, combined with revelations by Voyager's former executive officer that Stevens may have been unfit for command, a second Royal Commission was opened in 1967. This is the only time in Australian history that two Royal Commissions have been held for a single incident. The second commission found that Stevens was medically unfit for command, and that some of the findings of the first Royal Commission were therefore based on incorrect assumptions.

=== Honours and memorials ===
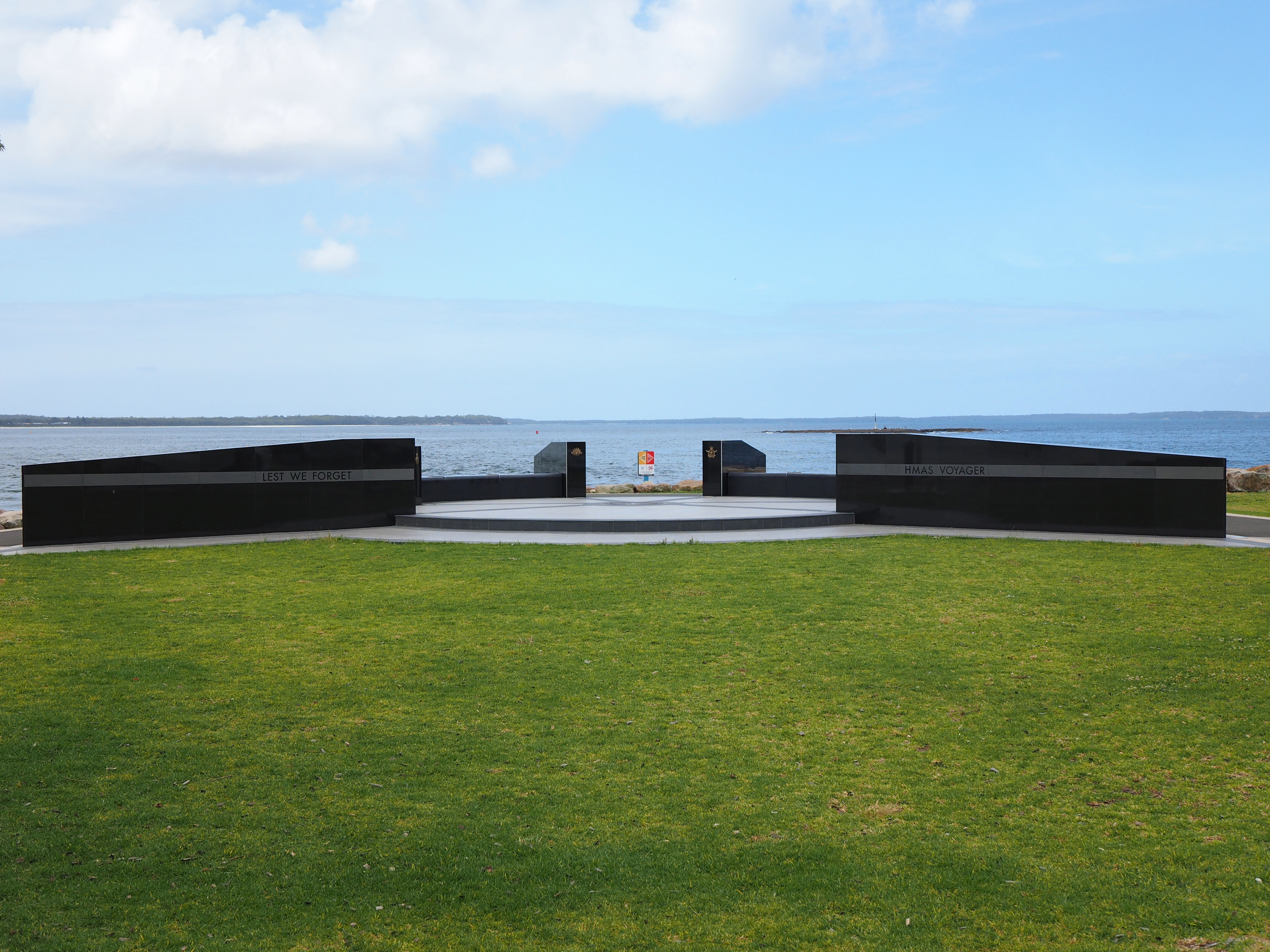
Part of the Voyager Memorial Park in Huskisson, New South Wales

Chief Petty Officer Jonathan Rogers was posthumously awarded the George Cross for his actions during the sinking. Recognising that he was too large to fit through the escape hatch, he organised the evacuation of those who could escape, then led those stuck in the compartment in prayers and hymns as they died.

Posthumous Albert Medals for Lifesaving were awarded to Midshipman Kerry Marien and Electrical Mechanic William Condon for their actions in saving other Voyager personnel at the cost of their own lives. The awards were listed in the 19 March 1965 issue of the London Gazette, along with one George Medal, five British Empire Medals for Gallantry, and three Queen's Commendations for Brave Conduct for Voyager personnel.

Memorial parks were established at Huskisson, New South Wales and East Hills, New South Wales. The latter park became part of the suburb of Voyager Point, New South Wales, which was originally an estate in East Hills accommodating the spouses and children of RAN personnel. Memorials were also erected at the RAN training establishment HMAS Cerberus and the Devonport Maritime Museum. A memorial plaque is dedicated to the Tasmanian officers and men lost with HMAS Voyager at the Tasmanian Seafarers' Memorial at Triabunna on the east coast of Tasmania, approximately 80 kilometres (50 mi) north-east of Hobart.

== See also ==
- List of disasters in Australia by death toll
- Melbourne-Evans collision
- USS Leyte Gulf, a US Navy cruiser involved in a similar collision
