= Frank Evans (general) =

US Marine Corps general (1876–1941)

Frank Edgar Evans
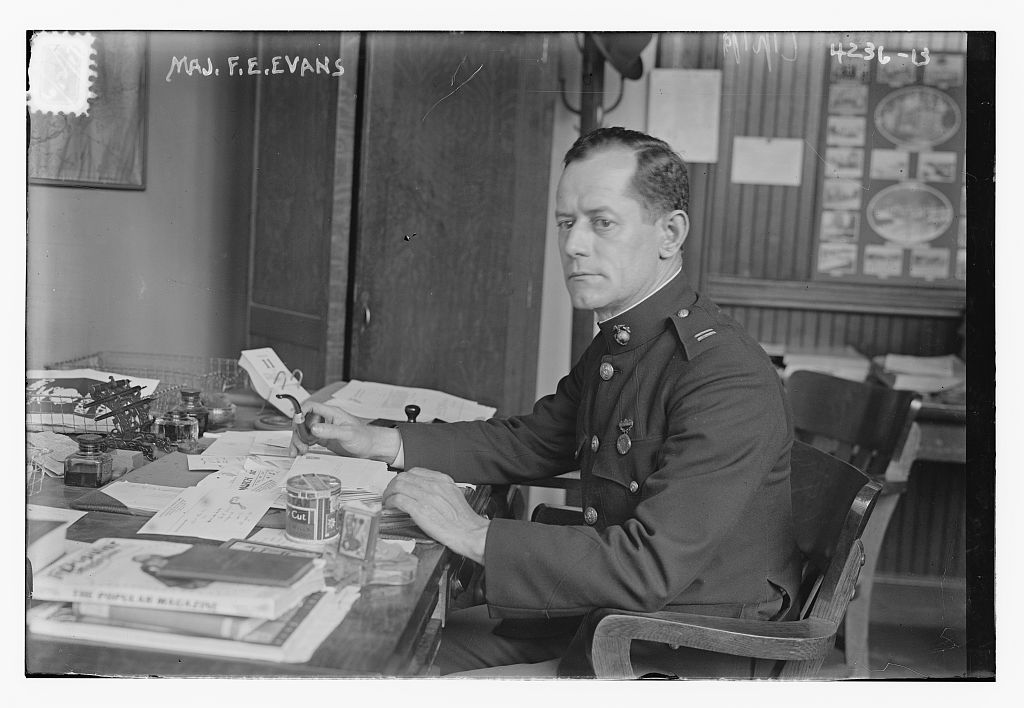
- Evans in 1917
- Born: November 19, 1876; Franklin, Pennsylvania, U.S.
- Died: November 25, 1941 (aged 65); Honolulu, Hawaii, U.S.
- Military career
- Allegiance: United States
- Branch: United States Marine Corps
- Service years: 1900–1940
- Rank: Brigadier general
- Conflicts: Spanish–American War; World War I
- Awards: Navy Cross; Silver Star

Frank Edgar Evans (19 November 1876 – 25 November 1941) served as an infantryman in the Spanish–American War, and was commissioned in the United States Marine Corps on 15 February 1900.

== Biography ==
He was born in Franklin, Pennsylvania on 19 November 1876. He served in the Philippines and in the United States prior to World War I, during which he won the Navy Cross and the Silver Star for his service in the Marine Brigade of the American Expeditionary Force in France. His postwar service included duty in Haiti, where from 1927 to 1930 he commanded the Constabulary Detachment and was Chief of the Gendarmerle d'Haiti. Brigadier General Evans also was District Marine Officer of several Naval Districts. Retired 1 December 1940, he made his home in Honolulu, Hawaii, where he died 25 November 1941.

== Legacy ==
The destroyer USS Frank E. Evans (DD-754) was named in his honor.
