= USS Frank E. Evans =

Allen M. Sumner–class destroyer

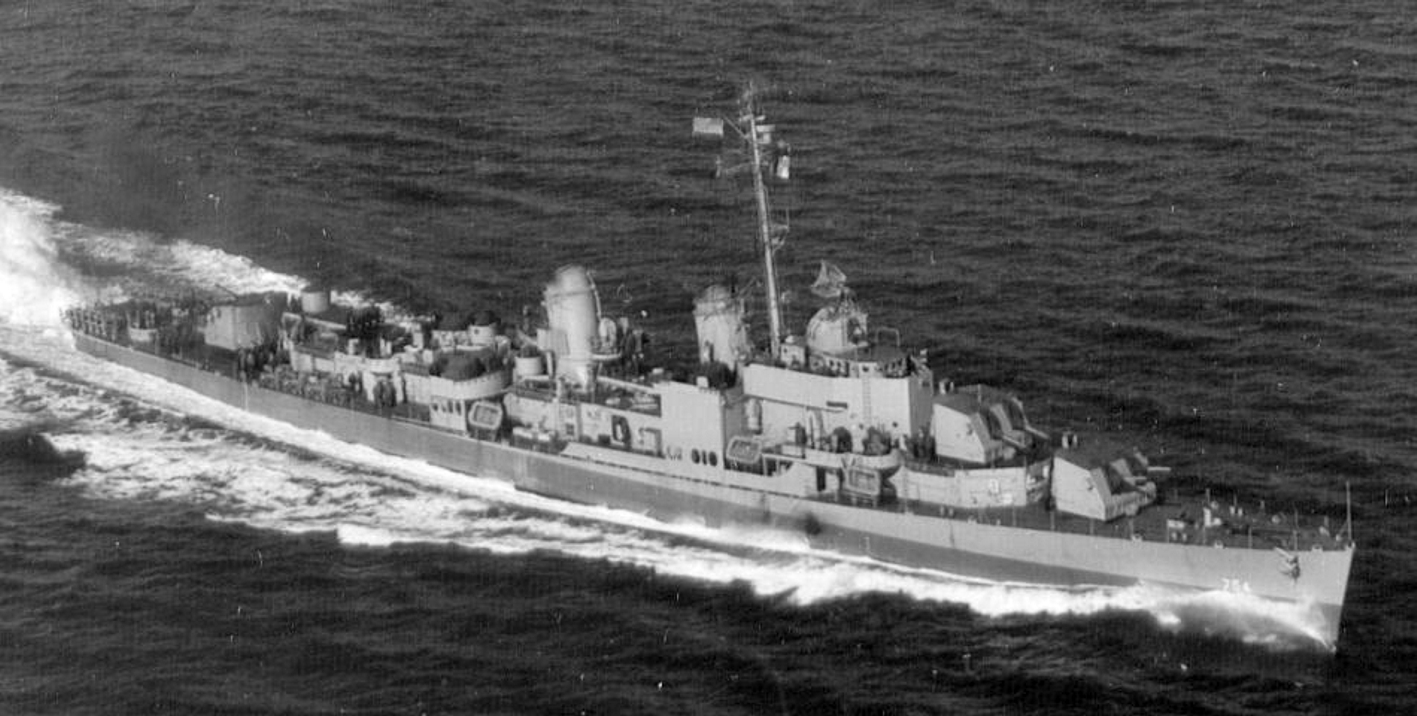
- USS Frank E. Evans, 1945

History

United States
- Name: USS Frank E. Evans
- Namesake: Brigadier General Frank Evans
- Builder: Bethlehem Mariners Harbor, Staten Island, New York
- Laid down: 21 April 1944
- Launched: 3 October 1944
- Commissioned: 3 February 1945
- Decommissioned: 14 December 1949
- Recommissioned: 15 September 1950
- Decommissioned: 1 July 1969
- Stricken: 1 July 1969
- Nickname(s): "Gray Ghost"; "The Fighter"; "Lucky Evans"
- Honors and awards: 1 battle star (World War II); 5 battle stars (Korean War)
- Fate: Bow sunk in collision 3 June 1969 8°59.2′N 110°47.7′E; Stern sunk as target 10 October 1969

General characteristics
- Class & type: Allen M. Sumner-class destroyer
- Displacement: 2,200 tons standard, 3,218 tons full load
- Length: 376.5 ft (114.8 m)
- Beam: 41.1 ft (12.5 m)
- Draft: 14.2 ft (4.3 m) mean; 15.7 ft (4.8 m) maximum
- Propulsion: 60,000 hp (45,000 kW); General Electric geared turbines; two screws
- Speed: 36.5 kn (67.6 km/h; 42.0 mph)
- Range: 3,300 mi (5,300 km) at 20 kn (37 km/h; 23 mph)
- Complement: 336
- Armament: 6 × 5 in (130 mm)/ 38 cal dual purpose guns (3×2); 12 × 40 mm guns; 11 × 20 mm guns; 10 × 21-inch (533 mm) torpedo tubes (2×5); 6 × depth charge projectors; 2 × depth charge tracks

USS Frank E. Evans (DD-754), was an Allen M. Sumner-class destroyer in service with the United States Navy. She was named in honor of United States Marine Corps Brigadier General Frank Evans, a leader of the American Expeditionary Force in France during World War I. She served late in World War II and during the Korean War and Vietnam War before she was cut in half in a collision with the Royal Australian Navy aircraft carrier HMAS Melbourne in 1969.

== Construction ==
Frank E. Evans's keel was laid at the Bethlehem Steel Company's shipyard in Staten Island. She was launched on 3 October 1944, sponsored by Mrs. Frank E. Evans, widow of Brigadier General Evans, and commissioned on 3 February 1945.

== Service history ==
=== World War II ===
Frank E. Evans arrived at Pearl Harbor. Territory of Hawaii, on 18 May 1945 for her final training, then crossed the Pacific Ocean to Eniwetok, Guam, Ulithi, and Okinawa on escort duty. Reaching action waters on 24 June 1945, she was assigned to radar picket and local escort duty, often firing on Japanese aircraft. After the close of hostilities in World War II on 15 August 1945, she patrolled the Yellow Sea and the Bohai Sea, embarked released Americans from prisoner-of-war camps near Dalian, Manchuria, and covered occupation landings at Jinsen, Korea.

=== 1946–1949 ===
Frank E. Evans continued to operate in East Asia until 6 March 1946, when she departed Qingdao, China, bound for San Francisco, California. Inactivated there on 31 March 1946, she was decommissioned and placed in reserve on 14 December 1949.

=== Korean War ===
Recommissioned on 15 September 1950 for service in the Korean War, Frank E. Evans sailed from San Diego, California, on 2 January 1951 for duty with the United States Seventh Fleet. On 26 February 1951, she began to play her part in the lengthy siege of Wonsan, during which she engaged North Korean shore batteries 11 times. On 18 June 1951, she was struck by 30 shrapnel hits, which caused minor wounds to four crewmembers, before she silenced the North Korean artillery battery that was firing at her. During this time, Frank E. Evans received the nicknames "Lucky Evans" and the "Gray Ghost". During her tour of duty off Korea, she also bombarded targets in the Songjin-Chongjin area, rescued downed aviators, and coordinated and controlled day and night bombing missions by United Nations aircraft. She returned to San Diego on 4 September 1951.

Frank E. Evans departed on 22 March 1952 for her second Korean War tour, serving on patrol and bombardment duty along the coast of Korea and on the Taiwan Patrol before returning to her new home port, Long Beach, California, on 6 November 1952, where she remained for three months. Her third Korean War tour from 13 June to 20 December 1953 coincided with the Korean armistice that brought the war to a close on 27 July 1953, and was devoted primarily to patrol duty.

=== 1954–1964 ===
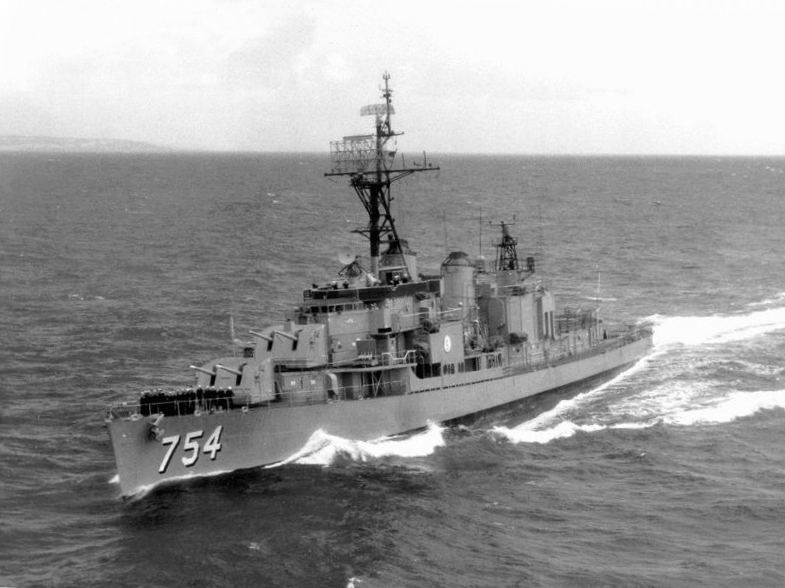
USS Frank E. Evans at sea, April 1963

While riding out Typhoon Pamela in the Taiwan Strait in early November 1954, Frank E. Evans responded to an SOS by the Military Sea Transportation Service cargo ship USNS Muskingum (T-AK-198), which had lost steering control near the center of the storm. Frank E. Evans had escaped to the edge of the typhoon, but turned back into the storm, racing for five hours toward Muskingum to render assistance and taking damage in the process. In the end, Muskingum was able to regain control before Frank E. Evans arrived, but the incident was widely publicized in newspaper syndication because Pulitzer Prize-winning correspondent Homer Bigart was reporting from aboard Frank E. Evans at the time.

From 1954 to 1960, Evans completed five tours of duty in the East Asia and conducted extensive training operations along the United States West Coast and in the Hawaiian Islands, occasionally with Royal Canadian Navy ships.

From 1962 to 1963, Frank E. Evans portrayed the fictitious destroyer USS Appleby in the NBC situation comedy Ensign O'Toole, starring Dean Jones in the title role.

=== Vietnam War ===
During the Vietnam War, Frank E. Evans served in the waters off Vietnam for 12 days from July to September 1965. She again operated in the vicinity of Vietnam for 61 days from August to November 1966. and for 66 days from October 1967 to 20 February 1968. During the Tet Offensive, Frank E. Evans provided naval gunfire support to the United States Army's 101st Airborne Division against the Viet Cong 840th Battalion near Phan Thiết, South Vietnam, on 3 February 1968. She spent an additional 14 days in the Vietnam war zone in 1969.

=== Collision with HMAS Melbourne ===
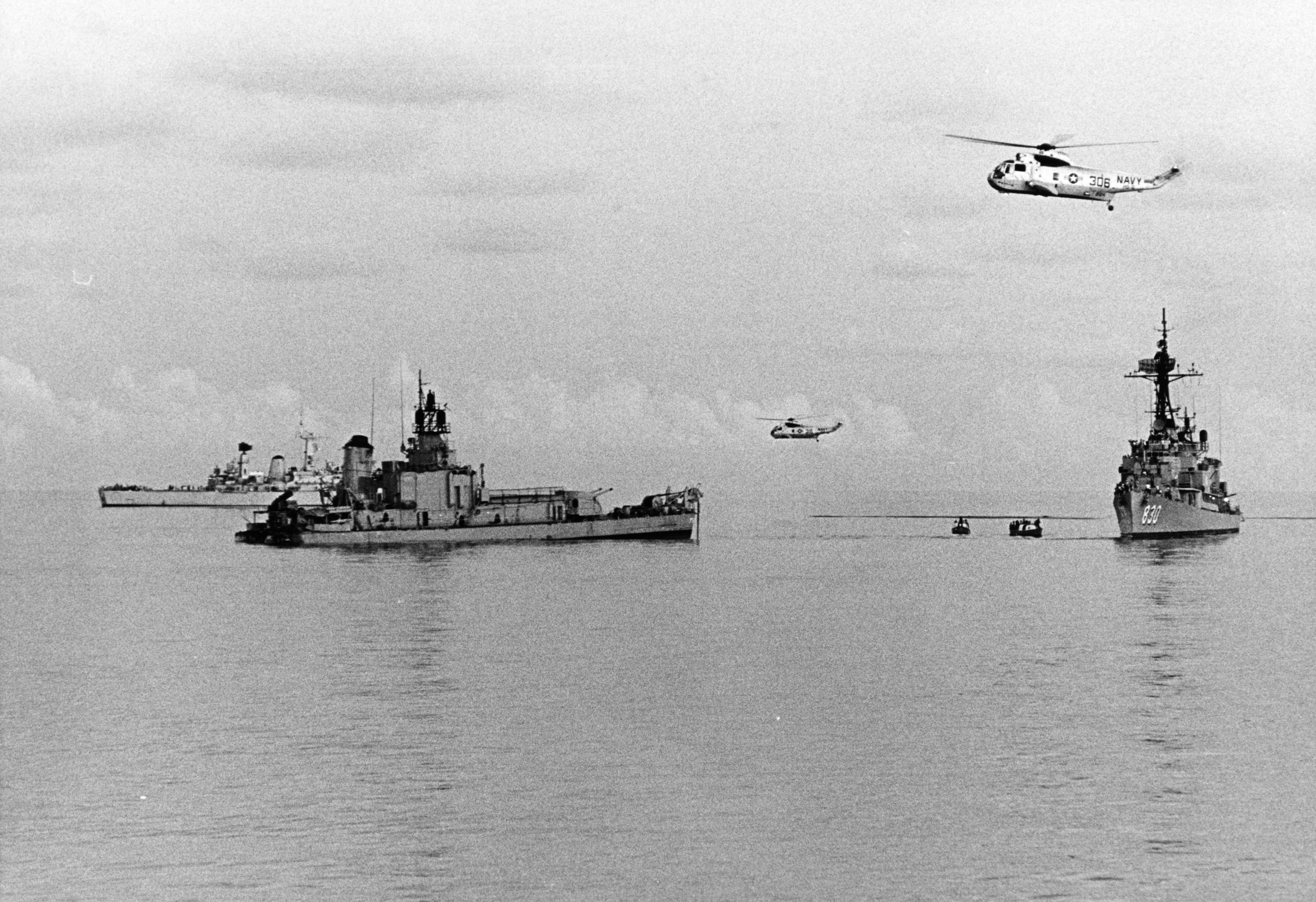
USS Frank E. Evans post-collision

At around 0300 on 3 June 1969, Frank E. Evans was operating in darkness in the South China Sea between Vietnam and Spratly Island in a formation with ships of the Royal Navy, Royal Australian Navy, and Royal New Zealand Navy. All ships in the formation were running without lights. The Royal Australian Navy aircraft carrier Melbourne was in the process of going to flying stations and radioed Frank E. Evans, then to port of her, to take up station as the rescue destroyer. This required Frank E. Evans to reduce speed and take up station on Melbourne's port quarter. The commanding officer of Frank E. Evans was asleep in his quarters, having left instructions to be awakened if there were to be any changes in the formation. Neither the officer of the deck nor the junior officer of the deck notified him when the station change was ordered. The bridge crew also did not contact the combat information center to request clarification of the positions and movements of the surrounding ships.

The conning officer on Frank E. Evans misunderstood the formation's base course and believed Frank E. Evans was to starboard of Melbourne. Frank E. Evans therefore turned to starboard, cutting across Melbourne's bow twice in the process. Melbourne struck Frank E. Evans at a point about 92 feet (28 m) from her bow on her port side and cut her in two at 8°59.2′N 110°47.7′E. After the collision, Frank E. Evans's bow drifted off to the port side of Melbourne and sank in less than five minutes, taking 73 of her crew with it. One body was recovered from the water, making a total of 74 dead. Her stern scraped along the starboard side of Melbourne, and Melbourne's crew attached lines to it. It remained afloat. Around 60 to 100 men were rescued from the water.

== Decommissioning and disposal ==
Frank E. Evans was decommissioned at Subic Bay and struck from the Naval Vessel Register on 1 July 1969. The stern section was sunk as a target in Subic Bay on 10 October 1969.

== Awards ==
Frank E. Evans received one battle star for World War II service, and five for Korean War service. According to the US Navy unit award website, Frank E. Evans had the following awards:

- Captain Edward F. Ney Memorial Award for 1963.
- Vietnam Service Medal for two separate time periods totaling 12 days from 29 July 1965 to 26 September 1965.
- Vietnam Service Medal for three separate time periods totaling 61 days from 11 August 1966 to 24 November 1966.
- Vietnam Service Medal for four separate time periods totaling 66 days from 22 October 1967 to 20 February 1968.
- Republic of Vietnam Meritorious Unit Citation (Vietnam Gallantry Cross Medal Color with Palm) for 7 January 1968 to 12 January 1968.
- Armed Forces Expeditionary Medal for 23 January 1968 to 22 March 1968 coded "J" for Korea, though it appears that the ship was in the vicinity of Vietnam during this time frame.
- Vietnam Service Medal for two separate time periods: 5 May 1969 to 20 May 1969 and 2 January 1969.
- Republic of Vietnam Meritorious Unit Citation (Vietnam Gallantry Cross Medal Color with Palm) for 5 May 1969 to 14 May 1969.
- Navy Unit Commendation for 5 May 1969 to 20 May 1969.

Based on history USS Frank E. Evans was also awarded the following:

- China Service Medal
- Asiatic-Pacific Campaign Medal with one bronze star
- World War II Victory Medal
- Navy Occupation Service Medal with 'Asia' Bar
- National Defense Service Medal with star
- Korean Service Medal with five battle stars
- United Nations Korea Medal
- Vietnam Campaign Medal
- Korean War Service Medal

== In popular culture ==
- In 2013, American songwriter Tom Guerra wrote and recorded "Put Up Their Names (The Ballad of the USS Frank Evans)" which was released with an accompanying video.

== See also ==
- HMAS Voyager, also sunk in a collision with HMAS Melbourne in 1964.
