= Outline of the British Royal Navy at the end of the Cold War =

In 1989 the Royal Navy was under the direction of the Navy Department in the UK Ministry of Defence. It had two main commands, CINCFLEET and Naval Home Command.

The First Sea Lord and Chief of the Naval Staff was an Admiral who commanded Her Majesty's Naval Service. Admiral Sir Julian Oswald KCB had assumed the post in May 1989. Oswald was promoted to Admiral of the Fleet on his retirement in March 1993. The First Sea Lord/CNS was a member of the Chiefs of Staff Committee, the Defence Council, the Admiralty Board and the Navy Board.

The strength of the Royal Navy in 1989 was 65,500 men. Jane's Fighting Ships 1989–1990 gives the strength as at 1 January 1989 as 65,484 (RN male and female 57,778, Royal Marines 7,706).

== Navy Department (Ministry of Defence) ==
At the end of the Cold War in 1989, the Royal Navy structure was as follows:

=== First Sea Lord and Chief of Naval Staff ===
The First Sea Lord and Chief of the Naval Staff (1SL/CNS) was based in Whitehall, London. His principal staff officers were:

- Second Sea Lord, Admiral, responsible for personnel and naval shore establishments
  - Admiralty Interview Board
- Controller of the Navy, Admiral, former Third Sea Lord, responsible for procurement and matériel
- Chief of Fleet Support, Vice Admiral, former Fourth Sea Lord, responsible for dockyard organisation and fleet maintenance
- Assistant Chief of the Naval Staff, Rear Admiral, head of the Naval Staff
- Naval Secretary, Rear Admiral, responsible for policy direction on personnel management
- Hydrographer of the Navy, Rear Admiral

The Naval Service consisted of the following components

- Royal Navy, including Royal Naval Reserve
- Royal Marines, including Royal Marines Reserve
- Royal Fleet Auxiliary
- Royal Naval Auxiliary Service
- Royal Maritime Auxiliary Service
- Royal Naval Supply and Transport Service
- Royal Corps of Naval Constructors
- Women's Royal Naval Service, including Women's Royal Naval Reserve
- Queen Alexandra's Royal Naval Nursing Service, including Queen Alexandra's Royal Naval Nursing Service Reserve
- Admiralty Research Establishment, Portsdown

== Commander-in-Chief Fleet ==
The Commander-in-Chief Fleet (CINCFLEET) was an Admiral based at Northwood Headquarters commanded the Royal Navy and Royal Marines. He also doubled as NATO Commander-in-Chief, Eastern Atlantic Area (CINCEASTLANT) and Commander-in-Chief Channel (CINCHAN). CINCFLEET was responsible for the operation, resourcing and training of the ships, submarines and aircraft, and personnel the Royal Navy, including of the Royal Naval Reserve, Royal Marines, and Royal Marines Reserve. Squadrons had a purely administrative role, devoted to operational readiness and training.

=== Flag Officer First Flotilla ===
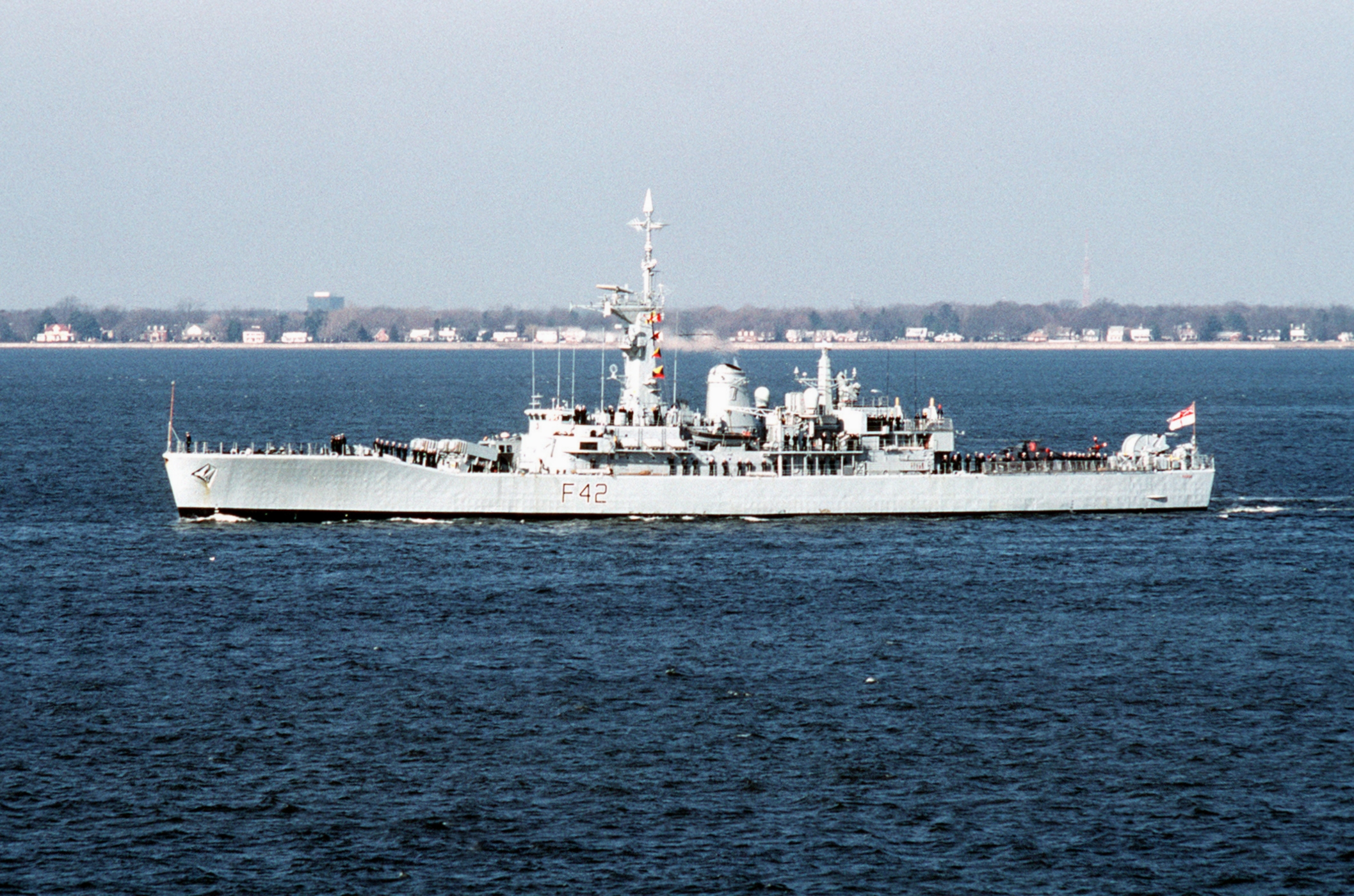
The Leander-class frigate HMS Phoebe in the Hampton Roads

The Flag Officer First Flotilla (FOF1) was a rear admiral based HMNB Portsmouth who commanded the navy's First Flotilla.

- First Flotilla, HMNB Portsmouth
  - 1st Frigate Squadron, HMNB Devonport with
    - Type 22 frigates (Batch 2): HMS Boxer, HMS Beaver, HMS Brave, HMS London, HMS Sheffield, HMS Coventry
  - 2nd Frigate Squadron, HMNB Devonport with
    - Type 22 frigates (Batch 1): HMS Broadsword, HMS Battleaxe, HMS Brilliant, HMS Brazen
  - 5th Destroyer Squadron, HMNB Portsmouth with
    - Type 42 destroyers: HMS Newcastle, HMS Exeter, HMS Southampton, HMS Manchester, HMS Gloucester, HMS Cardiff
  - 6th Frigate Squadron, HMNB Devonport with
    - Leander-class frigates (Batch 3A): HMS Andromeda, HMS Hermione, HMS Jupiter, HMS Scylla, HMS Charybdis
    - Dartmouth Training Squadron (JFS 1989, p. 651)
      - Type 82 destroyer: HMS Bristol, Leander-class frigates (Batch 3B): HMS Ariadne, HMS Achilles

=== Flag Officer, Second Flotilla ===
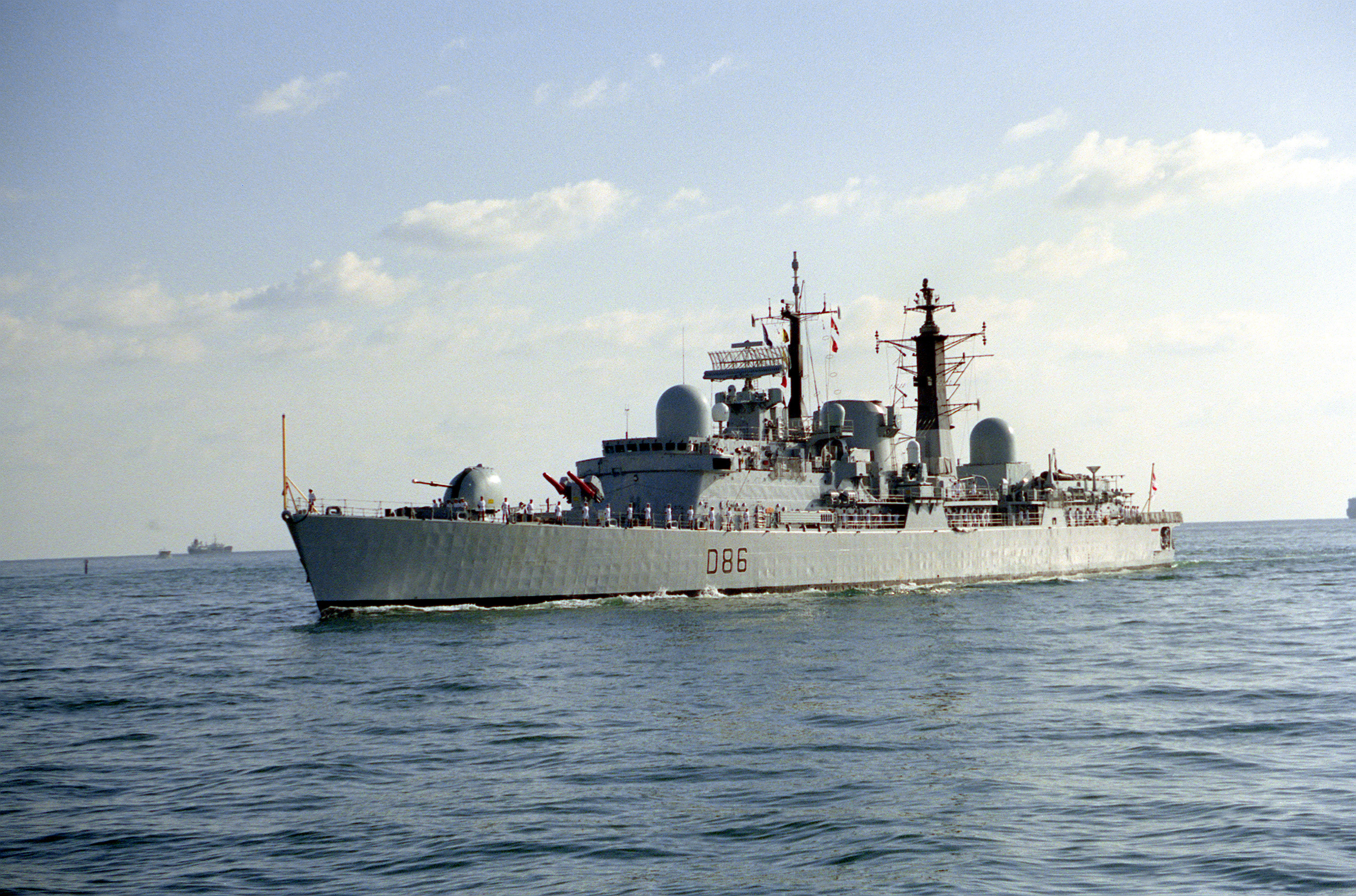
The Type 42 destroyer HMS Birmingham entering Port Everglades in Florida

The Flag Officer, Second Flotilla was a rear admiral based HMNB Devonport who commanded the navy's Second Flotilla.

- Second Flotilla, with ships based HMNB Devonport:
  - 3rd Destroyer Squadron, Rosyth Dockyard with
    - Type 42 destroyers: HMS Birmingham, HMS Glasgow, HMS Nottingham, HMS Liverpool, HMS Edinburgh, HMS York
  - 4th Frigate Squadron, HMNB Devonport with
    - Type 21 frigates: HMS Amazon, HMS Active, HMS Ambuscade, HMS Arrow, HMS Alacrity, HMS Avenger
  - 7th Frigate Squadron, HMNB Devonport with
    - Leander-class frigates (Batch 2): HMS Cleopatra, HMS Arethusa (Batch 1, decommissioned April 1989), HMS Sirius, HMS Phoebe, HMS Danae, HMS Argonaut, HMS Penelope
  - 8th Frigate Squadron, HMNB Devonport with
    - Type 22 frigates (Batch 3): HMS Cumberland, HMS Campbeltown, HMS Chatham (commissioned 4 May 1990), HMS Cornwall

=== Flag Officer, Third Flotilla ===
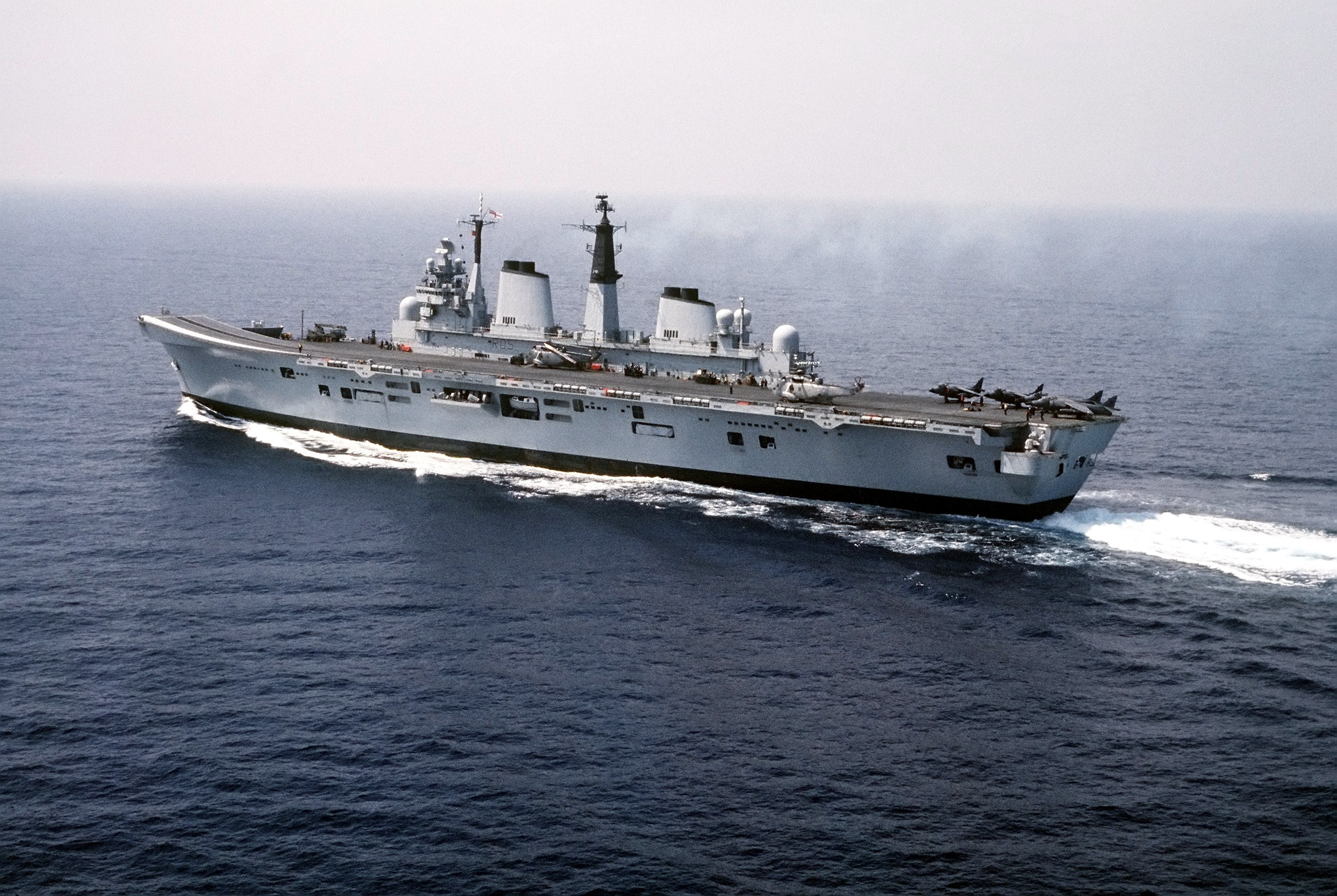
HMS Invincible during NATO exercise Dragon Hammer 90

The Flag Officer, Third Flotilla was a rear admiral based HMNB Portsmouth who commanded the navy's Third Flotilla and doubled as NATO Commander Anti-Submarine Warfare Striking Force. Third Flotilla contained all aircraft carriers and amphibious assault ships of the Navy. In 1989 Vice Admiral Alan Grose held this appointment.

- Third Flotilla, HMNB Portsmouth
  - HMS Invincible, HMS Illustrious (refit at HMNB Devonport), HMS Ark Royal, HMS Intrepid, RFA Argus, RFA Engadine (decommissioned March 1989), HMS Challenger (K07), HMS Endurance (ice patrol vessel)

=== Flag Officer Scotland and Northern Ireland ===
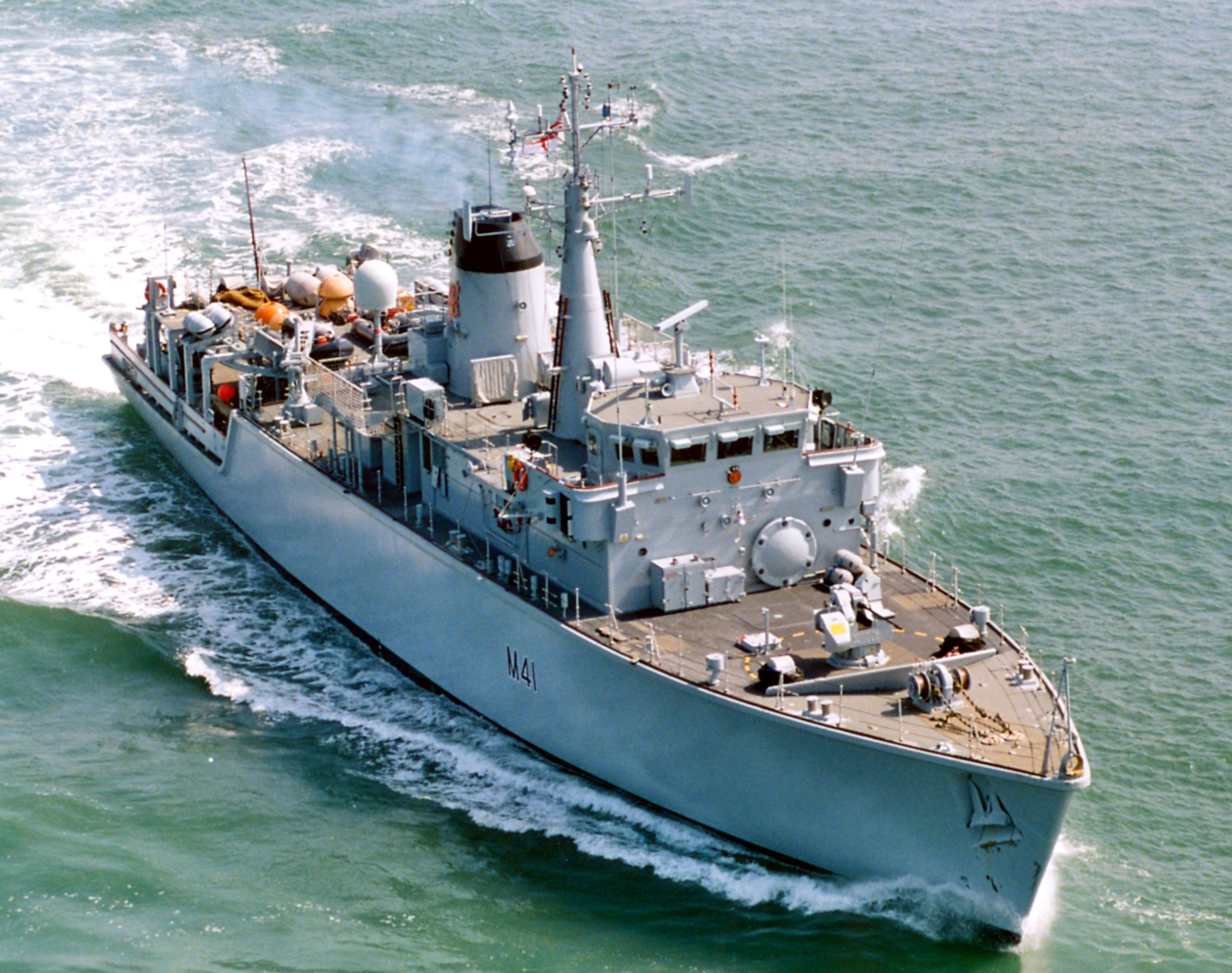
The Hunt-class mine countermeasures vessel HMS Quorn leaving port

The Flag Officer Scotland and Northern Ireland (FOSNI) was a vice admiral based at RAF Pitreavie Castle, who commanded the navy's units in Scotland and Northern Ireland. On 31 January 1977, newly promoted Vice-Admiral Cameron Rusby was appointed as FOSNI, and double-hatted as NATO Commander Northern Sub-Area, Eastern Atlantic (NORLANT) and Commander Nore Sub-Area Channel (NORECHAN). The main unit under his command was the Mine Countermeasures Flotilla based at Rosyth Dockyard on the Firth of Forth, which was commanded by a commodore. Additionally the Second Flotilla's 3rd Destroyer Squadron was based at RN Dockyard Rosyth. In war FOSNI would have been one of two naval operational commands, with the other being Flag Officer Plymouth.

- Flag Officer Scotland and Northern Ireland, RAF Pitreavie Castle, Rosyth
  - Mine Countermeasures Flotilla, Royal Naval Dockyard Rosyth
    - 1st Mine Countermeasures Squadron, RN Dockyard Rosyth with
      - Hunt-class mine countermeasures vessels: HMS Brecon, HMS Middleton, HMS Berkeley, HMS Quorn
    - 2nd Mine Countermeasures Squadron, RN Dockyard Rosyth with
      - Hunt-class mine countermeasures vessels: HMS Cattistock, HMS Cottesmore, HMS Chiddingfold, HMS Atherstone, HMS Hurworth
    - 3rd Mine Countermeasures Squadron, HMNB Portsmouth with
      - Ton-class minesweepers: HMS Hubberston, HMS Iveston, HMS Sheraton, HMS Brinton, HMS Brereton, HMS Maxton (decommissioned August 1989)
      - Sandown-class minehunter: HMS Sandown (commissioned 9 June 1989)
    - 4th Mine Countermeasures Squadron, RN Dockyard Rosyth with
      - Hunt-class mine countermeasures vessels: HMS Ledbury, HMS Brocklesby, HMS Dulverton, HMS Bicester
    - 10th Mine Countermeasures Squadron, manned by the Royal Naval Reserve and each of the squadron's ships assigned to a reserve divisions:
      - River-class minesweepers: HMS Waveney, HMS Carron, HMS Dovey, HMS Helford, HMS Humber, HMS Blackwater, HMS Itchen, HMS Helmsdale, HMS Orwell, HMS Ribble, HMS Spey, HMS Arun
    - Fishery Protection Squadron, RN Dockyard Rosyth with:
      - Ton-class minesweepers: HMS Kellington, HMS Soberton, HMS Upton
      - Castle-class patrol vessel: HMS Dumbarton Castle
      - Island-class patrol vessels: HMS Anglesey, HMS Alderney, HMS Jersey, HMS Guernsey, HMS Shetland, HMS Orkney, HMS Lindisfarne
    - Northern Ireland Patrol Squadron, Belfast Harbour with
      - Ton-class minesweepers: HMS Cuxton, HMS Kedleston, HMS Nurton, HMS Wilton (built with glass-reinforced plastic)
      - Bird-class patrol vessels: HMS Cygnet, HMS Kingfisher, HMS Redpole

=== Flag Officer Plymouth ===
The Flag Officer Plymouth was a vice admiral based at Admiralty House, who commanded the navy's units in England and Wales and double-hatted as Naval Base Commander Devonport, NATO Commander Central Sub-Area (CENTLANT) and Commander Plymouth Sub-Area Channel (PLYMCHAN). In war Flag Officer Plymouth would have been one of two naval operational commands, with the other being Flag Officer Scotland and Northern Ireland.

=== Flag Officer Submarines ===
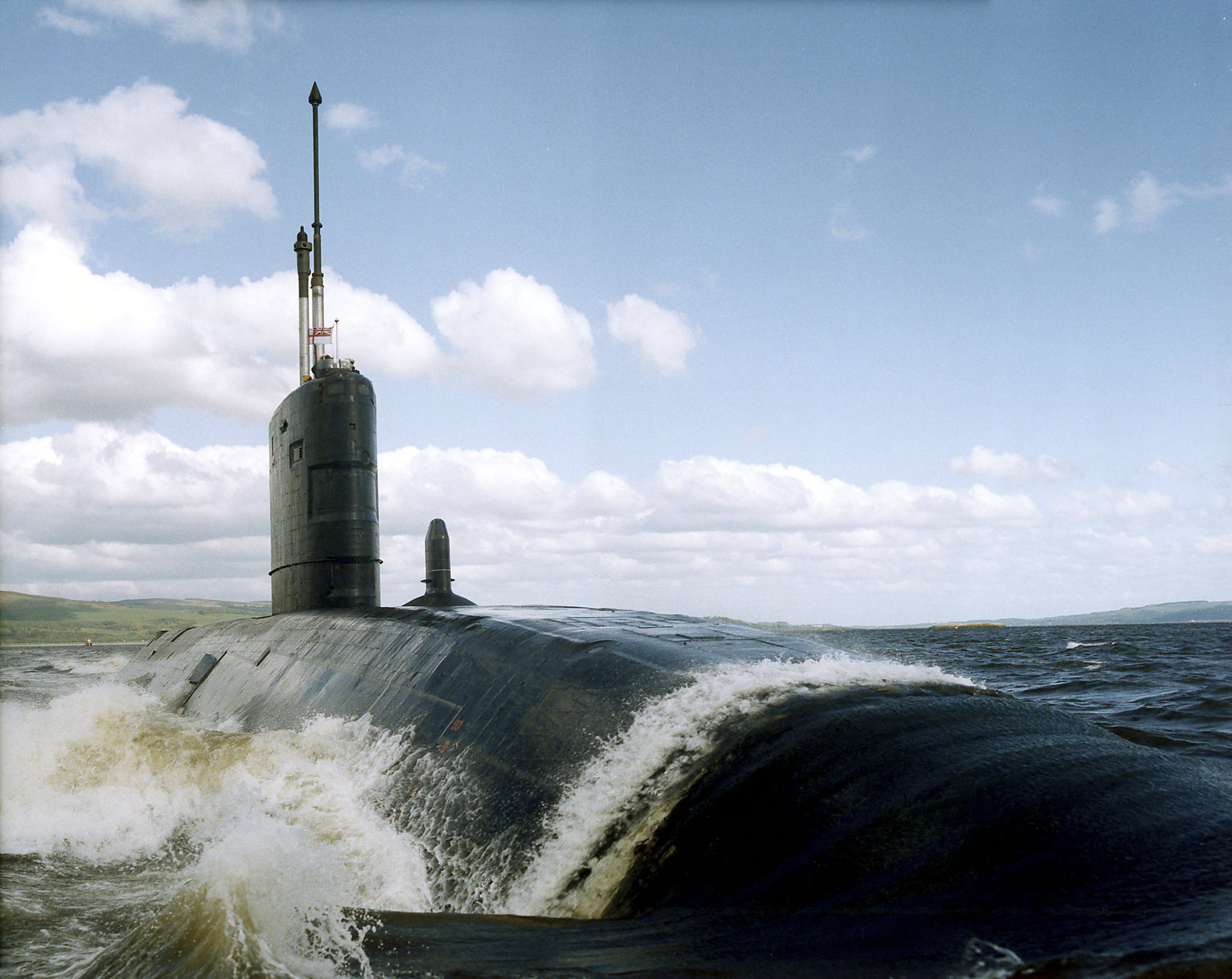
The Swiftsure-class submarine HMS Superb on the Clyde in Scotland

The Flag Officer Submarines was a rear admiral based at Northwood Headquarters, who commanded the Royal Navy Submarine Service and double-hatted as NATO Commander Submarine Force Eastern Atlantic (COMSUBEASTLANT).

- Flag Officer Submarines (FOSM), Northwood Headquarters, Eastbury
  - 1st Submarine Squadron, HMS Dolphin with
    - Oberon-class submarines: HMS Orpheus (only harbour service), HMS Olympus (sold to Canada in 1989), HMS Osiris (sold to Canada in 1989), HMS Onslaught, HMS Otter, HMS Otus, HMS Opossum, HMS Opportune, HMS Onyx
  - 2nd Submarine Squadron, HMNB Devonport with
    - Swiftsure-class submarines: HMS Swiftsure, HMS Splendid (refit at HMNB Devonport), HMS Superb
    - Trafalgar-class submarines: HMS Trafalgar, HMS Turbulent, HMS Tireless, HMS Torbay, HMS Trenchant, HMS Talent (commissioned 12 May 1990)
  - 3rd Submarine Squadron, HMNB Clyde with
    - Oberon-class submarines: HMS Odin, HMS Oracle, HMS Ocelot
    - Churchill-class submarines: HMS Churchill (refit at RN Dockyard Rosyth), HMS Conqueror, HMS Courageous
    - Valiant-class submarines: HMS Valiant, HMS Warspite (refit at HMNB Devonport)
    - Swiftsure-class submarines: HMS Sceptre, HMS Spartan, HMS Sovereign
  - 10th Submarine Squadron, HMNB Clyde with
    - Resolution-class ballistic missile submarines: HMS Resolution, HMS Repulse, HMS Renown (refit at RN Dockyard Rosyth), HMS Revenge

=== Flag Officer Naval Air Command ===
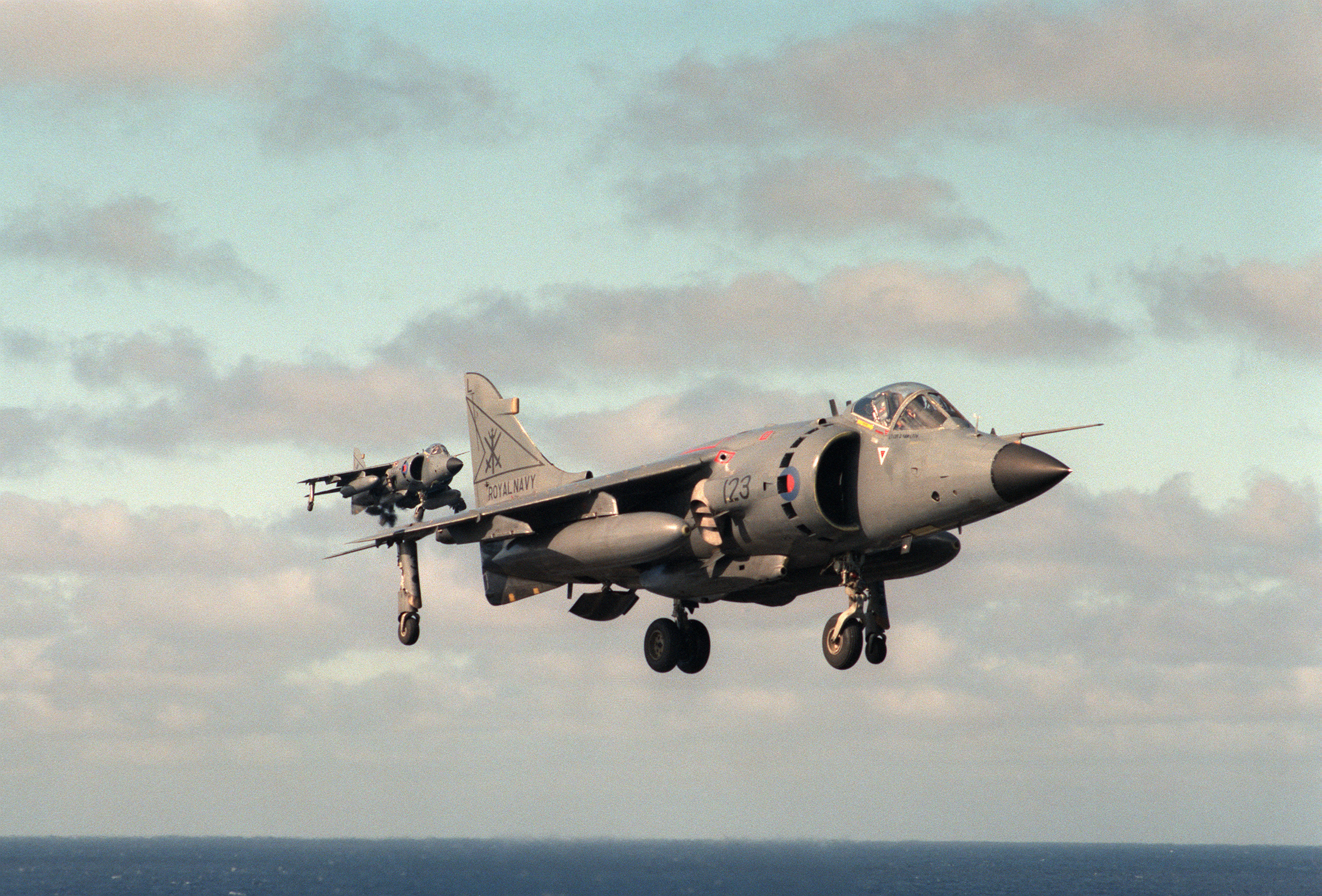
Two Sea Harriers from 800 Naval Air Squadron approach the flight deck of U.S. Navy aircraft carrier USS Dwight D. Eisenhower.

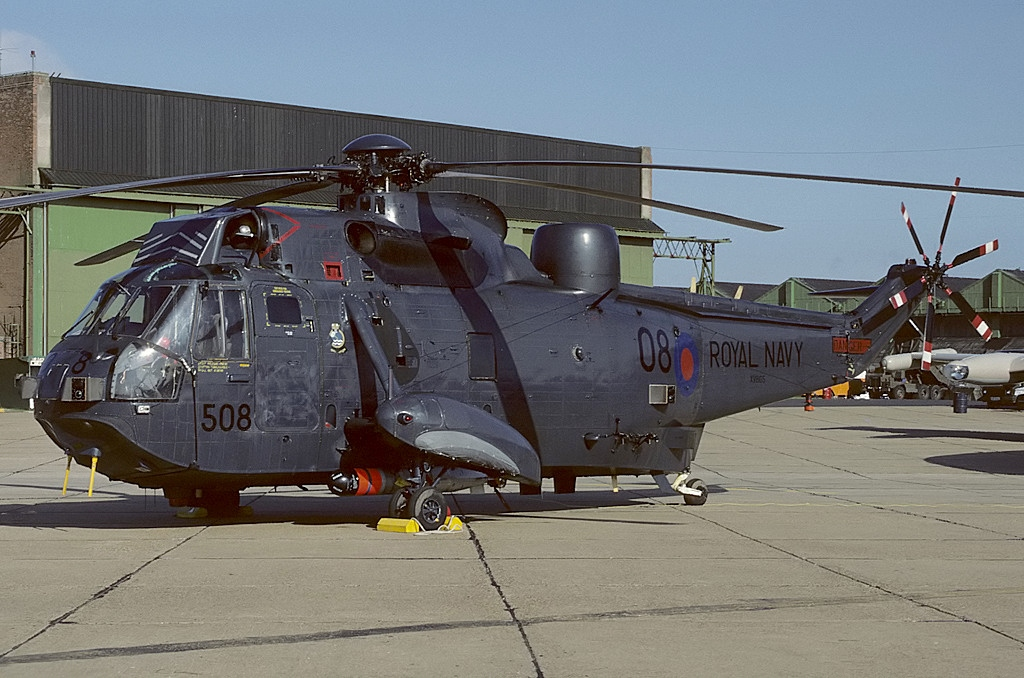
A Sea King HAS.6 from 814 Naval Air Squadron armed with torpedoes at RNAS Culdrose

The Flag Officer Naval Air Command was a rear admiral based at RNAS Yeovilton, who commanded the Fleet Air Arm.

- Flag Officer Naval Air Command (FONAC), RNAS Yeovilton
  - RNAS Prestwick:
    - 819 Naval Air Squadron (Anti-submarine, Sea King HAS.5)
    - 824 Naval Air Squadron (Anti-submarine, Sea King HAS.6) (disbanded August 1989)
  - RNAS Yeovilton:
    - 707 Naval Air Squadron (Air assault, Sea King HC.4)
    - 800 Naval Air Squadron (Sea Harrier FRS.1, being upgraded to F(A).2)
    - 801 Naval Air Squadron (Sea Harrier FRS.1, being upgraded to F(A).2)
    - 845 Naval Air Squadron (Air assault, Sea King HC.4)
    - 846 Naval Air Squadron (Air assault, Sea King HC.4)
    - 899 Naval Air Squadron (Training, Sea Harrier FRS.1, Sea Harrier T.4A/T.4N, Hunter T.8M)
    - Fleet Requirements and Aircraft Direction Unit (Canberra TT.18, Hunter GA.11/T.8, Dassault Falcon 20)
  - RNAS Culdrose:
    - 705 Naval Air Squadron (Basic helicopter training, Gazelle HT.2/HT.3)
    - 706 Naval Air Squadron (Sea King training, various Sea King)
      - Sea King Training Unit (RAF unit attached to 706 Naval Air Squadron, 2x Sea King HAR.3)
    - 750 Naval Air Squadron (Observer training, Jetstream T.2)
    - 771 Naval Air Squadron (Search & Rescue, Sea King HAR.5)
    - 814 Naval Air Squadron (Anti-submarine, Sea King HAS.5)
    - 820 Naval Air Squadron (Anti-submarine, Sea King HAS.6)
    - 826 Naval Air Squadron (Anti-submarine, Sea King HAS.6)
    - 849 Naval Air Squadron (Airborne early warning and control, 10x Sea King AEW.2A)
  - RNAS Portland:
    - 702 Naval Air Squadron (Training, Lynx HAS.3S)
    - 772 Naval Air Squadron (Air assault, Sea King HC.4)
    - 810 Naval Air Squadron (Anti-submarine, Sea King HAS.5, began conversion to HAS.6 in October 1989)
    - 815 Naval Air Squadron (Frigate & destroyer helicopters, Lynx HAS.3S, most deployed on frigates and destroyers at sea)
    - 829 Naval Air Squadron (Frigate & destroyer helicopters, Lynx HAS.3S, most deployed on frigates and destroyers at sea)
    - Lynx HMA.8 trials unit (formed in September 1989)
  - Roborough:
    - Flying Grading Flight (Chipmunk T.10)

=== Commandant General Royal Marines ===
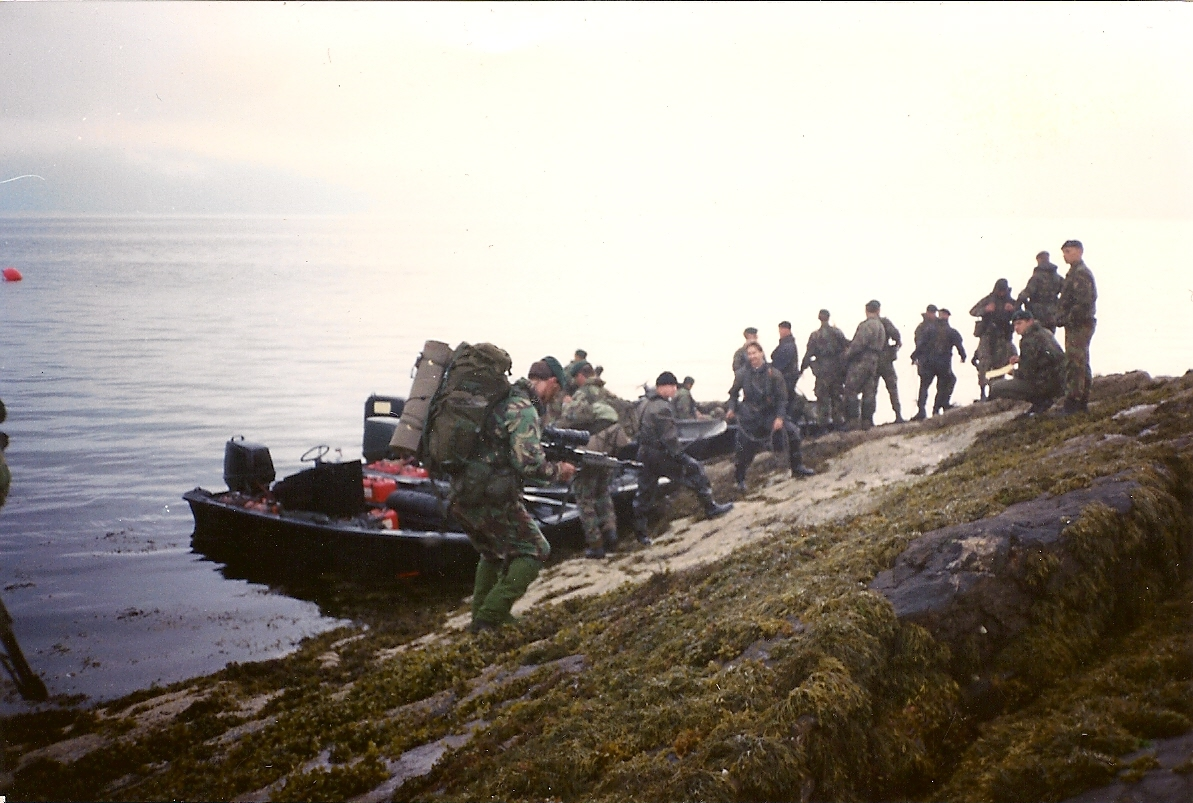
Royal Marines during an exercise in Scotland

The Commandant General Royal Marines, in 1989 Lieutenant General Sir Martin Garrod based at Whitehall, was the service head of the Royal Marines. In 1991 their structure was described as "very top heavy. They have nearly 8,000 men to put 2,400 in the field...they have three 'tied' generals, the Commandant General, a major general as his chief of staff, and a major general commando forces."

- Commandant General Royal Marines, London
  - Major General Commando Forces
    - MGCF was responsible for all regular commando forces. He commanded HQ Commando Forces at Plymouth which consisted of his staff and support personnel designed to facilitate deployment of commando units and amphibious operations. Although not its primary role this HQ was capable of operating as a divisional HQ, the role it took in the Falklands war. This was the only divisional HQ in the British armed forces capable of commanding amphibious operations.
  - 3 Commando Brigade, Plymouth
    - Headquarters and Signals Squadron Royal Marines, Plymouth
      - Headquarters Squadron, including the Intelligence and Information Activities Cells
      - Y Squadron - Electronic Warfare
      - Air Defense Troop (16 x Javelin MANPADS),
      - Communications Squadron
      - Logistics Squadron
        - Motor Transportation Troop
        - Royal Marines Police Troop
        - Catering Troop
        - Stores Troop
        - Equipment Support Troop
    - 40 Commando, Taunton
    - 42 Commando, Bickleigh
    - 45 Commando, Arbroath
    - 4 Assault Squadron, Plymouth (4x LCU Mk.9, 4x LCVP Mk.4, 2x Centurion BARV), served aboard HMS Fearless (L10)
    - 6 Assault Squadron, Plymouth (4x LCU Mk.9, 4x LCVP Mk.4, 2x Centurion BARV), served aboard HMS Intrepid (L11)
    - 539 Assault Squadron, Plymouth (2x LCU Mk.9, 4x LCVP Mk.4, Rigid Raiding Craft MK1, Gemini Inflatable Raiding Craft). This unit was part of 3 Commando Brigades order of battle and responsible for providing integral operational amphibious movement capability to the brigade.
    - 3 Commando Brigade Air Squadron, RNAS Yeovilton (12x Gazelle AH.1, 6x Lynx AH.1)
    - 2 Raiding Squadron, Royal Marines (Reserve), Plymouth
    - 29 Commando Regiment Royal Artillery, Royal Citadel, Plymouth HQ Battery, 3 Gun batteries (18x L118 light gun), Naval Gunfire Support Forward Observation (NGSFO) battery (British Army Commando Unit).
      - 289 Commando Battery, Royal Artillery (Volunteers), Royal Artillery battery equipped with 6x L118 light guns. (British Territorial Army Commando Unit).
    - 20 Commando Battery Royal Artillery (Air Defense), (From April 1990 onwards, 1987-1989 G Troop formed as a precursor air defense unit supporting 3 Commando brigade before being expanded to battery strength) Air Defense Artillery, equipped with Javelin MANPADS air defense missile system (British Army Commando Unit).
    - 59 Commando Squadron Royal Engineers, (British Army Commando Unit).
    - 131 Commando Squadron Royal Engineers (V), (British Territorial Army Commando Unit).
    - Commando Logistic Regiment, (Combined Royal Marine/British Army Commando Unit).
    - 383 Commando Petroleum Troop (V), (British Territorial Army Commando Unit).
    - Royal Marines Police, Plymouth
    - Mountain And Arctic Warfare Cadre, Stonehouse Barracks, Plymouth, provided instruction in mountain warfare, arctic warfare, cold weather survival and operations, and cliff assault with a secondary role as long-range reconnaissance force for 3 Commando Brigade in wartime.

3 Commando Brigade was a light amphibious brigade, the primary deployable formation of the Royal Marines, it contained the bulk of the corps combat power along with support units from the British army and the royal navy. Additional units from the British army, including a light armoured squadron and 30 signal regiment, the royal signals were earmarked for deployment in times of war. Additional assets such as artillery, engineers and special forces would likely be assigned based on the brigades mission.

- Major General Training Reserve and Special Forces RM
    - Comacchio Group, HMNB Clyde, guarded HMNB Clyde and the UK's naval nuclear weapons stored at RNAD Coulport
    - Commando Training Centre Royal Marines, Lympstone
    - Royal Marines Reserve (RMR), Plymouth
      - RMR Bristol, Bristol
      - RMR London, Wandsworth
      - RMR Merseyside, Liverpool
      - RMR Scotland, Edinburgh
      - RMR Tyne, Newcastle
- Special Boat Service, (Royal Marine Special Forces), RM Poole, Dorset. Under the operational control of the Director of Special Forces, specializing in maritime and amphibious roles.

=== Flag Officer Gibraltar/Gibraltar Naval Base Commander ===
The Flag Officer Gibraltar, Gibraltar Naval Base Commander, based in Gibraltar was a Royal Navy Rear Admiral, who double-hatted as NATO's Commander Gibraltar Mediterranean (COMGIBMED).

- Flag Officer Gibraltar and Gibraltar Naval Base Commander
  - Gibraltar Squadron: HMS Cormorant, HMS Hart

== Commander-in-Chief Naval Home Command / Flag Officer Portsmouth ==
The Commander-in-Chief Naval Home Command (CINCNAVHOME) was an admiral based HMNB Portsmouth, who doubled as Flag Officer, Portsmouth and Naval Base Commander Portsmouth. Naval Home Command was tasked with administrative and support functions.

=== Fleet Operational Standards and Training ===
The Fleet Operational Standards and Training(FOST) was a rear admiral based at RN Dockyard Portland, who was responsible for the operational training of the navy's units. In 1989 Rear Admiral R.T. Newman held this appointment.

=== Flag Officer Training and Recruitment ===
The Flag Officer, Training and Recruitment was a rear admiral based in HMNB Portsmouth, who was responsible for recruiting personnel and basic training. Besides recruiting offices dispersed all over the United Kingdom, FOTR also commanded the navy's schools and colleges.

- Flag Officer Training and Recruitment (FOTR), HMNB Portsmouth
  - HMS Raleigh, Torpoint, entry and basic training, and Royal Naval Supply School
  - HMS Sultan, Gosport, engineering training, and Royal Navy Air Engineering and Survival School
  - Britannia Royal Naval College, Dartmouth

==== University Royal Naval Units ====
University Royal Naval Units (URNU) were training organizations affiliated with universities. 14 URNUs had been founded in 1967 and the late 1980s each URNU received one Archer-class patrol vessel as dedicated training vessel. However, as four of the 14 Archer vessels went to the Royal Naval Auxiliary Service it is unclear how many URNUs were still active in 1989.

=== Flag Officer Reserves ===
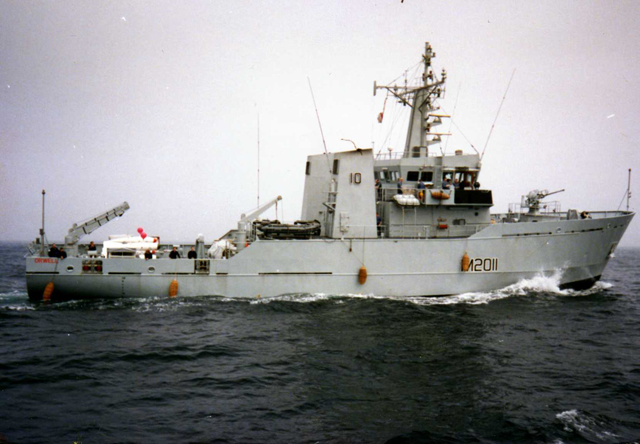
The Royal Naval Reserve minesweeper HMS Orwell in the Bay of Biscay en route to Gibraltar

The Flag Officer Reserves was a rear admiral based in Whitehall, who was responsible for recruitment and training of the Royal Naval Reserve. Each Royal Naval Reserve Division had one River-class minesweeper from the Mine Countermeasures Flotilla's 10th Mine Countermeasures Squadron assigned to train its reservists and in case of war would have manned the assigned minesweeper.

- Flag Officer Reserves (FOR), Whitehall
  - Royal Naval Reserve (RNR)
    - Tay Division, Dundee (HMS Helmsdale)
    - Forth Division, Edinburgh (HMS Spey)
    - Clyde Division, Govan (HMS Dovey)
    - South Wales Division, Swansea (HMS Waveney)
    - Ulster Division, Lisburn (HMS Helford)
    - London Division, London (HMS Humber)
    - Tyne Division, Gateshead (HMS Orwell)
    - Sussex Division, Brighton (HMS Arun)
    - Solent Division, Portsmouth (HMS Itchen)
    - Severn Division, Bristol (HMS Carron)
    - Mersey Division, Liverpool (HMS Ribble)

==== Royal Navy Medical Service ====
The Royal Navy Medical Service headed by the Medical Director-General of the Navy was responsible for the medical care aboard ships and in shore establishment of the Royal Navy. It worked closely with the Queen Alexandra's Royal Naval Nursing Service, which however was not part of the Royal Navy.

==== Royal Navy Regulating Branch ====
The Royal Navy Regulating Branch was the service police of the Royal Navy, excluding the Royal Marines, which had their own police force.

==== Judge Advocate of the Fleet ====
The Judge Advocate of the Fleet was an appointed civilian judge who was responsible for the supervision and superintendence of the court martial system in the Royal Navy. The Judge Advocate was based at Whitehall in London.

==== Royal Navy Chaplaincy Service ====
The Royal Navy Chaplaincy Service provided chaplains to the Royal Navy and Royal Marines Chaplains are recruited from a number of Christian denominations and trained at the Britannia Royal Naval College.

=== Royal Fleet Auxiliary ===
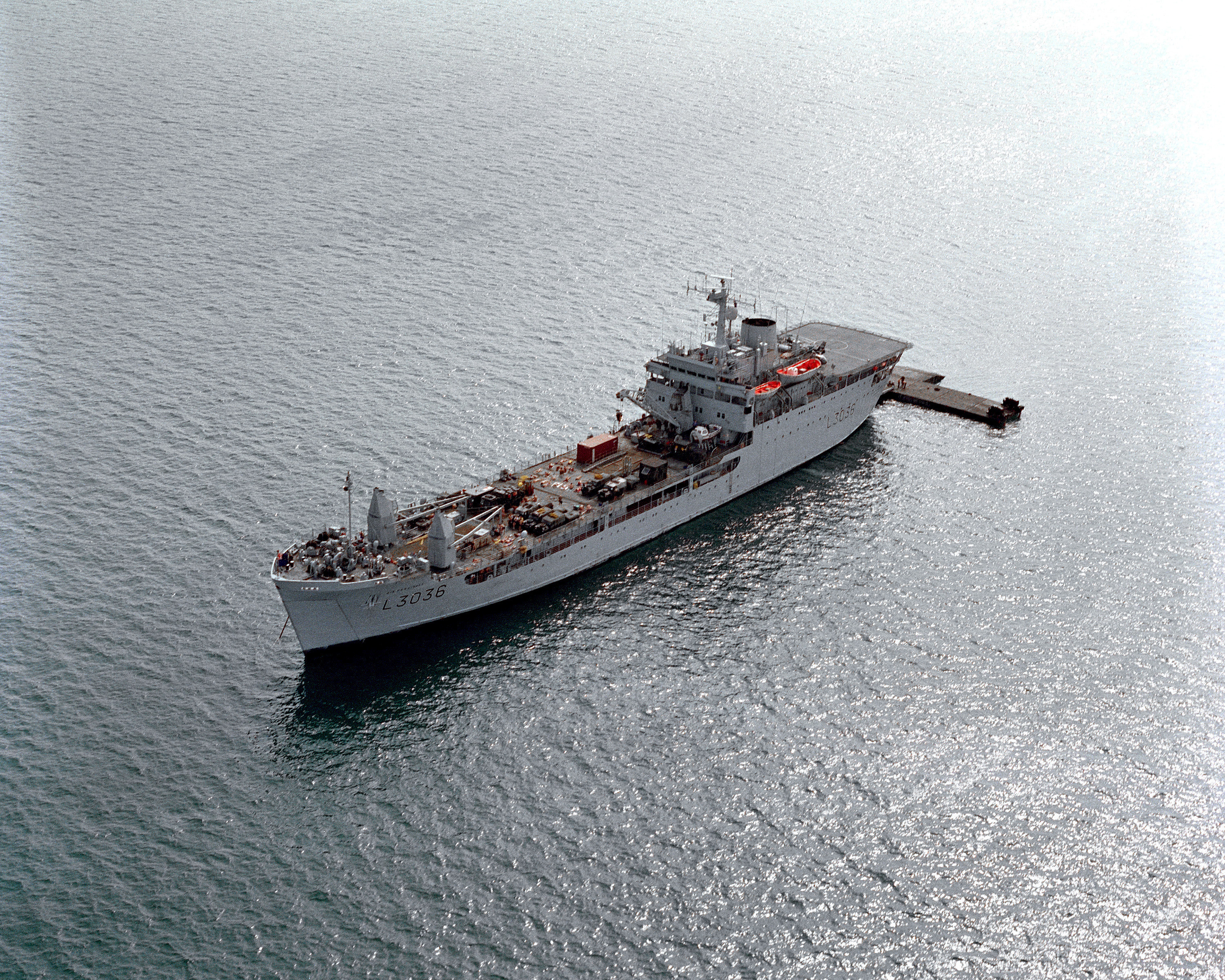
Round Table-class landing ship logistics RFA Sir Percivale at anchor

The Royal Fleet Auxiliary (RFA) was a civilian-manned fleet owned by the Ministry of Defence, whose purpose was to support the Royal Navy. The RFA was tasked to supply Royal Navy's ships at sea with fuel, ammunition and supplies via replenishment at sea. It also transported Army and Royal Marine personnel.

RFA vessels were commanded and crewed by civilians, augmented with regular and reserve Royal Navy personnel to perform specialised military functions such as operating and maintaining helicopters or providing hospital facilities. RFA ships carried the ship prefix "RFA". The following is a list of RFA ships in 1989:

- Forward repair ship: RFA Diligence
- Round Table-class landing and logistics ship: RFA Sir Bedivere, RFA Sir Galahad, RFA Sir Geraint, RFA Sir Lancelot (decommissioned March 1989), RFA Sir Percivale, RFA Sir Tristram
- Regent-class munitions replenishment ships: RFA Resource, RFA Regent
- Ol-class fast fleet tankers: RFA Olwen, RFA Olna, RFA Olmeda
- Rover-class small fleet tankers: RFA Green Rover, RFA Grey Rover, RFA Blue Rover, RFA Gold Rover, RFA Black Rover
- Tide-class replenishment oiler: RFA Tidespring
- Leaf-class support tankers: RFA Appleleaf (decommissioned and sold to Australia September 1989), RFA Brambleleaf, RFA Bayleaf, RFA Orangeleaf, RFA Oakleaf
- Fort Rosalie-class fleet replenishment ships: RFA Fort Grange, RFA Fort Austin

=== Royal Naval Auxiliary Service ===
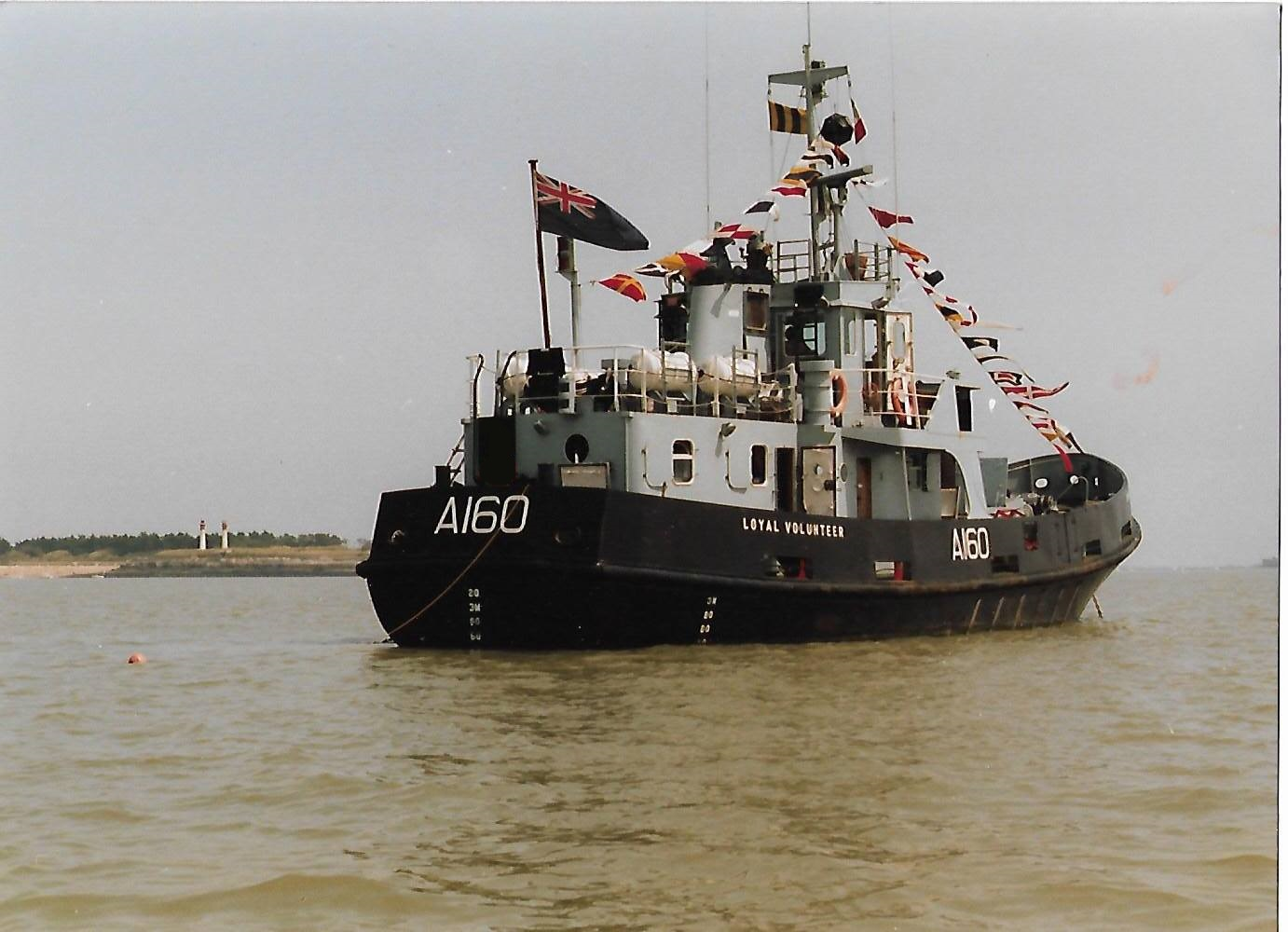
The Royal Naval Auxiliary Service vessel Loyal Volunteer on a port visit in Rochfort, Brittany

The Royal Naval Auxiliary Service (RNXS) was a uniformed, unarmed, civilian volunteer service, administered and trained by the Royal Navy to operate in the ports and anchorages of the UK in an Emergency. The service was divided into 'Afloat' and 'Shore' sections: the "Afloat" personnel manned the Service's dedicated ships and the "Shore" personnel manned the Port Headquarters (PHQ). The Afloat sections contained engineers, seamen and communications personnel, while the "shore" section consisted of communications and plotting staff.

RNXS personnel, known as auxiliarymen regardless of gender, were to be readily available to assist in the tasks of evacuating major ports and dispatching merchant vessels overseas in case of an attack on the UK. Any remaining ships were to be dispersed to safe anchorages along the coasts or at nearby islands. Formation, planning and sailing of convoys were trained by the PHQs under Royal Naval Reserve control. RNXS ships carried the ship prefix "XSV" and the service maintained training units, and inshore vessels, known as the "Loyals", at most major ports in the UK. It also had four unarmed Archer-class patrol vessels in service: XSV Example, XSV Explorer, XSV Express and XSV Exploit.

=== Royal Maritime Auxiliary Service ===
The Royal Maritime Auxiliary Service (RMAS) was a civilian agency, which ran a variety of auxiliary vessels for Her Majesty's Naval Service. The RMAS provided ammunition transports, research vessels, salvage vessels, torpedo retrievers, dive tenders, fleet tenders, lifting crafts, and harbour and oceangoing tugs. RMAS vessels carried the ship prefix "RMAS" and auxiliary (A) or yard (Y) pennant numbers.

=== Royal Naval Supply and Transport Service ===
The Royal Naval Supply and Transport Service (RNSTS) was a civilian manned logistics service that supported the Royal Navy and Royal Fleet Auxiliary. The RNSTS was responsible for the maintenance, distribution and clerical oversight of all forms of stores between depot and ship.

=== Women's Royal Naval Service ===
The Women's Royal Naval Service (WRNS) and its reserve formation (Women's Royal Naval Reserve) was the women's branch of Her Majesty's Naval Service. The WRNS provided the navy with personnel for its shore establishments.

=== Royal Corps of Naval Constructors ===
The Royal Corps of Naval Constructors was an Admiralty institution for training civilians in naval architecture, marine, electrical and weapon engineering. The corps's members who did not hold commissions were eligible to wear a uniform similar to that of the Royal Navy and are accorded the same respect as commissioned officers.

=== Queen Alexandra's Royal Naval Nursing Service ===
Queen Alexandra's Royal Naval Nursing Service (QARNNS) and its reserve formation (Queen Alexandra's Royal Naval Nursing Service Reserve) was the nursing branch of Her Majesty's Naval Service. The service worked alongside the Royal Navy Medical Branch and provided nurses for the naval service's hospitals, aid stations and ships.

=== Other units ===
- Naval Party 1002, a mixed Royal Navy – Royal Marines unit, was based on Diego Garcia, British Indian Ocean Territory, to support United States Navy and United States Air Force installations on the island.
- Naval Party 1022 was based at Sembawang, Singapore, as part of the UK's commitments to the Five Power Defence Arrangements.
