= List of mine countermeasure vessels of the Royal Navy =

== Active ships (as of 2026) ==
- Hunt-class mine countermeasures vessels
  - HMS Ledbury (M30)
  - HMS Cattistock (M31)
  - HMS Brocklesby (M33)
  - HMS Middleton (M34)
  - HMS Hurworth (M39)
- Sandown-class minehunter
  - HMS Bangor (M109)
- HMS Stirling Castle (M01) autonomous mine countermeasures "mother ship"
- Arcims-class autonomous vessels
  - RNMB Hebe
  - RNMB Hydra
  - RNMB Hussar
  - RNMB Hazard
  - RNMB Harrier
  - RNMB Halcyon
  - RNMB Hellcat
- Thales autonomous vessels
  - RNMB Apollo
  - RNMB Abdiel
  - RNMB Ariadne
  - RNMB Adventure

== Historical ships ==
Naval mine clearance was originally done by whatever type of vessel could easily be adapted to the task, paddle steamers proving particularly suited due to their shallow draught. In both World Wars naval trawlers were used, as they were naturally suitable for wire sweeping. In World War II this task was given to smaller trawlers of about 300 tons, larger ones being used for anti-submarine work. The increased sophistication and threat posed by the mine meant that specialist mine countermeasure vessels eventually had to be built: the Minesweeping Sloop. This term was officially dropped in 1937, but remained in use nonetheless. The Royal Navy has possessed such vessels since 1914.

There were also some conversions of ships originally built for other purposes for special minesweeping. This was mainly early in World War II for sweeping acoustic and magnetic mines, and later in the war for sweeping influence mines. The ships selected were of varying origin and age and thus do not form a class as such.

- Flower-class sloop (112 ships in 4 sub-classes, launched 1914–1918) convoy sloops intended originally for minesweeping
- Hunt class, Belvoir group (20 ships, launched 1916–17) Ailsa twin-screw coastal minesweeping sloops
- Hunt class, Aberdare group (87 ships, launched 1917–1919) Admiralty twin-screw coastal minesweeping sloops
- Dance-class minesweeper (14 ships, launched 1917–1919) tunnel-screw coastal minesweeping sloops
- Racecourse-class minesweeper (32 ships in 2 sub-classes, launched 1916–1918) paddlewheel coastal minesweeping sloops
- Halcyon-class minesweeper (7 reciprocating and 14 turbine ships, launched 1933–1939) twin-screw minesweeping sloops
- Bangor-class minesweeper (14 ships, launched 1940–1942) diesel twin-screw single-role minesweeping sloops
- Blyth class (Bangor class II) (19 ships, launched 1940–1943) reciprocating Bangor variant
- Ardrossan class (Bangor class III) (26 ships, launched 1940–1942) turbine Bangor variant
- Bathurst-class corvette (47 ships, launched 1940–1943 only served with the Royal Australian Navy and Royal Indian Navy) Australian Bangor variant
- MMS-class minesweeper (403 ships, launched 1940–1945) inshore acoustic / magnetic motor minesweepers
- Algerine-class minesweeper (98 ships, launched 1941–1945) twin-screw multi-role minesweeping sloops
- Catherine-class minesweeper (22 ships, twin-screw multi-role minesweeping sloops, transferred from the US Navy in 1941 under the Lend-Lease program)
- BYMS-class minesweeper (150 ships, launched 1941–1943) British-built acoustic / magnetic motor minesweepers
- Cybele class (2 ships, launched 1943) towed pressure-mine detonating vessels
- Ton-class minesweeper (116 ships, launched 1952–1959) open-water minesweepers, minehunters and mine countermeasures vessels
- Ham-class minesweeper (93 ships, launched 1954–1959) inshore minesweepers
- Ley-class minehunter (10 ships, launched 1952–1955) inshore minehunters
- Wilton-class minesweeper/minehunter (1 ship, launched 18 January 1972) open-water minesweeper and minehunter. Prototype ship built of glass reinforced plastic (GRP) to same hull design as Ton class. Forerunner of the Hunt and Sandown classes, also built of GRP.
- Hunt-class mine countermeasures vessel (13 ships, launched 1978–1988) mine countermeasures vessels
- Venturer-class minesweeper (2 ships, bought 1979) deep-water single-role minesweepers
- River-class minesweeper (12 ships, launched 1982–1985) deep-water single-role minesweepers
- Sandown-class minehunter (12 ships, launched 1990–2001) single-role minehunters

== See also ==
- Trawlers of the Royal Navy
- Auxiliary Patrol
- Royal Naval Patrol Service
