= Berkeley Hunt =

Foxhound pack in England

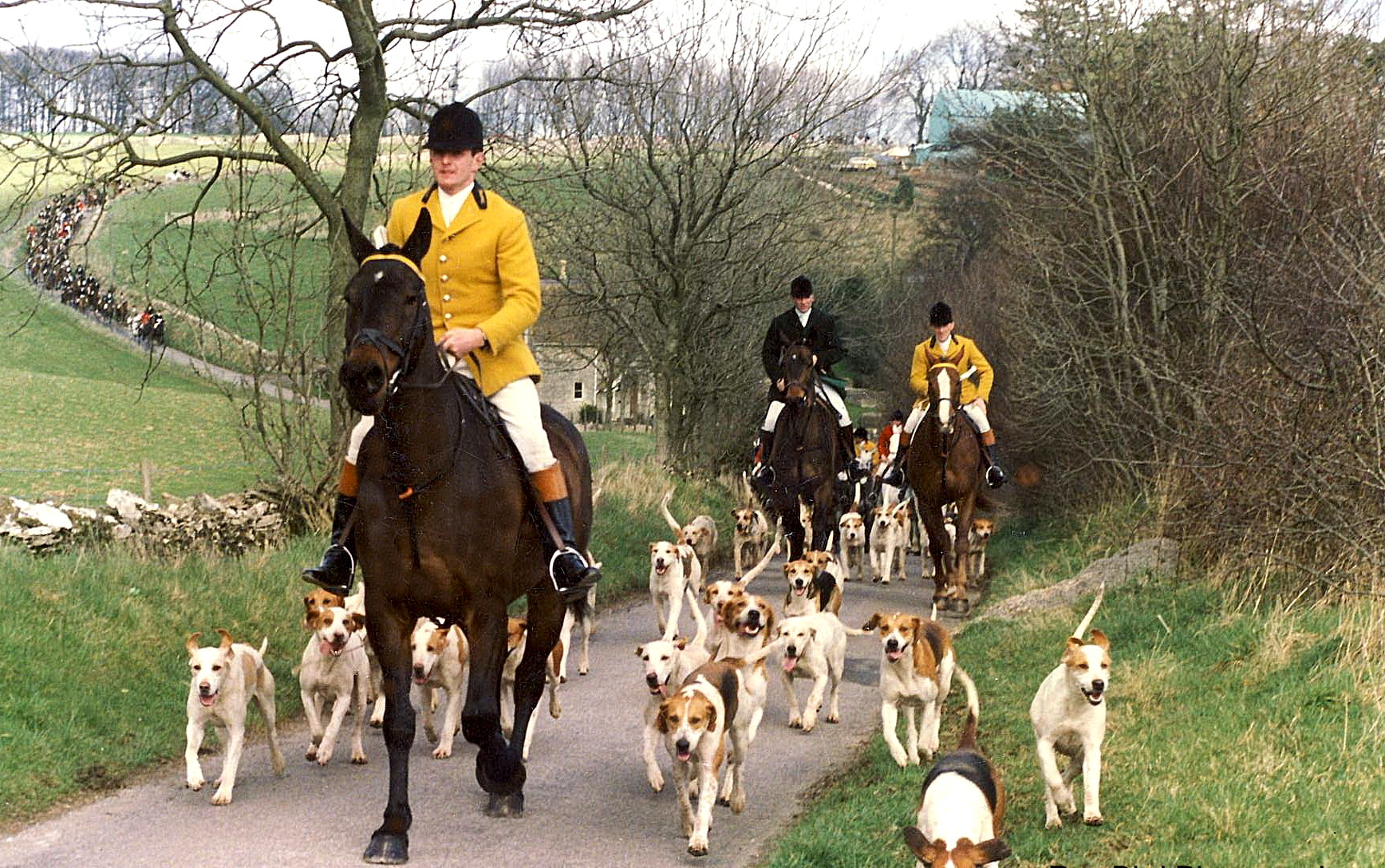
- Berkeley Hunt in 1988
- Hunt type: Fox hunting
- Country: England

History
- Founded: 12th century (foxes from 18th century)
- Founded by: Berkeley family
- Historical quarry: Stag and buck

Hunt information
- Hound breed: Foxhound
- Hunt country: Gloucestershire & South Gloucestershire
- Master(s): Henry Berkeley
- Quarry: Fox
- Website: www.berkeleyhunt.co.uk

The Berkeley Hunt is a foxhound pack based in the western region of England. Its country lies in the southern part of Gloucestershire, specifically between the cities of Gloucester and Bristol.

== History ==
Hunt coat of the Berkeley Hunt: Yellow with green collar with silver foxes courant embroidered on collar. 5 gold buttons, as worn by professional huntsman and "amateur huntsman" (i.e. a Master of Foxhounds who hunts his own hounds)

The Berkeley Hunt is said to have been one of the largest and most important in the world at its time in 18th century. Hounds have been kept at Berkeley Castle since the 12th century, initially to hunt the stag and the buck, and since the 18th century, to hunt the fox. The Berkeley family of Berkeley Castle (who lost their titles of Baron Berkeley and Earl of Berkeley in 1882 and 1942 respectively) still owns the Berkeley hounds and the kennels.

== Country ==
The "hill country" above Dursley and Wotton-under-Edge is mainly hunted in March and early April, and is adjacent to the estate of the Duke of Beaufort. The "vale country" includes the Vale of Berkeley, largely dairy and cattle farms with much permanent pasture, although the use of this land for arable farming is increasing.

== Relationship with the Old Berkeley Hunt and Cotswold Hunt ==
At one time the hounds of the Berkeley Hunt were kennelled at Berkeley and at Cheltenham, Nettlebed, Gerrards Cross and Cranford, Middlesex. It should have been possible to hunt from Berkeley Castle to Wormwood Scrubs, 100 miles as the crow flies, although not on a regular basis without disturbing other hunts. This extensive activity may have begun with the Berkeleys taking their hounds to London each year. In the late 18th century, the fifth Earl of Berkeley lost most of his land in and around Middlesex.

The country around Cheltenham and Broadway became Cotswold, North Cotswold and Cotswold Vale Farmer's Hunt. Gerrards Cross and Cranford retained the old livery and became known as the Old Berkeley Hunt. They were later divided into East and West.

== After the Hunting Act ==
Although "hunting wild mammals with a dog" was made illegal in England and Wales by the Hunting Act 2004, which came into force in 2005, a number of exemptions listed in Schedule 1 of the 2004 Act allow some previously unusual forms of hunting wild mammals with dogs to continue, such as "hunting... for the purpose of enabling a bird of prey to hunt the wild mammal".

The hunt continues to meet regularly and on special occasions such as the Boxing Day parade and hunt in Thornbury. Despite the threat of further legislation, this continued in 2024.

== Lending a name ==
The Old Berkeley Hunt developed a large following among the prosperous London middle classes:

- The slang term "berk" is a contraction of "Berkeley Hunt", which in turn refers to the English vulgarity "cunt" (the usage is dated to the 1930s). It is an example of Cockney rhyming slang. The "berk" in Berkeley is pronounced /ˈbɑːk/, but in Cockney it is pronounced /ˈbɜːk/, similar to American English (but non-rhotic).
- The Hunt-class mine countermeasure vessel HMS Berkeley was named after the hunt.
- Berkeley Square in London is named after the family. Berkeley House in Piccadilly was sold in 1696 to the Duke of Devonshire, who demolished it to build Devonshire House.
