= HMS Brocklesby =

Three ships of the Royal Navy have been named HMS Brocklesby after the Brocklesby hunt:

- The first, HMS Brocklesby (1916), commissioned in 1916, was an ex-coaster taken up from trade. She served in World War I and was paid off in 1917.
- The second, HMS Brocklesby (L42), launched in 1940, was a Hunt-class destroyer that served in World War II.
- The third, HMS Brocklesby (M33), launched in 1982, is a Hunt-class mine countermeasures vessel

== Battle honours ==
- Dieppe 1942
- English Channel 1942–43
- Atlantic 1943
- Sicily 1943
- Salerno 1943
- Adriatic 1944
- Al Faw 2003

== See also ==
- PS Brocklesby, a paddle steamer
- Brocklesby (disambiguation)
