= HMS Brocklesby (M33) =

1983 Hunt-class mine countermeasures vessel of the Royal Navy

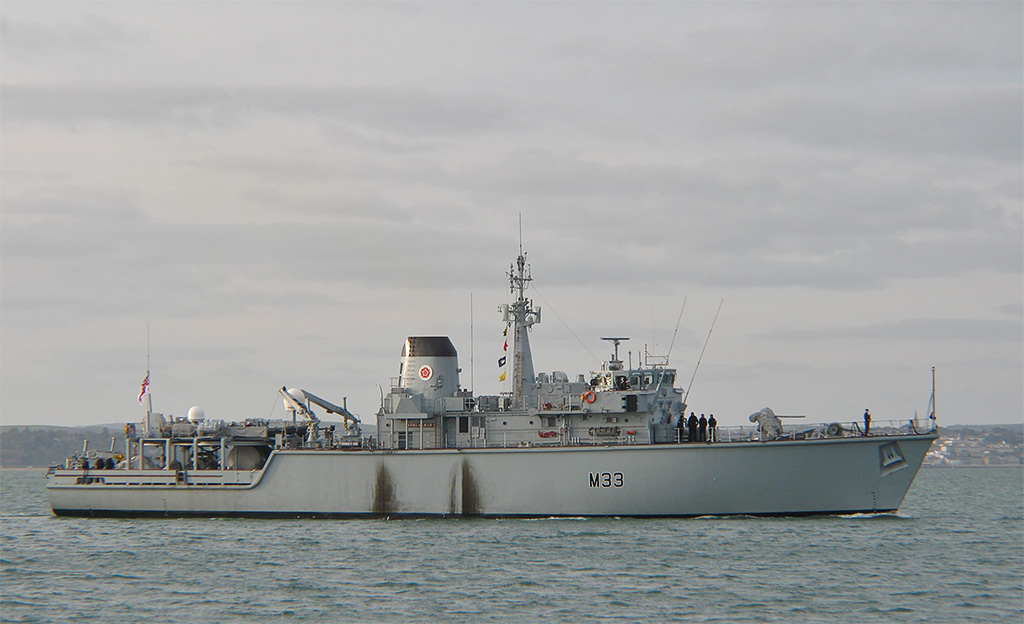
- HMS Brocklesby in Portsmouth, October 2008

History

United Kingdom
- Name: HMS Brocklesby
- Builder: Vosper Thornycroft
- Launched: 12 January 1982
- Sponsored by: Viscountess Trenchard, the wife of Viscount Trenchard MC, then Minister of State for Defence Procurement
- Completed: 25 October 1982
- Commissioned: 3 February 1983
- Home port: Portsmouth
- Identification: IMO number: 4906616; MMSI number: 234577000; Callsign: GBPQ; Pennant number: M33
- Honours and awards: Al Faw – 2003
- Status: In active service
- Badge

General characteristics
- Class & type: Hunt-class mine countermeasures vessel
- Displacement: 750 t (740 long tons)
- Length: 60 m (196 ft 10 in)
- Beam: 9.8 m (32 ft 2 in)
- Draught: 2.2 m (7 ft 3 in)
- Propulsion: 2 × Caterpillar C32, 2 × FPP – 757 kW (1,015 hp)
- Speed: 15 knots (28 km/h; 17 mph)
- Boats & landing craft carried: 2 × MIB diving support boats
- Complement: 45 (6 officers & 39 ratings)
- Sensors & processing systems: Sonar Type 2193
- Electronic warfare & decoys: SeaFox mine disposal system; Diver-placed explosive charges
- Armament: 1 × 30mm DS30B S30GM1; 3 × Miniguns (may be retired as of 2023); 2 × .50 cal HMG

HMS Brocklesby is a Hunt-class mine countermeasures vessel of the British Royal Navy, her primary purpose is to find and neutralise sea mines using a combination of; Sonar, Mine Clearance Divers and the Seafox remotely operated vehicle (ROV). The class are the largest warships of glass-reinforced plastic (GRP) construction, which gives the vessels a low magnetic signature. In addition to her mine countermeasures activities, Brocklesby acts as an offshore patrol vessel, undertaking coastal patrol and fisheries protection duties.

From 2018 to 2021 Brocklesby was deployed in Bahrain at HMS Jufair as part of four minehunters of 9th Mine Countermeasures Squadron supported by a Royal Fleet Auxiliary Bay-class landing ship on Operation Kipion.

== Operational history ==
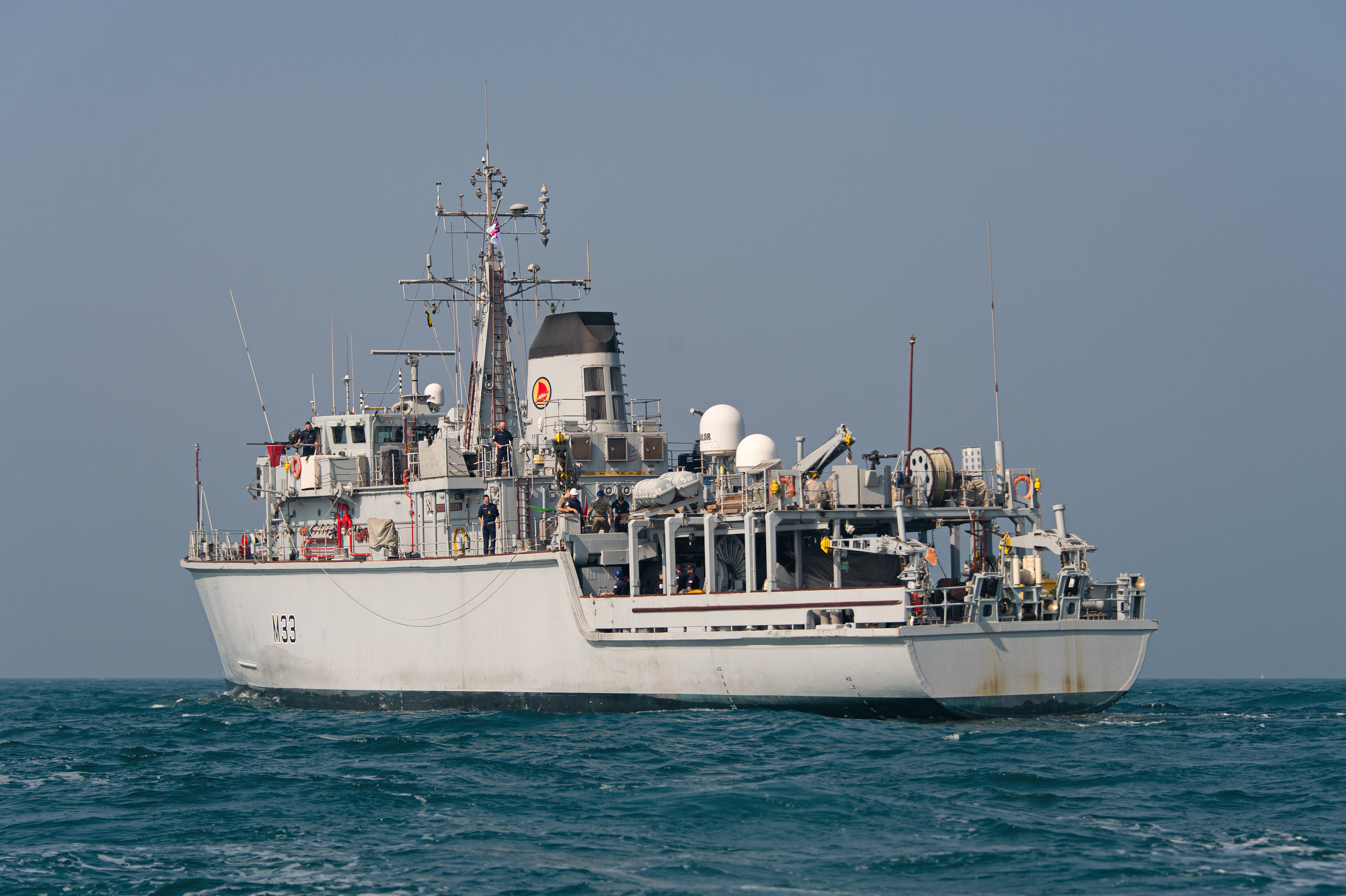
Stern view of Brocklesby off Bahrain in 2021

=== Cherbourg incident ===
In 1993 she became involved in the Cherbourg incident, when Brocklesby challenged the French trawler La Calypso in the Channel Islands waters.

=== 2003 Invasion of Iraq ===
She gained a battle honour when she was among the first coalition ships into Umm Qasr during the 2003 invasion of Iraq. She was part of a group of mine countermeasure vessels that cleared a mined channel into the port, enabling access to it by sea.

=== 2011 Libya operations ===
In 2011 she took part in surveillance and embargo operations off the coast of Libya alongside HMS Liverpool, as part of Operation Ellamy, the UK's contribution to Operation Unified Protector. In early May 2011, she took part in a mine-clearing operation to secure the waters of Misrata Port, Libya, after mines were dropped by Muammar Gaddafi's forces to prevent aid from being delivered to the besieged city. Brocklesby used her sonar and SeaFox mine disposal system to locate and destroy a mine that was located 1.6 kilometres (0.99 mi) from the harbour entrance, making the waters safe for aid ships to enter.

Brocklesby's commanding officer, Lieutenant Commander Jim Byron DSC, said:

The Royal Navy has always had a great reputation for mine clearance and it is precisely this type of operation that shows the world just how good we are. We are extremely proud that we could use our skills and knowledge to open that port and allow humanitarian aid back into Libya where it is so desperately needed. Without this capability there could have been hundreds of lives lost through the detonation of that mine.

— Captain Byron, Royal Navy interview

Brocklesby returned to Portsmouth on 5 July 2011 flying a special version of the Jolly Roger, indicating the successful destruction of a sea-mine.

=== Exercise Joint Warrior 2013 ===
In October 2013 she participated in Exercise Joint Warrior.

=== Operation Kipion 2018–2021 ===
During 2018 Brocklesby departed the UK's waters and transited to the Middle East as part of the British commitment to promoting stability in the region. Operation Kipion saw four British minehunters, as well as other warships, spend approximately three years forward deployed. The squadron is capable of operating both independently and as part of a larger multinational force to ensure the safe flow of oil and trade from the Middle East. Brocklesby's move to the Middle East saw her take responsibility from HMS Middleton, subsequently allowing Middleton to transit back to the UK. In August 2021, Middleton returned to the Gulf to again relieve Brocklesby which redeployed back to the U.K.

The ship began a prolonged refit in early 2023 and was initially expected to return to active service in early 2026.
