= HMS Chilcompton =

Minesweeper of the Royal Navy

History

United Kingdom
- Name: HMS Chilcompton
- Builder: Herd & Mckenzie
- Launched: 23 October 1953
- Identification: Pennant number: M1122
- Fate: Sold on 26 November 1971

General characteristics
- Class & type: Ton-class minesweeper
- Displacement: 440 long tons (450 t)
- Length: 153 ft (46.6 m)
- Beam: 28.9 ft (8.8 m)
- Draught: 8.2 ft (2.5 m)
- Propulsion: 2 × Paxman Deltic 18A-7A diesel engines at 3,000 bhp (2,200 kW)
- Speed: Cruise 13 knots (24 km/h) on one engine. Max 16 knots (30 km/h) on both
- Range: 2,500 nautical miles (4,600 km) at 12 knots (22 km/h)
- Complement: 32
- Armament: 1 x Bofors 40 mm gun

HMS Chilcompton was a Ton-class minesweeper of the Royal Navy built by Herd & Mckenzie and launched on 23 October 1953. She had the pennant number of a minesweeper - M1122.

Chilcompton spent the first eight years of her life in the Operational Reserve fleet at Hythe before joining the 9th MSS in the Persian Gulf in May 1962, serving there until September 1965. The ship formed part of the Fishery Protection Squadron from April 1967 to January 1969. She was sold on 26 November 1971.
