= United Kingdom Naval Support Facility =

British naval base in north-east Bahrain

- Mina Salman Port, Juffair, Manama in Bahrain
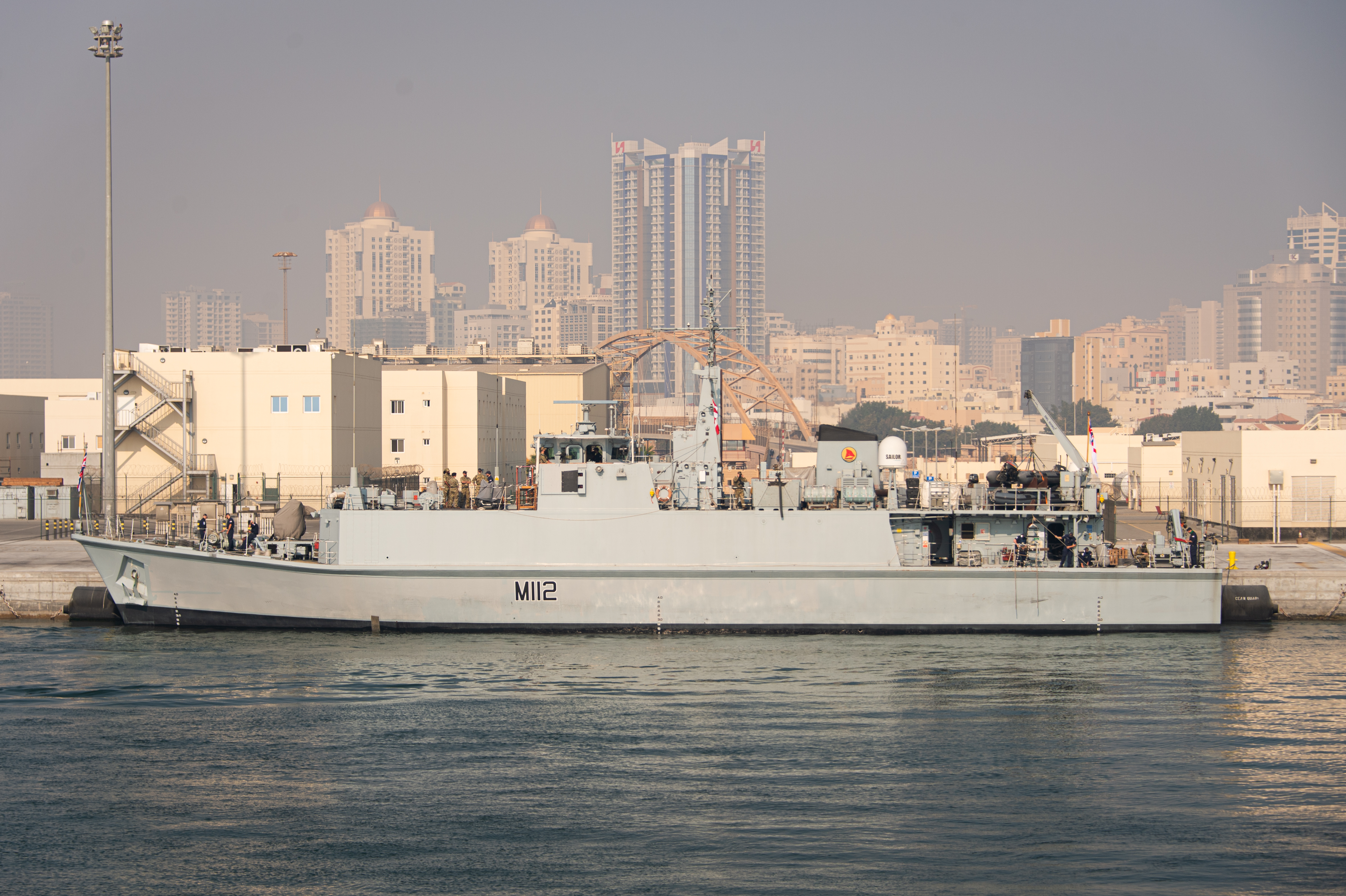
- HMS Shoreham alongside in Bahrain whilst deployed on Operation Kipion

Site information
- Type: Naval support facility
- Operator: Royal Navy
- Condition: Operational

Location
- Location in Bahrain
- Coordinates: 26°12′20″N 50°36′55″E
- Area: 10 acres (40,000 square metres)

Site history
- Built: 1934; 92 years ago
- In use: 1934–1971; 2018–present
- Events: Operation Kipion

Garrison information
- Garrison: UK Maritime Component Command
- Occupants: 9th Mine Counter-Measures Squadron

The United Kingdom Naval Support Facility (UKNSF) is a Royal Navy (RN) base established in Bahrain on 13 April 1935, originally known as HMS Jufair, as part of the port at Mina Salman. In 1950, the United States Navy (USN) leased space in HMS Jufair, and following Bahraini independence in 1971, took over the base. On 6 December 2014, it was announced that HMS Jufair would be reestablished as a permanent Royal Navy base. On 5 April 2018, the UK Naval Support Facility was officially opened by the Crown Prince of Bahrain, Salman bin Hamad Al Khalifa and The Duke of York, representing the United Kingdom.

== History ==
=== Establishment ===
The first presence of the Royal Navy in the Persian Gulf came about from the need to control pirates raiding the British Empire ships east of the Gulf of Suez, especially the East India Company routes to India. In the early 1820s the rulers of Bahrain, Salman and Abdullah Al Khalifa, signed an agreement to try and limit piracy in the area. This was strengthened in 1835 through an agreement signed specifically with the Royal Navy, which addressed the need to stop pirates operating in the area, and limit the slave trade. In 1902, the first oil was discovered in the area, but commercial extraction did not begin until 1925, when Frank Holmes was given the first license, with the first oil not exported from Bahrain until 1932.

=== HMS Jufair ===
HMS Jufair badge.

After the death of Sheikh Isa in 1932, having handed control of the state in 1921 under British diplomatic pressure to his son Hamad, his advisor Charles Belgrave, with whom he had modernised the state systems and key infrastructure, suggested that they should come to an agreement with the British to open a permanent Royal Navy base within the state. HMS Jufair opened on 13 April 1935; 91 years ago, as part of the port at Mina Salman. During World War II, it was bombed by the Royal Italian Air Force as part of an Axis Forces effort to cut off one of the three Allied Forces sources of oil in the Persian Gulf.

=== Transfer to United States Navy ===
As a result of the Italian raid, and the United States entry into World War II from December 1941, the Royal Navy extended an invitation to the United States Navy (USN), allowing the USN to deploy a small detachment. Post-World War II, the posting was recognised as the U.S. Middle East Force from 1948, a small shore facility that provided logistical and communications support to Marine Expeditionary vessels.

In 1971, with Bahrain gaining independence from the United Kingdom, the permanent Royal Navy presence in Bahrain ended. With agreement of the Emir, the USN immediately took on the entire 10 acres (40,000 square metres) site, and eight years later the base was named Administrative Support Unit (ASU) Bahrain. In 1992, the title was slightly modified to Administrative Support Unit Southwest Asia to better reflect its regional role. In 1995, the United States Fifth Fleet was formed with its headquarters at ASU Bahrain. By 2000, the base had again been renamed; as Naval Support Activity Bahrain, abbreviated NSA Bahrain.

== Reestablishment ==
In December 2014, it was announced that the Royal Navy would be re-opening a permanent naval base east of Suez at Mina Salman Port to be called HMS Juffair or Mina Salman Support Facility, with construction starting during October 2015. Armed Forces Minister Penny Mordaunt confirmed that while the aircraft carriers would be able to access facilities while at anchor in the vicinity of the Mina Salman port, they would not be able to berth directly alongside the support facility itself due to draught constraints. On 5 April 2018, the United Kingdom Naval Support Facility (UKNSF) was officially opened by Bahraini Crown Prince Salman bin Hamad Al Khalifa and Britain's Prince Andrew. The new facility can accommodate up to 500 Royal Navy personnel.

The base is located in an area of Manama (the capital of Bahrain) that is now officially called Juffair (Arabic: الجفير) in the Latin alphabet by the Bahrain government.

== Deployed vessels ==
As of early 2026, with the withdrawal of HMS Middleton (the last crewed Royal Navy vessel assigned to the region), HMS Jufair has not had any vessels permanently assigned to the base. In the past, UKNSF has been the home port for ships deployed as part of Operation Kipion, which has been the UK's primary military effort in support of peacekeeping and maritime security in the Gulf region, as well as ensuring the safe flow of oil and trade. In addition to ships deployed to the region as part of other deployments, until 2025/26 there were a number of vessels permanently stationed in Bahrain to undertake various tasks. However, these were all withdrawn by early 2026.

Trials have taken place in the Gulf employing autonomous mine countermeasures vessels. In February 2023, the autonomous minehunting vessel RNMB Harrier arrived in Bahrain to begin trials of autonomous systems in hot weather. The autonomous vessel operated from RFA Cardigan Bay. However, in 2024 Cardigan Bay returned to the UK for refit without being replaced. Two other mine countermeasures vessels were also withdrawn. In 2025 the minehunter HMS Bangor was also returned to the U.K., with HMS Middleton following in 2026.

The presence of a general-purpose frigate in the Gulf was also being terminated as of the end of 2025, with the planned decommissioning of HMS Lancaster and lack of clarity as to whether/how she would be replaced.

Initially, the quayside at UKNSF was only accessible to the small mine countermeasures vessels assigned to the base, with larger ships having to be moored at other piers within the Mina Salman port area. In June 2020, a refurbishment of the quay meant that larger vessels, including Type 23 frigates and Type 45 destroyers would be able to utilise the mooring facilities within the UK base itself. The shallow draft of the port continued to preclude very large vessels, such as the Royal Navy's Queen Elizabeth-class aircraft carriers, to be able to use the facility itself.
