= Brocklesby (disambiguation) =

Brocklesby is a village in Lincolnshire, England.

Brocklesby may also refer to:

== Places ==
- Brocklesby, New South Wales, a town in the Riverina region of south west New South Wales, Australia.

== People ==
- Richard Brocklesby (priest) (1636–1714), English non-abjuring priest
- Richard Brocklesby (1722–1797), English physician
- Hubert 'Bert' Brocklesby, one of the Richmond Sixteen

== Other ==
- 1940 Brocklesby mid-air collision, occurred over Brocklesby, New South Wales, Australia
- Brocklesby railway station, a station in Brocklesby, Lincolnshire
- Brocklesby Stakes, a British horse race
- HMS Brocklesby, several Royal Navy ships named HMS Brocklesby
- PS Brocklesby, a paddle steamer
