= Operation Kipion =

Ongoing peacetime deployment of the Royal Navy and Royal Air Force

Location	Persian Gulf & Indian Ocean
Status	Ongoing

Belligerents
- United Kingdom

Commanders and leaders
- (United Kingdom) Keir Starmer (United Kingdom) John Healey (United Kingdom) Commodore Adrian C Fryer (as UK Maritime Component Commander) (United Kingdom) Air Commodore Nikki Thomas OBE (as UK Air Component Commander)

Operation Kipion has been a long-standing air and maritime presence by the United Kingdom in the Persian Gulf and Indian Ocean to promote enduring peace and stability in the region, and ensure the safe flow of oil and trade. Up until the early 2020s, a permanent presence of 4 minesweepers formed the Mine Countermeasures element (9 Mine Countermeasures Squadron) of this tasking. With the return of all crewed minehunters to the U.K., and their planned eventual replacement with autonomous minehunting systems, the configuration of 9 Mine Countermeasures Squadron had been expected to change. Nevertheless, as of the end of 2025, it was reported that both remaining minehunters in the Gulf would be withdrawn; a move completed with the withdrawal of HMS Middleton in early 2026. Whether they would be replaced with autonomous capabilities in the near-term was unclear.

The Royal Air Force operations in the broader Middle East have also fallen under this operation.

== Royal Navy ==
Historical:

- HMS Daring with a AgustaWestland Wildcat HMA2 from 815 Naval Air Squadron (815 NAS) on board - (September 2016 - April 2017)
- HMS Dauntless with a Westland Lynx HMA.8 from 815 Naval Air Squadron (815 NAS) on board - (January 2015 - June 2015)
- HMS Dragon with a AgustaWestland Wildcat HMA2 from 815 Naval Air Squadron (815 NAS) on board - (September 2018 - April 2019)
- HMS Defender with a Westland Lynx HMA.8 from 815 Naval Air Squadron (815 NAS) on board - (October 2014 - December 2014) and (December 2015 and July 2016). With a AgustaWestland Wildcat HMA2 from 815 Naval Air Squadron (815 NAS) on board - (August 2019 - March 2020)
- HMS Duncan with a Westland Lynx HMA.8 from 815 Naval Air Squadron (815 NAS) on board - (March 2015 - December 2015). With a AgustaWestland Wildcat HMA2 from 815 Naval Air Squadron (815 NAS) on board - (July 2019 - August 2019)
- HMS Monmouth with a AgustaWestland Wildcat HMA2 from 815 Naval Air Squadron (815 NAS) on board - (March 2017 - December 2017)
- HMS Kent with a AgustaWestland Wildcat HMA2 from 815 Naval Air Squadron (815 NAS) on board - (August 2019 - December 2019)
- RFA Wave Knight with a AgustaWestland Wildcat AH1 from 847 Naval Air Squadron (847 NAS) on board - (August 2019 - February 2020)
- HMS Argyll with a AgustaWestland Wildcat HMA2 from 815 Naval Air Squadron (815 NAS) on board - (March 2020 - September 2020)
- RFA Cardigan Bay with a Westland Wildcat HMA2 from 815 Naval Air Squadron (815 NAS) on board - (June 2017 - May 2021)
- HMS Montrose with a AgustaWestland Wildcat HMA2 from 815 Naval Air Squadron (815 NAS) on board - (April 2019 – November 2022)
- RFA Lyme Bay (May 2021 – April 2022)
- HMS Diamond with a AgustaWestland Wildcat HMA2 from 815 Naval Air Squadron (815 NAS) on board - (November 2023 – June 2024)
- RFA Cardigan Bay (June 2022 – April 2024)
- HMS Chiddingfold (mid-2020 - early-2025)
- HMS Lancaster with a AgustaWestland Wildcat HMA2 from 815 Naval Air Squadron (815 NAS) on board - (December 2022 – December 2025)
- HMS Bangor (mid-2021 - 2025; damaged by collision, January 2024 and effectively out of service; returned to the U.K. for refit as of end 2025)
- HMS Middleton (mid-2021 - 2026)

== Royal Air Force ==
Al Udeid Air Base, Qatar - 901 Expeditionary Air Wing RAF

RAFO Musannah, Oman - 902 Expeditionary Air Wing RAF

Al Minhad Air Base, UAE - 906 Expeditionary Air Wing RAF

== See also ==
- Standing Royal Navy deployments
