= HMS Berkeley (M40) =

British, later Greek, naval vessel

History

United Kingdom
- Name: HMS Berkeley
- Namesake: Berkeley Hunt
- Builder: Vosper Thornycroft
- Yard number: 4256
- Launched: 3 December 1986
- Acquired: 20 November 1987
- Commissioned: 14 January 1988
- Decommissioned: 28 February 2001
- Identification: Pennant number: M40
- Fate: Sold to Greece

Greece
- Name: Kallisto (Greek: Ν/ΘΗ Καλλιστώ)
- Namesake: Kallisto
- Commissioned: 28 February 2001
- Out of service: 27 October 2020
- Identification: Pennant number: M63
- Status: Wreck

General characteristics
- Class & type: Hunt-class mine countermeasures vessel
- Displacement: 750 t (740 long tons; 830 short tons)
- Length: 60 m (196 ft 10 in)
- Beam: 9.8 m (32 ft 2 in)
- Draught: 2.2 m (7 ft 3 in)
- Propulsion: 2 shaft Napier Deltic diesel engines, 3,540 shp (2,640 kW)
- Speed: 17 knots (31 km/h; 20 mph)
- Complement: 45 (6 officers & 39 ratings)
- Sensors & processing systems: Sonar Type 2193
- Armament: 1 × 40 mm gun Mark 9, replaced by 1 × 30 mm MSI DS-30B gun
- Notes: Mine counter measures equipment: 2 × PAP remotely controlled submarines (ROV); MS 14 magnetic loop; Sperry MSSA acoustic generator; K8 Oropesa sweeps

HMS Berkeley was a Hunt-class mine countermeasures vessel of the British Royal Navy. She was sold to the Hellenic Navy in 2001 and was commissioned as HS Kallisto. On 27 October 2020, she was cut in two in a collision with a container ship.

== Description ==
The Hunt class was designed as being capable of both conventional minesweeping and minehunting, and following on from the success of the experimental glass-reinforced plastic (GRP)-hulled minesweeper/minehunter Wilton, were also built from GRP in order to reduce their magnetic signature, being the largest GRP-hulled ships built at the time of construction.

The Hunts were 60.0 m (196 ft 10 in) long overall and 57.0 m (187 ft 0 in) at the waterline, with a beam of 9.8 m (32 ft 2 in) and a draught of 2.2 m (7 ft 3 in). Displacement was 625 long tons (635 t) normal and 725 long tons (737 t) full load. As built, they were powered by two Ruston-Paxman Deltic 9-59K diesel engines rated at 1,900 brake horsepower (1,400 kW) each, which drove two propeller shafts, giving a speed of 17 knots (31 km/h; 20 mph). An additional 645 bhp (481 kW) Deltic diesel engine could be used to either drive a 525 kW (704 hp) alternator powering a magnetic sweep, or a slow-speed hydraulic drive for the propellers for use during minehunting, which could give a speed of 8 knots (15 km/h; 9.2 mph) or a bow thruster. In addition, the ships were fitted with three Foden 250 kW (340 hp) diesel alternators to generate electrical power for ship's systems.

The original design armament for the ships was a single 40 mm gun, which was later replaced by a 30 mm Oerlikon KCB cannon on a stabilised DS30 mount, with Berkeley being fitted with the DS30 by 1990. Two 20 mm Oerlikon cannon could also be fitted. For minehunting, the ships would use Type 193M sonar to locate potential mines, which could then be investigated and if necessary destroyed by two PAP-104 remotely controlled submersibles or divers. The ship also carried magnetic, acoustic or Oropesa sweeps. The ship had a crew of 45 (6 officers and 39 other ranks).

== History ==
She was the twelfth of the thirteen Hunt-class vessels, and was built as Yard No.4256 by Vosper Thorneycroft shipbuilders at Woolston, Southampton. The ship was ordered on 4 June 1985 and was laid down on 9 September 1985, and was launched on 3 December 1986 by Lady Gerken, the wife of Vice Admiral Sir Robert Gerken, former Flag Officer Plymouth.

Berkeley was commissioned on 14 January 1988, and after sea trials, was assigned to the 1st Mine Countermeasures Squadron based at Rosyth, Scotland. In 1990, she was part of the 3rd Mine Countermeasures Squadron. She took part in mine clearance operations in the Persian Gulf following the 1st Gulf War and later was involved in fishery protection duties in UK waters.

She was sold to the Hellenic Navy, then handed over and commissioned as Kallisto, after the mythological nymph of that name, on 28 February 2001.

On 27 October 2020, after sailing from Salamis Naval Base, HS Kallisto was severely damaged in a collision in the Saronic Gulf with the Portuguese-flagged container ship Maersk Launceston, which had just departed from the port of Piraeus. Kallisto was cut in two, with two of her 27 crew injured, and the stern section sank. Her bow section developed a severe list and was taken in tow for the naval base.
