= HMS Bicester (M36) =

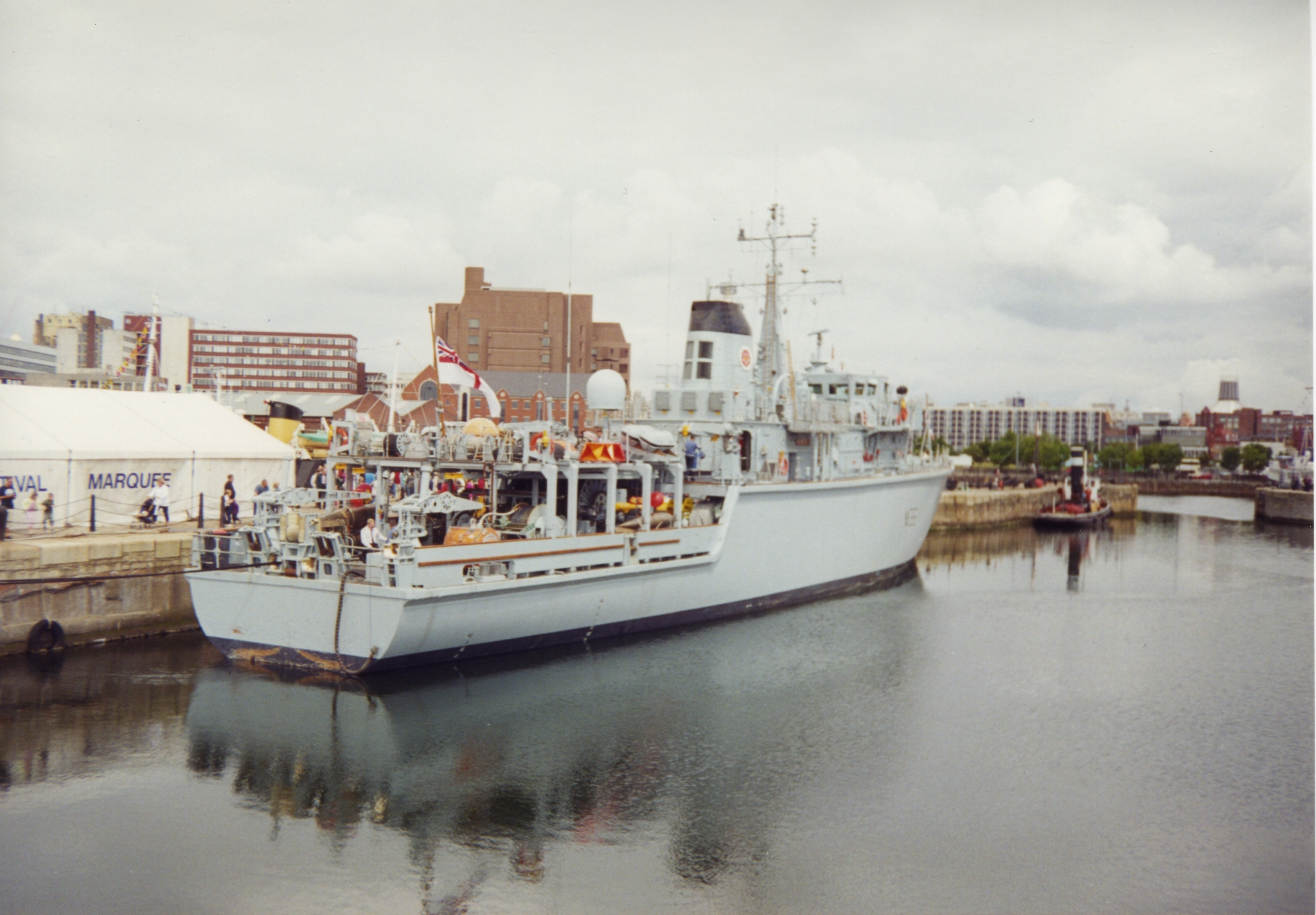

History

United Kingdom
- Name: HMS Bicester
- Operator: Royal Navy
- Builder: Vosper Thornycroft
- Launched: 4 June 1985
- Commissioned: 1988
- Decommissioned: 2000
- Identification: Pennant number: M36
- Fate: Sold to Greece, 2001

Greece
- Name: Europa; (Greek: Ν/ΘΗ Ευρώπη)
- Operator: Hellenic Navy
- Acquired: 2001
- Identification: Pennant number: M62

General characteristics
- Class & type: Hunt-class mine countermeasures vessel
- Displacement: 750 tons
- Length: 60 m (200 ft)
- Beam: 9.8 m (32 ft)
- Draught: 2.2 m (7 ft 3 in)
- Propulsion: 2 shaft Napier Deltic diesel, 3,540 shp
- Speed: 17 knots (31 km/h; 20 mph)
- Complement: 45 (6 officers & 39 ratings)
- Sensors & processing systems: Sonar Type 2193
- Armament: 30mm automatic small calibre gun; 2 × Mk44 minigun; 3 × 7.62mm general purpose machine guns; Mine counter measures equipment: SeaFox mine disposal system; Diver-placed explosive charges

HMS Bicester was a Hunt-class mine countermeasures vessel of the Royal Navy. She was sold to the Greek Navy in 2001 as HS Europa.
