= HMS Brecon (M29) =

Hunt-class mine countermeasures vessel

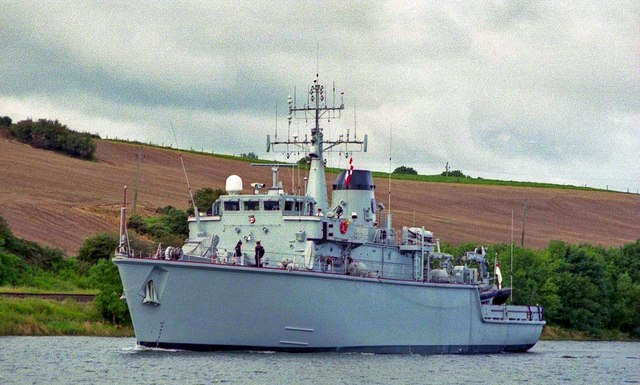
- HMS Brecon

History

United Kingdom
- Name: HMS Brecon
- Builder: Vosper Thornycroft
- Launched: 1978
- Commissioned: 18 December 1979
- Decommissioned: 19 July 2005
- Identification: Pennant number: M29
- Status: Training ship

General characteristics
- Class & type: Hunt-class mine countermeasures vessel
- Displacement: 750 t (740 long tons; 830 short tons)
- Length: 60 m (196 ft 10 in)
- Beam: 9.8 m (32 ft 2 in)
- Draught: 2.2 m (7 ft 3 in)
- Propulsion: 2 shaft Napier Deltic diesel, 3,540 shp (2,640 kW)
- Speed: 17 kn (31 km/h; 20 mph)
- Complement: 45 (6 officers & 39 ratings)
- Sensors & processing systems: Sonar Type 2193
- Electronic warfare & decoys: SeaFox mine disposal system; Diver-placed explosive charges
- Armament: 1 × 30mm DS30M Mk2 gun; 2 × Miniguns; 3 × General purpose machine guns

HMS Brecon is a Hunt-class mine countermeasures vessel that served with the Royal Navy in the mine warfare role and since 2008 is employed as a non-commissioned static training ship at HMS Raleigh. Her pennant number was M29.

== Service ==
Brecon was built at Vosper Thornycroft, the lead yard for the Hunt class. She was launched by the Duchess of Kent and commissioned on 18 December 1979. She saw service in the aftermath of the Falklands War (1982) and the Gulf War of 1991. In 1998 she was assigned to the Northern Ireland Squadron. She acted as guardship to the tall ships race when it visited Greenock in 1999.

Brecon was the first Royal Navy vessel to be commanded by a woman. Lieutenant Charlotte "Charlie" Atkinson became her commanding officer in January 2004. Atkinson was the only woman among the 45-strong crew of the ship. Her historic appointment came 14 years after the Royal Navy first began admitting female officers on equal terms with men.

Brecon's assignment to the Northern Ireland Squadron required modifications from her traditional minesweeping duties to become a fully capable patrol platform. This included the addition of rigid-hulled inflatable boats and embarkation of a 10-strong Royal Marine boarding team.

=== Decommissioning and new role ===
Brecon was scheduled to be decommissioned following defence cuts announced in 2004 by the British Ministry of Defence. The ship's company held a last divisions and decommissioning ceremony on 19 July 2005.

Since February 2008, Brecon has been employed as a hulk at Jupiter Point’s HMS Raleigh, where she is utilised to provide new recruits with their first taste of life afloat, albeit she is no longer in commission.
