= HMS Quorn (M41) =

British mine countermeasures ship (1989–2017)

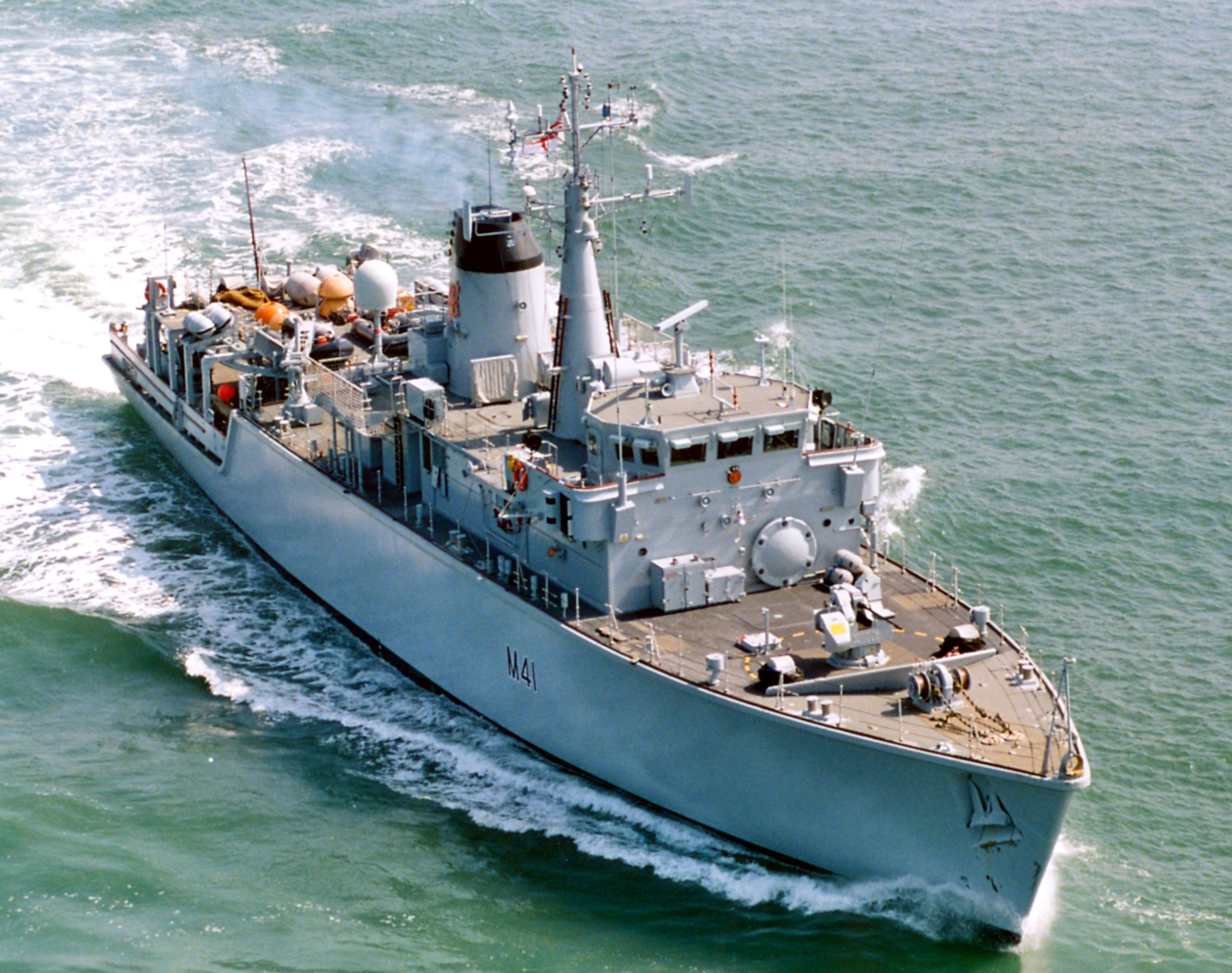
- HMS Quorn in 2001

History

United Kingdom
- Name: HMS Quorn
- Operator: Royal Navy
- Builder: Vosper Thornycroft
- Launched: 23 January 1988
- Sponsored by: Lady Rosemary Thompson
- Commissioned: 1989
- Decommissioned: 14 December 2017
- Identification: IMO number: 4906692; MMSI number: 234628000; Pennant number: M41
- Fate: Sold to Lithuania April 2020

General characteristics
- Class & type: Hunt-class mine countermeasures vessel
- Displacement: 750 t (740 long tons; 830 short tons)
- Length: 60 m (196 ft 10 in)
- Beam: 9.8 m (32 ft 2 in)
- Draught: 2.2 m (7 ft 3 in)
- Propulsion: 2 shaft Napier Deltic diesel, 3,540 shp
- Speed: 17 kn (31 km/h; 20 mph)
- Complement: 45 (6 officers & 39 ratings)
- Sensors & processing systems: Sonar Type 2193
- Electronic warfare & decoys: SeaFox mine disposal system; Diver-placed explosive charges
- Armament: 1 × 30mm DS30M Mk2 gun; 2 × Miniguns; 3 × General purpose machine guns

HMS Quorn, the third ship of this name, was a Hunt-class mine countermeasures vessel of the Royal Navy. She was launched on 23 January 1988, as the last ship of her class. She was decommissioned in 2017. After decommissioning from Royal Navy, she was sold to Lithuania who renamed her M55 Sūduvis.

== Operational history ==
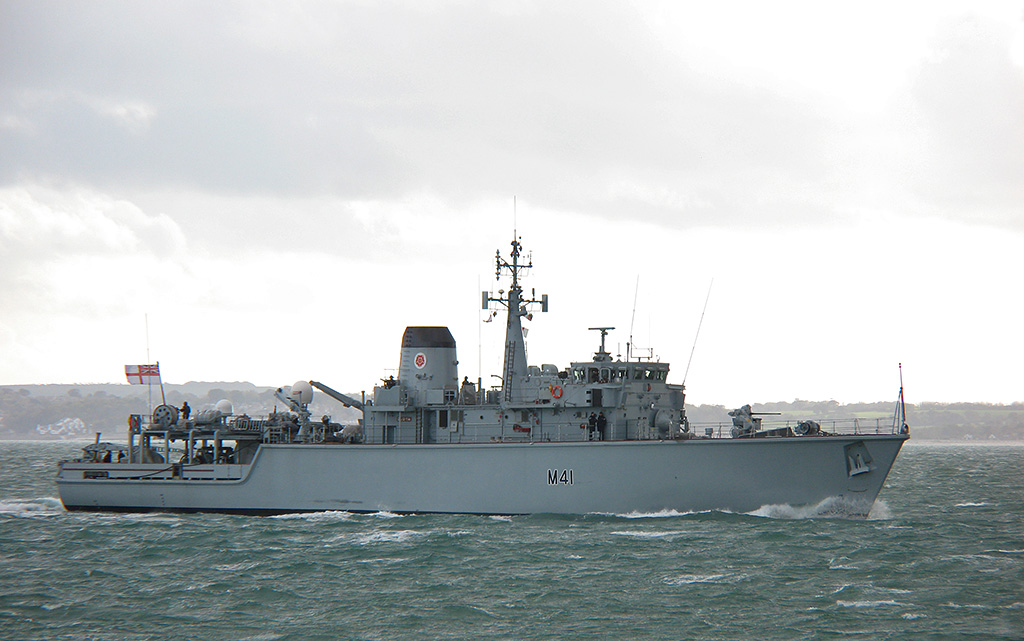
Entering Portsmouth Harbour, October 2008

On 18 March 2007, she was presented with the Freedom of the Borough scroll in Melton Mowbray, Leicestershire.

From May 2011 to September 2014, Quorn was deployed to the Persian Gulf as part of the Royal Navy's permanent presence in the region. Based in Bahrain, Quorn's crew changed every six months enabling the ship to remain on station for a prolonged period without the costs associated with returning to the United Kingdom. During the deployment, Quorn was "twinned" with American minehunter USS Devastator.

Quorn spent the late spring and summer of 2015 on deployment in northern European waters, including the Baltic Sea as part of Standing NATO Mine Countermeasures Group One (SNMCMG1). During the deployment, she took part in Exercise Joint Warrior off Scotland, BALTOPS 2015 alongside HM Ships Iron Duke and Ocean and Kiel Week before returning to Portsmouth in July.

After spending a period alongside in extended readiness, Quorn was lifted out of the water into the "Minor War Vessels Centre of Specialisation"; the former shipbuilding hall at HMNB Portsmouth in December 2016. However, in October 2017 it was revealed that her planned refit would not take place, and Quorn would be decommissioned on 14 December 2017. The ship's bell and naval ensign were presented to Quorn Parish Council in 2018 and are on display in the town's community library.

== Lithuanian Navy ==
On 30 April 2020 Defence Equipment Services announced she had been sold for £1 million to the Lithuanian Navy. In July 2022 the Ministry of Defence announced that Harland & Wolff Appledore had been awarded the £55 million contract to renovate and restore the ship to an operational state. The contract became a casualty of the 2024 collapse of Harland & Wolff and in August 2025 the ship, under her new name Sūduvis (M55), was towed to Klaipėda for completion of the conversion.

== Affiliations ==
- Ipswich, Suffolk
- Melton Mowbray, Leicestershire
- Quorn, Leicestershire
- The Quorn Hunt
- TS Venomous
