= HMS Middleton (M34) =

1984 Hunt-class mine countermeasures vessel of the Royal Navy

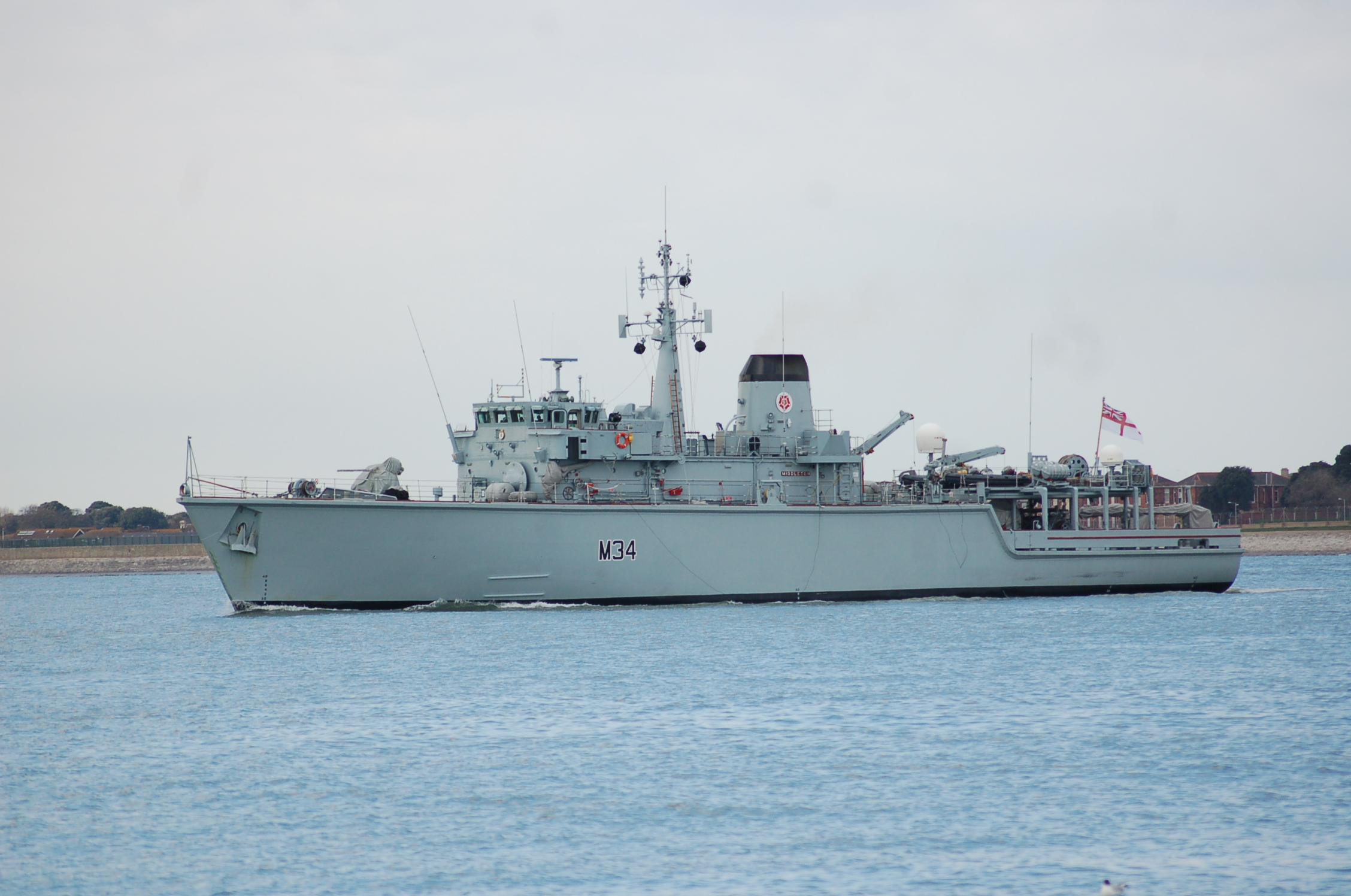
- HMS Middleton in Portsmouth

History

United Kingdom
- Name: HMS Middleton
- Builder: Yarrow Shipbuilders, Glasgow, Scotland
- Launched: 27 April 1983
- Sponsored by: Lady Blaker
- Commissioned: 4 July 1984
- Home port: HMNB Portsmouth
- Identification: IMO number: 4906654; MMSI number: 232311966; Callsign: GYHL; Pennant number: M34
- Status: Active
- Badge

General characteristics
- Class & type: Hunt-class mine countermeasures vessel
- Displacement: 750 t (740 long tons; 830 short tons)
- Length: 60 m (196 ft 10 in)
- Beam: 9.8 m (32 ft 2 in)
- Draught: 2.2 m (7 ft 3 in)
- Propulsion: 2 × Caterpillar C32 ACERT diesels
- Speed: 17 kn (31 km/h; 20 mph)
- Complement: 45 (6 officers & 39 ratings)
- Sensors & processing systems: Sonar Type 2193
- Electronic warfare & decoys: SeaFox mine disposal system; Diver-placed explosive charges
- Armament: 1 × 30mm DS30B S30GM1; 3 × Miniguns (may be replaced by Browning .50 caliber heavy machine guns as of 2023); 2 × General purpose machine guns

HMS Middleton is a Hunt-class mine countermeasures vessel of the British Royal Navy. As of 2021 she formed part of 9th Mine Countermeasures Squadron operating out of HMS Jufair in Bahrain. She was returned to Britain in early 2026.

The ship was launched by Lord and Lady Blaker in 1983: Lady Blaker remains the patron of the ship.

== Operational history ==
In 2009, HMS Middleton sailed for the Persian Gulf for a three-year deployment operating out of Bahrain; she returned to Portsmouth on 31 August 2012.

In early 2013, Middleton entered refit in Portsmouth. The work package included replacing her 30-year-old Napier Deltic engines with new more fuel efficient Caterpillar C32 ACERT diesels. Following sea trials, Middleton rejoined the fleet in 2014 and took part in that autumn's NATO Exercise Joint Warrior off Scotland.

On 9 November 2015, Middleton sailed from Portsmouth for a second three-year deployment in the Persian Gulf. Alongside sister ship HMS Chiddingfold, the two Hunt-class ships form half of the Royal Navy's minehunter force permanently deployed in the region.

In 2018 Middleton returned to the UK, subsequently undergoing an upgrade to carry the Oceanographic Reconnaissance Combat Architecture (ORCA) system which assists vessels with a higher level of mine detection at greater stand-off distances. In mid-2021, Middleton returned to the Gulf accompanied by HMS Bangor to rejoin the other vessels of 9th Mine Countermeasures Squadron operating out of HMS Jufair. Middleton and Bangor were to relieve their sister vessels HMS Brocklesby and HMS Shoreham, which were to return to the UK. HMS Middleton ended up being the last British vessel deployed in the Gulf as all other British naval vessels were withdrawn from the Gulf by late 2025. HMS Middleton herself was returned to the U.K. in early 2026 on a heavy-lift vessel and while it was initially suggested that she was likely to be laid up in "extended readiness" (or uncrewed reserve), it was later reported that she was preparing for refit as of May 2026.

== Affiliations ==
- Middleton, Rochdale
- City of Salford Royal Naval Association, Salford
- Middleton and Chadderton Sea Cadets - TS Tremadoc Bay
- Rochdale Sea Cadets - TS Frobisher II
