= HMS Hurworth (M39) =

1984 Hunt-class mine countermeasures vessel

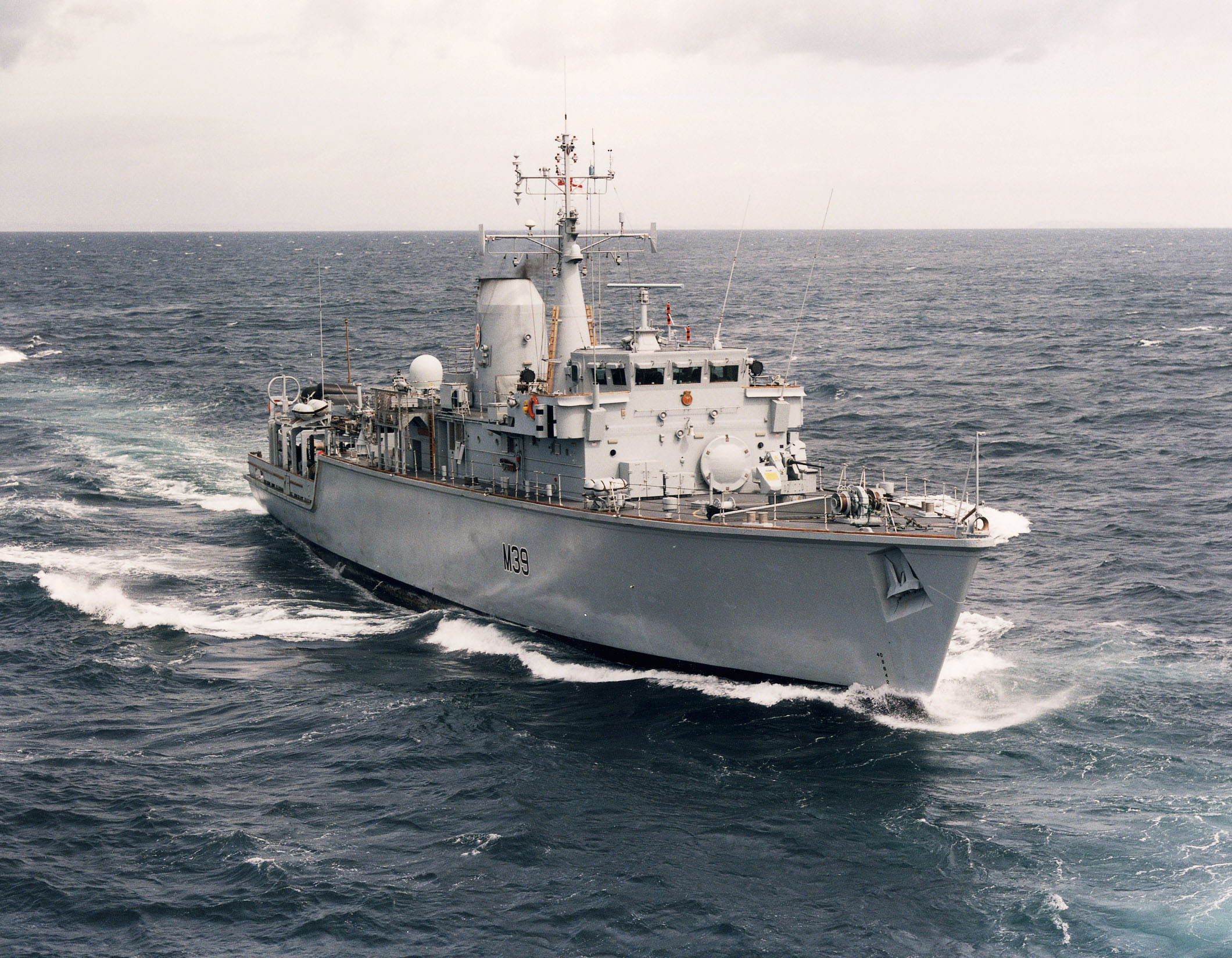
- HMS Hurworth operating in the English Channel

History

United Kingdom
- Name: HMS Hurworth
- Operator: Royal Navy
- Builder: Vosper Thornycroft
- Launched: 25 September 1984
- Sponsored by: Lady Anne Hallifax, wife of Admiral Sir David Hallifax KCB KCVO KBE
- Commissioned: 2 July 1985
- Home port: HMNB Portsmouth, Hampshire
- Identification: Pennant number: M39; IMO number: 4906678; MMSI number: 234600000; Callsign: GBPL
- Status: in active service
- Badge

General characteristics
- Class & type: Hunt-class mine countermeasures vessel
- Displacement: 750 t (740 long tons; 830 short tons)
- Length: 60 m (196 ft 10 in)
- Beam: 9.8 m (32 ft 2 in)
- Draught: 2.2 m (7 ft 3 in)
- Propulsion: 2 shaft Napier Deltic diesel, 3,540 shp (2,640 kW)
- Speed: 17 knots (31 km/h; 20 mph)
- Complement: 6 officers and 39 ratings
- Sensors & processing systems: Sonar Type 2193
- Electronic warfare & decoys: SeaFox mine disposal system; Diver-placed explosive charges
- Armament: 1 × 30mm DS30B S30GM1; 3 × Miniguns (may be replaced by Browning .50 caliber heavy machine guns as of 2023); 2 × General purpose machine guns

HMS Hurworth is a Hunt-class mine countermeasures vessel of the British Royal Navy.

== Service history ==
In March 1987, Hurworth was visiting Ostend when the cross channel ferry Herald of Free Enterprise capsized leaving Zeebrugge; two of her divers were awarded the Queens Gallantry Medal for their efforts in the rescue.

On 2 March 2009, she was the centrepiece of the festivities to mark the 800th anniversary of the granting of a freedom charter by King John to Great Yarmouth.

== Affiliations ==
- Hurworth-on-Tees, Darlington
