= 9th Mine Countermeasures Squadron =

- Active: 1962–1971, 2013–present?
- Country: United Kingdom
- Branch: Royal Navy
- Type: Squadron
- Role: Mine Countermeasures Squadron
- Size: 5 ships as of 2017; 4 ships in 2023; 1 vessel remaining as of end-2025; all crewed vessels withdrawn as of early 2026
- Home port: HMS Jufair, Bahrain

The 9th Mine Countermeasures Squadron has been a front-line squadron of the Royal Navy with responsibility for mine warfare in the Persian Gulf region. The squadron had been based in Bahrain but, as of early-2026, all crewed vessels had been withdrawn to the UK. Normally, a Royal Fleet Auxiliary (RFA) support ship had also been assigned to the squadron. However, in late 2024 the squadron's normal support ship, RFA Cardigan Bay, returned to the UK for refit and acute personnel shortages in the RFA made her replacement in the Gulf uncertain. In early 2025 the mine countermeasures vessel HMS Chiddingfold was also returned to the U.K. while the minehunter HMS Bangor was inactive due to damage sustained in a collision. HMS Bangor was returned to the Clyde naval base on a heavy-lift vessel in preparation for refit in late November 2025. HMS Middleton, the last crewed vessel assigned to the squadron, followed in 2026.

These events seemed to herald the end of the squadron's role, at least until possibly replaced by future mine countermeasures systems.

== History ==
=== 1962–1971 ===
In its original guise, the 9th Mine Sweeping Squadron (MSS) was formed of four Ton-class sweepers – HM Ships Appleton, Kemerton, Flockton and Chilcompton which were specially fitted for the rigours of operating in the Persian Gulf. The ships had their pennant numbers painted in Arabic on the stern and carried a funnel badge featuring a dhow on a yellow background.

The squadron was based in Aden and later Bahrain. When Bahrain and Qatar became independent nations and Trucial States formed into the United Arab Emirates, the squadron was disbanded.

=== 2013–2026 ===
The squadron was reformed in 2013 as the 9th Mine Countermeasures Squadron, the change in title reflecting the advances in mine countermeasures techniques in the intervening 40 years. Up until the early 2020s, the squadron usually consisted of two Hunt-class mine countermeasures vessels and two Sandown-class single role minehunters on three year rotations, supported by a Royal Fleet Auxiliary Bay-class landing ship, normally RFA Cardigan Bay. As in its original guise, the squadron operated out of HMS Jufair in Bahrain and carried the same funnel badge.

With the planned retirement of all the remaining Sandown-class vessels by 2025, and their replacement with both autonomous minehunting systems and supporting "motherships", at minimum a new configuration of the squadron was likely. In February 2023, the autonomous minehunting vessel RNMB Harrier arrived in Bahrain to begin trials of autonomous systems in hot weather. The autonomous vessel was to operate from RFA Cardigan Bay.

In April 2024 a gap in the capability of the squadron was created when Cardigan Bay deployed, initially to the Mediterranean to contribute to the British presence there in the context of the Gaza war, and then, in August, to the U.K. for refit. The squadron was further reduced as the result of the return of HMS Chiddingfold to the U.K. and damage sustained by HMS Bangor making her inactive.

In 2025 it was reported that while HMS Bangor is to be retained in service with the Royal Navy until about 2030, she was nevertheless returned to the U.K., with HMS Middleton following in early 2026. This may lead to the disbandment of 9 MCM Squadron, at least until an alternative capability, incorporating autonomous systems, is put in place.
