= Hunt-class mine countermeasures vessel =

Class of mine countermeasure vessels of the Royal Navy

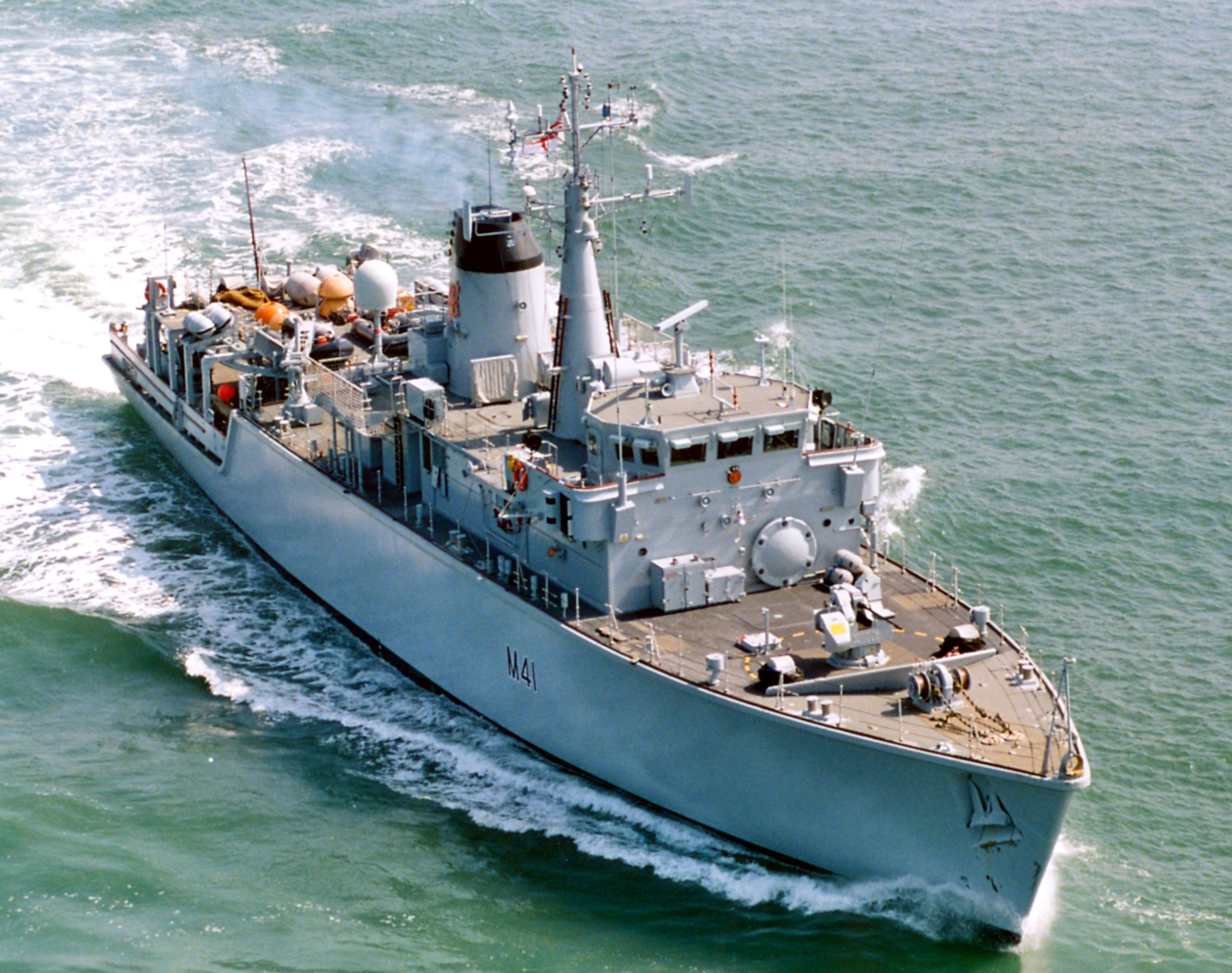
- HMS Quorn (later Sūduvis) in 2001

Class overview
- Name: Hunt class
- Builders: Vosper Thornycroft; Yarrow Shipbuilders Limited
- Operators: Royal Navy; Hellenic Navy; Lithuanian Naval Force
- Built: 1978–1988
- In commission: 1979–present
- Completed: 13
- Active: 9 (5 RN, 1 Hellenic Navy, 3 Lithuanian Navy)
- Laid up: 1 (former HMS Brecon now RN training vessel)
- Lost: 1 (former Hellenic Navy HS Kallisto)
- Retired: 2 (former HMS Chiddingfold & HMS Atherstone)

General characteristics
- Type: Mine countermeasures vessel
- Displacement: 750 t (740 long tons; 830 short tons)
- Length: 60 m (196 ft 10 in)
- Beam: 9.8 m (32 ft 2 in)
- Draught: 2.2 m (7 ft 3 in)
- Propulsion: 2 shaft CAT C32 diesel; 2,000 shp (1,500 kW)
- Speed: 17 kn (31 km/h; 20 mph)
- Complement: 45 (6 officers & 39 ratings)
- Sensors & processing systems: Radar Type 1007 I band/SharpEye navigation radar; Sonar Type 2193
- Electronic warfare & decoys: SeaFox mine disposal system; Diver-placed explosive charges
- Armament: 1 × DS30B Mk 1 30 mm gun; 2 × Miniguns (replaced by Browning .50 caliber heavy machine guns as of 2023); 3 × General purpose machine guns

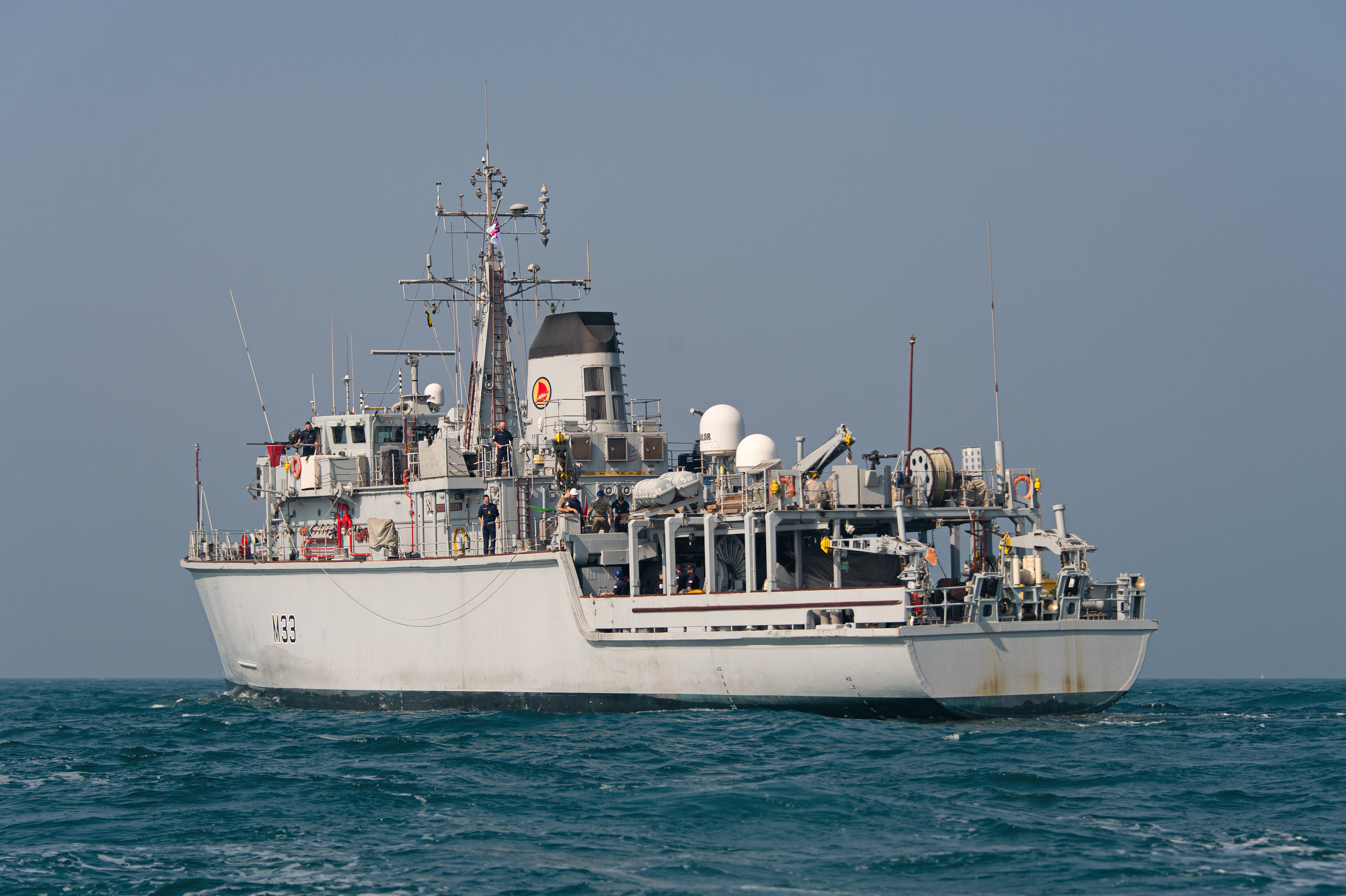
Stern view of HMS Brocklesby off Bahrain in 2021

The Hunt class is a class of thirteen mine countermeasure vessels of the Royal Navy. As built, they combined the separate roles of the traditional minesweeper and that of the active minehunter in one hull, but later modifications saw the removal of mine-sweeping equipment. They have a secondary role as offshore patrol vessels.

== Development ==
Upon introduction in the early 1980s they were the largest warships ever built out of glass-reinforced plastic and were the last in operation to use the Napier Deltic diesel engine. All were built by Vosper Thornycroft in Woolston except Cottesmore and Middleton, which were built by Yarrow Shipbuilders Limited on the River Clyde. Quorn was the last ship of the class launched.

Following the sale of Bicester and Berkeley to the Greek Navy, the sale of Cottesmore and Dulverton to the Lithuanian Navy and the decommissioning of Brecon, a contract to re-engine the remaining eight vessels was signed by BAE Systems in 2008, whereby the existing 30-year old Napier Deltic 9-59K power units were replaced by Caterpillar CAT C32 engines, together with new gearboxes, bow thrusters, propellers and control systems, in a six-year refurbishment programme that was completed in 2018.

The capabilities of the remaining eight vessels of the Hunt class have been significantly enhanced by the installation of Sonar Type 2193 and the NAUTIS 3 command system. The performance of Sonar 2193 exceeds that of any other mine hunting sonar in service in the world today and is capable of detecting and classifying an object the size of a football at a distance of up to 1,000 metres (1,100 yd). In late 2007 Chiddingfold used the Seafox drone, the Royal Navy's mine disposal system, during Exercise Neptune Warrior off Scotland. Seafox is described by the MOD as a "state of the art fire and forget system, capable of destroying mines in depths of up to 300 metres".

The 2021 defence white paper announced that all the Hunt-class vessels would be retired from Royal Navy service in the 2020s and replaced by automated systems. It was subsequently indicated that the withdrawal would occur in the 2029 to 2031 period, though HMS Chiddingfold was already withdrawn in 2026.

In 2023, the navy began to take delivery of six REMUS 300 small autonomous underwater vehicles (SAUVs), produced by Huntington Ingalls Industries. The system is being acquired to enhance the capabilities of the Hunt-class ships and has a reported operating depth of 300 meters with an endurance time of up to 20 hours.

== Ships in the class ==
All 13 ships of this class re-used names from the World War II Hunt-class destroyer. Four of the names had also been used for World War I Hunt-class minesweepers: these were HMS Bicester, Cattistock, Cottesmore and Quorn. HMS Atherstone had been a paddlewheel minesweeper in 1916, and Brocklesby was a coaster taken up from trade in 1916.

Navy	Name	Pennant number	Builder	Launched	Commissioned	Decommissioned	Status
Royal Navy	Brecon	M29	Vosper Thornycroft	1978	1979	2005	Decommissioned, now a static training ship at HMS Raleigh since 2008
Royal Navy	Ledbury	M30	Vosper Thornycroft	1979	1981	In active service	
Royal Navy	Cattistock	M31	Vosper Thornycroft	1981	1982	In active service	
Royal Navy	Brocklesby	M33	Vosper Thornycroft	1982	1983	In active service	
Royal Navy	Middleton	M34	Yarrow Shipbuilders	1983	1984	In active service	Reported preparing for refit as of May 2026
Royal Navy	Chiddingfold	M37	Vosper Thornycroft	1983	1984	Withdrawn from service in 2026	Used as source for spare parts for sister ships
Royal Navy	Atherstone	M38	Vosper Thornycroft	1986	1986	2017	Decommissioned 14 December 2017. Sold 2022.
Royal Navy	Hurworth	M39	Vosper Thornycroft	1984	1985	In active service	
Hellenic Navy	HS Europa	M62	Vosper Thornycroft	1985	1988 / 2001	2000 / In active service	Former HMS Bicester
Hellenic Navy	HS Kallisto	M63	Vosper Thornycroft	1986	1988 / 2001	2001 / 2020	Former HMS Berkeley, cut in two in a collision with a container ship on 27 October 2020.
Lithuanian Naval Force	Skalvis	M53	Yarrow Shipbuilders	1982	1983 / 2011	2005 / In active service	Former HMS Cottesmore
Lithuanian Naval Force	Kuršis	M54	Vosper Thornycroft	1982	1983 / 2011	2004 / In active service	Former HMS Dulverton
Lithuanian Naval Force	Sūduvis	M55	Vosper Thornycroft	1988	1989 / ?	2017 / To be recommissioned following refit	Former HMS Quorn. Decommissioned 14 December 2017. Sold to Lithuania in 2020. Towed to Lithuania to undergo modernization refit as of 2025.

== See also ==
- Sandown-class minehunter
