= Timeline of shipbuilding on the River Tyne =

The following is a timeline of the history of shipbuilding on the River Tyne in Tyne and Wear, England.

== 13th century ==
=== 1290s ===
- 1294
  - A galley for King Edward I was built at the mouth of Lort Burn, Newcastle upon Tyne, one of twenty ordered by the King from different ports
- 1295
  - September: Galley for Edward I was completed

== 15th century ==
=== 1400s ===
- 1400s
  - The Newcastle Guild of Shipwrights had been a recognised trade since the 1400s

== 16th century ==
=== 1500s ===
- 1508
  - A 'rowbarge' was constructed for Newcastle upon Tyne

== 17th century ==
=== 1600s ===
- 1604
  - The Newcastle Guild of Shipwrights (along with 14 other lesser craft trades) finally achieved full Guild status
- 1604–1616
  - Newcastle Guild of Shipwrights members built ten ships 'fit for service', ie able to act at naval auxiliaries in time of war

== 18th century ==
=== 1720s ===
- 1720s
  - Robert Wallis opened the first shipbuilding yard in South Shields

=== 1740s ===
- 1740
  - Only four ships, of an estimated 800 tons, were registered to South Shields

=== 1750s ===
- 1750
  - Russell was launched by Headlam's yard (Gateshead), the largest vessel built on the Tyne up to that time, able to carry 30 keels of coal
- 1756
  - William Rowe began building ships on the Tyne (St Peter's yard, Newcastle upon Tyne)

=== 1760s ===
- 1763
  - HMS Solebay, a frigate of 28 guns, was launched by Thomas Airey & Co of Newcastle upon Tyne, attracting a 'great concourse of spectators'

=== 1770s ===
- 1772
  - Lockwood Broderick began building ships at South Shields

== 19th century ==
=== 1800s ===
- 1800
  - Newcastle upon Tyne was the third largest shipbuilding port in England behind London and Liverpool
- 1809
  - 500 ships, totalling over 100,000 tons, were registered to South Shields, which hosted 12 shipbuilding yards and an even larger number of docks

=== 1810s ===
- 1810
  - William Rowe was bought out by Thomas and William Smith, who continued shipbuilding at St Peter's yard, Newcastle upon Tyne
  - Thomas and William Smith acquired Laing's Dock at North Shields as an additional repairing establishment

=== 1820s ===
- 1820
  - Robert and William Hawthorn opened an engine works at Forth Banks, Newcastle upon Tyne, building three pairs of engines for steam packets in he first year
- 1828
  - Duke of Roxburgh, of 417 tons burthen, launched by Thomas and William Smith
- 1829
  - 26 December: George Green launched by Thomas and William Smith

=== 1830s ===
- 1830
  - Thomas Dunn Marshall began building ships in part of the old yard of Robert Wallis in South Shields
- 1834
  - 6 May: The last of the River Tyne state (or Mayoral) barges was launched by Messrs John Oliver at South Shields
- 1839
  - Thomas Dunn Marshall built the Tyne's first iron steamer, a small passenger ship named Star

=== 1840s ===
- 1840
  - Charles Coutts established a shipbuilding yard at Walker, Newcastle upon Tyne
- 1841
  - Thomas Dunn Marshall completed an iron twin-screw ferry named Bedlington
- 1842
  - The first Tyne-built iron-hulled steamer, Prince Albert, was launched at Coutts shipyard in Walker, Newcastle upon Tyne
- 1842-1852
  - The shipyard of Thomas Dunn Marshall in South Shields built 10 wooden ships and 99 iron vessels
- 1847
  - WG Armstong & Co founded at Elswick, Newcastle upon Tyne, on a 5.5 acre site, to build the hydraulic machinery Armstrong had invented

=== 1850s ===
- 1851
  - Charles Palmer and his brother George, opened a shipyard at Jarrow on the site of an earlier yard which had built wooden warships for the Royal Navy
- 1852
  - April: Northumberland, an iron paddle tug, was launched, the first vessel constructed by Palmers
  - 30 June: Iron-built steam collier John Bowes was launched, the second vessel built by Palmers
  - Andrew Leslie established a shipbuilding yard at Hebburn
- 1853
  - Charles Mitchell established a shipyard at Low Walker, Newcastle upon Tyne
- 1856
  - 24 April: HMS Terror, battleship, launched by Palmers
  - The shipbuilding yard of Charles Coutts in Walker, Newcastle upon Tyne was closed
- 1857
  - Blast furnaces for the production of pig-iron were established at Palmers Jarrow shipyard
- 1858
  - Palmers built ships Hudson and Weser for Norddeutscher Lloyd
- 1859
  - Palmers took over a shipyard at Willington Quay, Howdon

=== 1860s ===
- 1860
  - John Wigham Richardson opened the Neptune shipbuilding yard at Low Walker, Newcastle upon Tyne, taking over the former Charles Coutts yard
  - March: Port Musgrave launched by Palmers at their Howdon yard
  - 11 April: SS Connaught, a Royal Mail paddle steamer, was launched by Palmers
  - July: The first ship was launched by John Wigham Richardson, a paddle steamer Victoria
  - 1 September: SS Hibernia, a Royal Mail paddle steamer, was launched by Palmers
- 1861
  - Ambrose completed at the Neptune yard of John Wigham Richardson
  - HMS Defence launched at Palmer Bros yard in Jarrow
- 1863
  - 15 August: Palmers launched four vessels simultaneously, Europa and Latana from the Jarrow yard and John McIntyre and No.1 from the Howdon yard
- 1866
  - HMS Jumna, troopship, launched by Palmers
- 1868
  - A gunboat for the Admiralty built to WG Armstrong's order by CW Mitchell's shipyard at Walker

=== 1870s ===
- 1872
  - R and W Hawthorn opened a marine engine building works at St Peter's in the east end of Newcastle
  - HMS Cerberus and HMS Gorgon, coastal defence ships, were completed by Palmers
- 1873
  - Charles Mitchell established a shipyard at Wallsend
- 1874
  - Charles Mitchell appointed Charles Sheridan Swan as manager and the business became known as CS Swan & Company
- 1875
  - HMS Sabrina and HMS Spey, river gunboats, were completed by Palmers
- 1876
  - HMS Medina, a gunboat, was launched by Palmers Shipbuilding and Iron Company at Jarrow
  - HMS Tees, HMS Esk and HMS Tweed, river gunboats, were delivered by Palmers
- 1877
  - Palmers Shipbuilding and Iron Company had the highest output of ships in Britain
- 1878
  - John Readhead & Sons began building their first ship for the Hain Line
  - The flat-iron colliers, Roystone and Vauxhall were launched by Palmers
- 1879
  - Palmers Shipbuilding and Iron Company had the highest output of ships in Britain

=== 1880s ===
- 1880–1883
  - Palmers Shipbuilding and Iron Company had the highest output of ships in Britain
- 1880
  - George Burton Hunter was appointed as manager of CS Swan & Company and the company became known as CS Swan & Hunter
  - Cornelia, a steam yacht for the Marquess of Londonderry, was completed by Palmers
- 1881
  - The oil tanker Massis was completed at Armstong Mitchells shipyard in Low Walker
- 1882
  - WG Armstrongs merged with Charles Mitchell's shipyard at Low Walker to become Armstrong Mitchells
- 1884
  - January: Albatross, the first steel ship built by Palmers, was launched
  - Shipyard devoted exclusively to warship construction opened by WG Armstrong at Elswick
- 1885
  - HMS Surprise and HMS Alacrity, naval despatch vessels, were delivered by Palmers
- 1886
  - R and W Hawthorn merged with A. Leslie and Company shipbuilders in Hebburn to become R. & W. Hawthorn, Leslie and Company
  - Glückauf launched at Armstong Mitchells for German owners, regarded as a prototype of the modern day oil tanker
  - HMS Orlando, cruiser, launched by Palmers
- 1887
  - 22 January: Era, an oil tanker, was launched by Palmers
- 1888
  - John Wigham Richardson's Neptune shipyard delivered the passenger liner and troopship Alfonso XII
  - Palmers Shipbuilding and Iron Company had the highest output of ships in Britain
- 1889
  - Palmers Shipbuilding and Iron Company had the highest output of ships in Britain

=== 1890s ===
- 1890
  - John Wigham Richardson's Neptune shipyard completed Hornby Grange at the Neptune yard for the Houlder Line, one of the world's first refrigerated cargo ships
  - Citta di Venezia completed at the John Wigham Richardson Neptune yard
- 1891
  - HMS Rainbow, cruiser, was launched by Palmers
- 1892
  - 28 May: HMS Resolution, battleship, launched by Palmers
- 1893
  - HMS Revenge, battleship, completed by Palmers
- 1894
  - Turbinia, the first steam turbine powered ship, launched for Parsons Marine Steam Turbine Company, which had been founded in that year by Charles Parsons
  - Blanco Encalada launched by Armstrong Mitchell at Elswick, a cruiser for the Chilean Navy
- 1895
  - CS Swan & Hunter became a limited company
- 1896
  - HMS Star, destroyer, launched by Palmers
- 1897
  - HMS Pegasus and HMS Pyramus, cruisers, and HMS Flirt, a destroyer, were launched by Palmers
  - Armstrong Mitchells merged with the Manchester armaments works of Whitworths to become Armstrong Whitworth
  - Palmers output of shipping for the year was 40,319 tons, comprising 13 vessels launched from the Jarrow and Howdon yards
- 1898
  - August: RMS Ultonia launched at Swan Hunter's Wallsend yard for the Cunard Line
  - The icebreaker Yermak was launched at Low Walker yard of Armstrong Whitworth for the Russian government
  - America Maru completed by John Wigham Richardson
- 1899
  - September: RMS Ivernia launched by Swan Hunter at Wallsend for the Cunard Line
  - Veria built by Armstrong Whitworth at Low Walker for the Cunard Line

== 20th century ==
=== 1900s ===
- 1900
  - 10 September: Keel of RMS Carpathia was laid by CS Swan & Hunter at their Wallsend yard
  - Canadian delivered by Hawthorn Leslie at Hebburn for the Leyland Line
  - Caria built by the Tyne Iron Shipbuilding Company for the Cunard Line
  - Consuelo built by Swan Hunter for Thomas Wilson Sons & Co.
  - Iwate, a Japanese cruiser, was launched at the Elswick shipyard of Armstrong Whitworth
  - HNoMS Norge and HNoMS Eidsvold, coastal defence ships for Norway, were launched at the Elswick shipyard of Armstrong Whitworth
  - WG Armstrong died, at which point his engineering works stretched over 230 acres and employed 25,000 men
- 1901
  - Kingstonian delivered by Hawthorn Leslie at Hebburn for the Leyland Line
  - HMS Russell, battleship, was launched by Palmers
- 1902
  - February: Hanoverian launched by Hawthorn Leslie at Hebburn for the Leyland Line
  - 6 August: RMS Carpathia launched by CS Swan & Hunter at their Wallsend yard for the Cunard Line
  - John Wigham Richardson's Neptune shipyard delivered Colonia, its first cableship, then the largest cable ship in the world
  - Flavia built by Palmers Shipbuilding and Iron Company for the Cunard Line
  - The tanker SS Silverlip was launched at Low Walker shipyard of Armstrong Whitworth
- 1903
  - RMS Carpathia completed by CS Swan & Hunter at their Wallsend yard for the Cunard Line
  - John Wigham Richardson's shipbuilding company merged with Swan Hunter in Wallsend to become Swan Hunter and Wigham Richardson
- 1904
  - Hawthorn Leslie's St Peters works began building Parsons turbine engines for ships
  - Turbine powered steam yacht, Albion completed at the Swan Hunter Wallsend yard
  - Keel of RMS Mauretania was laid at Swan Hunter and Wigham Richardson's Wallsend yard
  - HMS Sapphire, cruiser, launched by Palmers
- 1905
  - 7 March: SS Viking launched at Armstrong Whitworths Walker yard for the Isle of Man Steam Packet Company
- 1906
  - 4 September: HMS Lord Nelson, a battleship for the Royal Navy, was launched by Palmers Shipbuilding and Iron Company
  - 20 September: RMS Mauretania was launched by the Dowager Duchess of Roxburghe at Swan Hunter and Wigham Richardson's Wallsend yard for the Cunard Line, and was the largest passenger ship completed on the Tyne
  - Swan Hunter held the world record for gross tonnage of shipping constructed in the year
  - The first of two electric cableway crane networks was installed at Palmers Jarrow yard
- 1907
  - 13 April: The battlecruiser HMS Invincible was launched at the Elswick shipyard of Armstrong Whitworth watched by over 12,000 people
  - Swan Hunter's output of ships was 15% of the world's total tonnage built that year, when the Neptune and Wallsend yards were building 11 vessels in the year
  - Ocean Prince completed at the Swan Hunter Wallsend yard for the Prince Line
- 1908
  - SS Afrique completed at the Swan Hunter Wallsend yard
- 1909
  - Ausonia built by Swan Hunter for the Cunard Line
  - Palmers Shipbuilding and Iron Company yard at Jarrow stretched nearly three quarters of a mile along the southern bank of the Tyne

=== 1910s ===
- 1910
  - 23 July: RMS Franconia launched by Swan Hunter for the Cunard Line
  - HMS Hercules, battleship, launched by Palmers
  - HMS Viking, destroyer, delivered by Palmers
- 1911
  - July: RMS Laconia launched by Swan Hunter for the Cunard Line
  - August: City of Birmingham, cargo liner, launched at Palmers Hebburn yard
  - Palmers leased the former Robert Stephenson shipyard at Hebburn
  - Acujutla completed at the Swan Hunter Neptune yard for the Salvador Railway Company
  - Asconia built by Swan Hunter for the Cunard Line
- 1912
  - 20 March: HMS Queen Mary, battlecruiser, launched by Palmers
  - 26 September: SS Reina Victoria-Eugenia, a steam ocean liner, launched by Swan Hunter for the Compañía Transatlántica Española
  - Swan Hunter held the world record for gross tonnage of shipping constructed in the year
  - Palmers purchased the former Robert Stephenson shipyard at Hebburn
- 1912-1913
  - Armstrong Whitworths' Walker Naval Yard began production
- 1913
  - 22 February: San Fraterno was launched at the Swan Hunter Wallsend yard for the Eagle Oil and Shipping Company, it then being the largest oil tanker in the world
  - November: Armstrong Whitworth employed 20,669 people on the Tyne
  - HMS Shark, a destroyer, was completed Swan Hunter's Wallsend yard
- 1914
  - By September nearly 2,000 men from Armstrong Whitworth had enlisted in the British Army, as well as nearly 1,000 from Hawthorn & Leslie
  - The icebreakers Alexander Nevsk and Sviatogor were completed at Low Walker yard of Armstrong Whitworth
- 1915
  - Karoa was completed at the Swan Hunter Neptune yard for the British India Steam Navigation Company
  - HMS Resolution, the second battleship of the name launched by Palmers
- 1916
  - 15 August: HMS Furious, a Courageous-class battlecruiser for the Royal Navy, was launched by Armstrong Whitworths
  - The cable repair ship, HMTS Monarch, was completed at the Swan Hunter Neptune yard
- 1917
  - Auronia built by Swan Hunter for the Cunard Line
- 1918
  - November: Numbers employed by Armstrong Whitworth had risen to just under 60,000
  - HMS Coventry completed at Swan Hunter's Wallsend yard
  - The submarine, HMS L5, completed at the Swan Hunter Wallsend yard
  - Vellavia built by Armstrong Whitworth for the Cunard Line
  - The destroyer, HMS Whirlwind, was completed at the Swan Hunter Wallsend yard
- 1919
  - 11 September: HMS Hermes, an aircraft carrier for the Royal Navy, launched by Armstrong Whitworth
  - Newcastle Shipbuilding Company established under the chairmanship of John Crass

=== 1920s ===
- 1920-22
  - Swan Hunter, Palmers and Armstrong Whitworth each launched 90,000 gross registered tons in a single year
- 1921
  - 22 March: RMS Ausonia launched by Armstrong Whitworth for the Cunard Line
  - 9 April: RMS Laconia launched by Swan Hunter for the Cunard Line
  - SS City of Paris built by Swan Hunter for the Ellerman Lines
  - SS Giulio Cesare completed at Swan Hunter's Wallsend yard for Navigazione Generale Italiana
  - SS San Gaspar, an oil tanker for the Eagle Oil and Shipping Company, was launched by Palmers
- 1922
  - 24 August: SS Mongolia launched at Armstrong Whitworth's Walker Naval yard for P&O
  - Meduana completed at the Swan Hunter Wallsend yard
  - SS San Gerardo, an oil tanker for the Eagle Oil and Shipping Company, was launched by Palmers
- 1923
  - February: CS Faraday, a cable ship for Siemens Brothers, was launched at Palmers
  - Talma completed by Hawthorn Leslie at Hebburn for the British India Steam Navigation Company
  - Output on the Tyne dropped to its lowest level for 30 years at about 140,000 gross registered tons
  - Armstrong Whitworth launched under 19,000 gross registered tons and had six of its ten berths empty
  - Hawthorn Leslie launched under 12,000 gross registered tons
- 1924
  - September: SS Ranpura launched by Hawthorn Leslie at Hebburn for P&O
  - Auronia built by Swan Hunter for the Cunard Line
  - SS Tilawa completed by Hawthorn Leslie at Hebburn for the British India Steam Navigation Company
- 1925
  - Andonia built by Hawthorn Leslie for the Cunard Line
  - Asconia built by Armstrong Whitworth for the Cunard Line
  - SS Ranchi launched by Hawthorn Leslie at Hebburn for P&O
  - MS Gripsholm completed at the Armstrong Whitworth Walker Naval Yard for the Swedish American Line, the first passenger liner powered by diesel engines
  - Inanda completed at the Swan Hunter Wallsend yard for the Harrison Line
  - Langleeford and British Chemist launched by Palmers, the only two ships they launched in that year and in total launching just over 11,000 gross registered tons
- 1926
  - The oil tanker British Governor was completed at the Swan Hunter Neptune yard for the British Tanker Company
- 1927
  - 30 April: Port Gisborne was launched at the Swan Hunter Wallsend yard for the Port Line, the event being broadcast on the BBC Radio Home Service
  - Vickers-Armstrongs was created with the merging of Vickers Limited and Armstrong Whitworth
  - After completion of the battleship HMS Nelson, the Armstrong Whitworth Walker Naval Yard was closed due to lack of orders
- 1928
  - HMS York, a cruiser, was launched by Palmers
- 1929
  - September: Vikingen launched at Swan Hunter, a whale factory ship for Norwegian owners
  - RMS Knight of Malta was completed at the Swan Hunter Neptune yard

=== 1930s ===
- 1930
  - October: Appalachee, a tanker for the Anglo American Oil Company, was launched by Palmers, the last merchant ship built at the Jarrow yard
- 1931
  - February: British Strength, a tanker for the British Tanker Company, was launched at Palmers Hebburn yard. Palmers last merchant ship and the only ship they launched that year
  - 17 March: Monarch of Bermuda launched at Vickers Armstongs Walker Naval Yard for Furness Withy
- Palmers Shipbuilding and Iron Company recorded losses of £119,000
- 1932
  - 19 June: HMS Duchess, a D-class destroyer, launched by Palmers Shipbuilding and Iron Company, the last ship Palmers launched and the 982nd vessel built by the company
- 1933
  - SS Queen of Bermuda completed at Vickers Armstrong Walker Naval Yard
  - Palmers Shipbuilding and Iron Company went into receivership
- 1934
  - SS Twickenham Ferry completed at the Swan Hunter Neptune yard
  - The receiver sold Palmers to National Shipbuilding Security Ltd who then sold the Jarrow yard to a demolition company
- 1935
  - Joseph Medill completed at the Swan Hunter Wallsend yard
  - Most of Palmers Jarrow yard was dismantled by a demolition company
- 1937
  - 3 September: HMS Eskimo, a Tribal-class destroyer, was launched at Vickers Armstrongs Walker Naval Yard
  - 3 September: HMS Mashona, a Tribal-class destroyer, was also launched at Vickers Armstrongs Walker Naval Yard
  - HMS Manchester, a light cruiser, launched by Hawthorn Leslie at Hebburn
- 1938
  - March: HMS Edinburgh launched at Swan Hunter's Wallsend yard
  - 27 July: QSMV Dominion Monarch launched at Swan Hunter's Wallsend yard for the Shaw, Savill & Albion Line, then the largest diesel motor-driven ship in the world
- 1939
  - 21 February: HMS King George V launched at Walker Naval Yard of Vickers Armstrong, a King George V-class battleship for the Royal Navy
  - 5 April: HMS Illustrious launched by Vickers Armstrong, an Illustrious-class aircraft carrier for the Royal Navy
  - 14 September: HMS Victorious launched by Vickers Armstrong, an Illustrious-class aircraft carrier for the Royal Navy
  - MS Sobieski completed at the Swan Hunter Neptune yard for the Gdynia America Line
  - HMS Tartar, a Tribal-class destroyer, completed at Swan Hunter's Wallsend yard

=== 1940s ===
- 1940
  - 24 February: HMS Anson launched by Swan Hunters, a King George V-class battleship for the Royal Navy
  - Vickers Armstrong naval shipyard employed 4,250 people
- 1941
  - March: Armstrong Whitworth's Low Walker yard employed 505 people, just nine months after it had opened to build partly prefabricated ships
- 1942
  - 31 March: HMS Abercrombie launched by Vickers Armstrong, a Roberts-class monitor for the Royal Navy
  - 22 December: Empire Sandy launched by Clelands Shipbuilding Company at Willington Quay, a tug for the Overseas Towage and Salvage Company
- 1943
  - 21 April: Empire John launched by Clelands Shipbuilding Company at Willington Quay, a tug for William Watkins Ltd
  - 2 September: Empire Winnie launched by Clelands Shipbuilding Company at Willington Quay, a tug for William Watkins Ltd
  - 30 September: HMS Colossus, a Colossus-class light aircraft carrier, was launched by Vickers Armstrongs for the Royal Navy
  - 27 November: Empire Aid launched by Clelands Shipbuilding Company at Willington Quay, a tug for the Overseas Towage and Salvage Company
  - HMS Vindex, a Nairana-class escort carrier, completed at Swan Hunter's Wallsend yard
- 1944
  - 23 February: HMS Vengeance, a Colossus-class light aircraft carrier for the Royal Navy was launched by Swan Hunter
  - 22 April: Empire Julia launched by Clelands Shipbuilding Company at Willington Quay, a tug for the Overseas Towage and Salvage Company
  - 19 July: Empire Susan launched by Clelands Shipbuilding Company at Willington Quay, a tug for William Watkins Ltd
  - 17 October: Empire Jean launched by Clelands Shipbuilding Company at Willington Quay, a tug for the Overseas Towage and Salvage Company, completed as Empire Mary
  - 30 December: Empire Rosa launched by Clelands Shipbuilding Company at Willington Quay, a tug for William Watkins Ltd, completed as Empire Jean
- 1945
  - 25 April: Empire Bess launched by Clelands Shipbuilding Company at Willington Quay, a tug for the United Towing Co Ltd
  - 28 May: HMS Alamein launched at Hawthorn Leslie by Lady Alexander
  - Vickers-Armstrongs plants at Elswick and Scotswood together were the largest employers in Newcastle
- 1948
  - SS Gothic completed at Swans Hunter's Wallsend yard for the Shaw, Savill & Albion Line

=== 1950s ===
- 1950
  - 17 May: Muristan launched at John Readhead & Sons, South Shields, an oil tanker for the Strick Line
  - 27 July: SS Ocean Monarch launched at the Walker Naval Yard of Vickers Armstrong
  - Assyria built by Swan Hunter for the Cunard Line
  - Velutina, an oil tanker for Shell, completed at Swan Hunter's Wallsend yard
- 1952
  - September: TS Leda, launched by Princess Astrid of Norway at Swan Hunter's Wallsend yard for the Bergen Steamship Company
- 1953
  - 28 May: City of Durban launched by Armstrong Whitworth for the Ellerman Lines
- 1955
  - July: MS Bergensfjord launched at Swan Hunter's Wallsend yard by Princess Astrid of Norway, for the Norwegian America Line, watched by 5,000 people
- 1956
  - RMS Empress of England launched at Walker Naval Yard of Vickers Armstrong for Canadian Pacific
- 1958
  - Swan Hunter achieved a profit of over £1m

=== 1960s ===
- 1960
  - 10 May: RMS Empress of Canada launched at Walker Naval Yard of Vickers Armstrong for Canadian Pacific, the second largest liner to be built on the Tyne
  - September: SS Príncipe Perfeito launched by Swan Hunter for the Companhia Nacional de Navegação
  - MV Lobito Palm completed at Swan Hunter's Neptune yard for the Palm Line
  - By 1960 John Readhead and Sons at South Shields had built 87 vessels for the Hain Line
- 1961
  - June: SS Northern Star launched by the Queen Mother at Vickers Armstrong Walker Naval Yard for Shaw, Savill & Albion Line and was the last passenger ship built there
- 1962
  - Clan Finlay completed at Swan Hunter's Wallsend yard for the Clan Line
- 1963
  - June: Media delivered by John Readhead & Sons at South Shields for the Cunard Line
  - Saxonia launched by John Readhead & Sons at South Shields for the Cunard Line
- 1966–1968
  - Shipbuilders on the Tyne were merged into Swan Hunter, including John Readhead & Sons at South Shields, Vickers Armstrong at Walker, Hawthorn Leslie at Hebburn and Clelands Shipbuilding at Willington Quay
- 1968
  - 19 December: RFA Green Rover, a fleet tanker, launched at Swan Hunter Hebburn yard for the Royal Fleet Auxiliary
  - Vickers-Armstrongs sold off their naval yard at Walker, Newcastle upon Tyne
- 1969
  - 17 January: Tabiristan launched at Swan Hunter South Shields for the Strick Line
  - 5 March: MV Vortigern launched at Swan Hunter Neptune yard for the British Railways Board
  - 2 April: SS Atlantic Causeway, a container ship, launched at Swan Hunter Walker yard for the Atlantic Container Line
  - 17 April: RFA Grey Rover, a fleet tanker, launched at Swan Hunter Hebburn yard for the Royal Fleet Auxiliary
  - 2 May: Esso Northumbria, a crude oil tanker, launched by Princess Anne at Swan Hunter's Wallsend yard for Esso
  - 30 June: Amra launched at Swan Hunter South Shields yard for British India Navigation Co Ltd
  - 4 July: Emiliano Zapata launched at Swan Hunter Hebburn yard for Petróleos Mexicanos
  - 25 August: SS Atlantic Conveyor, a container ship, launched at Swan Hunter Walker yard for the Atlantic Container Line
  - 11 November: RFA Blue Rover, a fleet tanker, launched at Swan Hunter Hebburn yard for the Royal Fleet Auxiliary

=== 1970s ===
- 1970
  - 9 January: Aska launched at Swan Hunter South Shields yard for British India Navigation Co Ltd
  - 21 March: Manora launched at Swan Hunter Neptune yard for British India Navigation Co Ltd
  - 5 May: MV Dart America launched at Swan Hunter Walker yard for the Dart Container Line
  - 4 June: Nigaristan launched at Swan Hunter South Shields yard for Strick Line
  - 6 June: Esso Hibernia, a crude oil tanker, launched at Swan Hunter Wallsend yard for Esso, the second of eight supertankers built at Wallsend between 1968 and 1976
  - 19 June: Faraday launched at Swan Hunter Hebburn yard for the Nile Steamship Co Ltd
  - 22 June: Merkara launched at Swan Hunter Neptune yard for British India Navigation Co Ltd
  - 14 October: MV Dart Atlantic launched at Swan Hunter Walker yard for the Dart Container Line
  - 15 October: Stolt Lion launched at Swan Hunter Hebburn yard for Anglomar Shipping
  - 11 November: Sheaffield launched at Swan Hunter South Shields yard for Sheaf Steam Ship Company
  - 30 November: Morvada launched at Swan Hunter Neptune yard for British India Navigation Co Ltd
- 1971
  - 26 January: Texaco Great Britain launched at Swan Hunter Wallsend yard for Texaco
  - 14 April: Mulbera launched at Swan Hunter Neptune yard for British India Navigation Co Ltd
  - 23 June: TEV Rangatira launched at Swan Hunter Walker yard for the Union Steam Ship Company
  - 25 June: Zaida launched at Swan Hunter South Shields yard for British India Navigation Co Ltd
  - 12 July: Lincolnshire launched at Swan Hunter Hebburn yard for the Bibby Line
  - 20 October: Chemical Explorer launched at Swan Hunter Hebburn yard for Anglo-Eastern Group
- 1972
  - 1 February: Zira launched at Swan Hunter South Shields yard for British India Navigation Co Ltd
  - 16 March: Chemical Venturer launched at Swan Hunter Hebburn yard for Anglo-Eastern Group
  - 17 March: London Lion launched at Swan Hunter Wallsend yard for Anglomar Shipping
  - 15 May: Vistafjord launched at Swan Hunter's Neptune yard for the Norwegian America Line, the last passenger liner constructed on the Tyne
  - 12 June: Rumuera launched at Swan HUnter Walker yard for Overseas Containers
  - 11 July: Joseph R Smallwood launched at the Swan Hunter Hebburn yard for the Nile Steamship Co Ltd
  - 25 August: Corabank launched at the Swan Hunter South Shields yard for the Bank Line
  - 12 November: Meadowbank launched at the Swan Hunter Wallsend yard for the Bank Line
- 1973
  - 6 February: Frank D Moores launched at Swan Hunter's Hebburn yard for the Nile Steamship Co Ltd
  - 7 March: RFA Gold Rover launched at the Swan Hunter Neptune yard for the Royal Fleet Auxiliary
  - 3 May: World Unicorn launched by Princess Anne at Swan Hunter Wallsend yard for World-Wide Shipping Company
  - 31 May: Forthbank launched at the Swan Hunter Hebburn yard for the Bank Line
  - 1 June: Moraybank launched at the Swan Hunter South Shields yard for the Bank Line
  - 30 August: RFA Black Rover launched at the Swan Hunter Neptune yard for the Royal Fleet Auxiliary
  - 14 September: Alnwick Castle launched at the Swan Hunter Walker yard for the Bamburgh Shipping Co
  - 26 November: Clydebank launched at Swan Hunter's Hebburn yard for the Bank Line
  - HMS Bristol, a Type 82 destroyer, completed at Swan Hunter's Neptune yard, the largest warship launched at that yard
- 1974
  - 7 February: Ivybank launched at the Swan Hunter South Shields yard for the Bank Line
  - 21 June: Windsor Lion launched at the Swan Hunter Wallsend yard for Anglomar Shipping
  - 4 July: Helena K launched at Swan Hunter Hebburn yard for Nikreis Maritime (Swan Maritime)
  - 1 October: Yorkshire launched at the Swan Hunter Walker yard for Bibby Line
  - 13 November: Robcap I launched at Swan Hunter Neptune yard for Nikreis Maritime (Swan Maritime)
- 1975
  - 24 April: HMS Newcastle, a Type 42 destroyer, launched at the Swan Hunter Neptune yard for the Royal Navy
  - 25 April: Strait of Conso launched at Swan Hunter South Shields yard for Common Brothers
  - 6 October: Tyne Pride launched at the Swan Hunter Wallsend yard for Meridor Tankers, at 262,000 deadweight tonnes it was the largest ship ever built on the Tyne
  - 20 October: Gandara launched at Swan Hunter Hebburn yard for P&O
  - 4 December: Kara Lynn launched at the Swan Hunter Walker yard for Nikreis Maritime (Swan Maritime)
- 1976
  - 16 February: Robcap II launched at Swan Hunter Hebburn yard for Nikreis Maritime (Swan Maritime)
  - 13 April: Robcap III launched at Swan Hunter Neptune yard for Nikreis Maritime (Swan Maritime)
  - 14 April: HMS Glasgow launched at the Swan Hunter Neptune yard for the Royal Navy
  - 12 May: MV Hindustan launched at Swan Hunter South Shields yard for Common Brothers
  - 8 September: Robcap IV launched at Swan Hunter Hebburn yard for Nikreis Maritime (Swan Maritime)
  - 24 September: Everett F Wells launched at Swan Hunter Wallsend yard for the Ashland Oil Company
- 1977
  - 3 February: IIS Kharg launched at Swan Hunter Walker yard for the Imperial Iranian Navy
  - 17 March: Singularity launched at Swan Hunter's South Shields yard for FT Everard
  - 2 May: Lagoven Santa Rita launched at Swan Hunter Hebburn yard for Lagoven SA, Venezuela
  - 13 July: Begonia launched at Swan Hunter Walker yard for the Stag Line
  - 21 July: Starman Anglia launched at the Swan Hunter Neptune yard
  - 6 October: Trinculo launched at Swan Hunter Hebburn yard for Bowring SS Co Ltd
  - 12 October: Lagoven Quiriquire launched at Swan Hunter Hebburn yard for Lagoven SA, Venezuela
  - 17 October: Desdemona launched at Swan Hunter Hebburn yarad for Bowring SS Co Ltd
  - Swan Hunter was nationalised
- 1978
  - 24 April: Aldrington launched at the Swan Hunter Neptune yard for Stephenson Clarke Shipping
  - 25 April: HMS Exeter, a Type 42 destroyer, launched at Swan Hunter Neptune yard for the Royal Navy
  - 20 July: Pacific Swan launched at the Swan Hunter Hebburn yard for BNFL
  - 16 October: Royal Prince launched at the Swan Hunter Walker yard for Furness Withy
  - 17 October: Crown Prince launched at the Swan Hunter Walker yard for Furness Withy
  - 1 December: HMS Illustrious, a light aircraft carrier, launched by Princess Margaret at Swan Hunter Wallsend yard for the Royal Navy
- 1979
  - 8 November: MS Kopalnia Gottwald launched at Swan Hunter's Hebburn yard for the Polish Steamship Co

=== 1980s ===
- 1980
  - 15 February: Dunedin launched at the Swan Hunter Walker yard for the Shaw, Savill & Albion Line
  - 17 March: Pacific Crane launched at the Swan Hunter Hebburn yard for BNFL
- 1981
  - 2 June: HMS Ark Royal, a light aircraft carrier, launched by the Queen Mother, at Swan Hunter's Wallsend yard for the Royal Navy
  - 1 July: Mediterranean Shearwater launched at Swan Hunter's Hebburn yard for BNFL
  - 12 November: Ingram Osprey launched at the Swan Hunter Walker yard for the Ingram Tanker Co
- 1982
  - 26 April: Pacific Teal launched at the Swan Hunter Hebburn yard for BNFL
  - 21 June: HMS York launched at the Swan Hunter Neptune yard, a Type 42 destroyer for the Royal Navy
  - 16 September: Thorseggen launched at Swan Hunter's Wallsend Yard for Thor Dahl
  - 11 December: Orelia, a diving support vessel, launched at the Swan Hunter Neptune yard for Houlder Offshore
- 1983
  - 18 March: BP Achiever launched at the Swan Hunter Hebburn yard for BP Shipping
  - 6 September: Höegh Duke launched at Swan Hunter's Wallsend yard for Leif Höegh & Co
- 1984
  - 13 June: Pacific Guardian, a cable repair ship, launched at Swan Hunter's Neptune yard for Cable & Wireless plc
  - 12 July: Atlantic Conveyor launched at the Swan Hunter Wallsend yard for the Atlantic Container Line
- 1986
  - 26 March: HMS Sheffield launched at Swan Hunter's Neptune yard for the Royal Navy
  - 8 April: HMS Coventry launched at Swan Hunter's Wallsend Yard for the Royal Navy
  - 13 December: RFA Sir Galahad launched at the Swan Hunter Wallsend yard for the Royal Fleet Auxiliary
- 1987
  - Swan Hunter returned to private ownership as a result of a management buy-out
- 1988
  - 20 January: HMS Chatham, a frigate for the Royal Navy, launched at the Swan Hunter Neptune shipyard and was the final ship to be built at that yard
  - 25 October: Sir Eric Sharp, a cable repair ship, launched at Swan Hunter's Wallsend yard, their 25th cable ship launch, for Cable & Wireless plc
- 1989
  - 21 January: HMS Marlborough launched at the Swan Hunter Wallsend yard for the Royal Navy
  - Swan Hunter's Wallsend yard was the only shipyard on the Tyne still launching ships

=== 1990s ===
- 1990
  - 1 December: RRS James Clark Ross launched at the Swan Hunter Wallsend yard for the British Antarctic Survey
- 1991
  - 1 March: RFA Fort George launched at the Swan Hunter Wallsend yard for the Royal Fleet Auxiliary
- 1992
  - 4 February: HMS Westminster launched at the Swan Hunter Wallsend yard, a Type 23 frigate for the Royal Navy
  - 4 April: HMS Northumberland launched at the Swan Hunter Wallsend yard, a Type 23 frigate for the Royal Navy
- 1993
  - 6 April: HMS Richmond launched at the Swan Hunter Wallsend yard, a Type 23 frigate for the Royal Navy
  - May: Swan Hunter went into receivership with the loss of over 2,000 jobs
  - 2 June: Pride of the Tyne launched at the Swan Hunter Wallsend yard for the Shields Ferry

== See also ==
- History of Tyne and Wear

== Sources ==
- Brown, DK (1995). The Design and Construction of British Warships 1939-1945. London: Conway Maritime Press. ISBN 0851776736.
- Burton, Anthony (1994). The Rise and Fall of British Shipbuilding. London: Constable & Co. ISBN 0-09-472920-4.
- Chesneau, Roger (1992). Aircraft Carriers of the World, 1914 to the Present. An Illustrated Encyclopedia. London: Arms and Armour Press. ISBN 1860198759.
- Clarke, JF (1997). Building Ships on the North East Coast, Part 1: 1640-1914. Whitley Bay: The Bewick Press. ISBN 1-898880-04-2.
- Colls, Robert; Lancaster, Bill (2001). Newcastle upon Tyne. A Modern History. Chichester: Phillimore & Co Ltd. ISBN 1-86077-167-X.
- Cuthbert, Jim; Smith, Ken (2004). Palmers of Jarrow. Newcastle upon Tyne: Tyne Bridge Publishing. ISBN 1857951964.
- Dixon, Conrad (1987). Ships of the Victorian Navy. Southampton: Ashford Press Publishing. ISBN 1-85253-024-3.
- Dougan, David (1968). The History of North East Shipbuilding. London: George Allen & Unwin.
- Elson, Peter (1986). Tyneside Shipbuilding 1920-1960. Newcastle upon Tyne: Newcastle City Libraries. ISBN 0-902653-38-5.
- Flowers, Anna; Histon, Vanessa (1999). Water Under the Bridges, Newcastle's Twentieth Century. Newcastle upon Tyne: Tyne Bridge Publishing. ISBN 1-85795-140-9.
- Harvey, WJ; Turrell, K (1988). Empire Tugs. Kendal: The World Ship Society. ISBN 0-905617-47-9.
- Hepplewhite, Peter (2002). Images of England - Newcastle upon Tyne. Stroud: Tempus Publishing Ltd. ISBN 0 7524 1598 0.
- Johnman, Lewis; Murphy, Hugh (2002). British Shipbuilding and the State since 1918. Exeter: University of Exeter Press. ISBN 0 85989 606 4.
- Middlebrook, Sydney (1968). Newcastle upon Tyne. Its Growth and Achievement. Wakefield: S.R. Publishers ltd.
- Newcastle upon Tyne City Libraries & Arts (1991). Looking back at The Tyne. Newcastle upon Tyne: Newcastle upon Tyne City Libraries & Arts. ISBN 0-902653-39-3.
- Osler, A; Barrow, A (1993). Tall Ships Two Rivers. Newcastle upon Tyne: Keepdate (Publishing) Ltd. ISBN 0-9520494-2-2.
- Smith, Ken (2007). Queens of the Tyne. Newcastle upon Tyne: Tyne Bridge Publishing. ISBN 978-1-85795-113-4.
- Smith, Ken; Rae, Ian (1994). Swans of the Tyne. Newcastle upon Tyne: Newcastle upon Tyne City Libraries & Arts & North Tyneside Libraries. ISBN 1-85795-021-6.
- Smith, Ken; Rae, Ian (1995). Built with Pride: Tyne ships 1969-1994. Newcastle upon Tyne: Newcastle upon Tyne City Libraries & Arts. ISBN 1-85795-091-7.
- Woodcock, Roger (1988). Looking back at Tyne Liners 1900-1962. Newcastle upon Tyne: Newcastle upon Tyne City Libraries & Arts. ISBN 0-902653-59-8.
- Woodcock, Roger (1990). Tyneside Cunarders. Newcastle upon Tyne: Newcastle upon Tyne City Libraries & Arts. ISBN 0-902653-89-X.
