= RFA Gold Rover =

1974 Rover-class small fleet tanker of the Royal Fleet Auxiliary

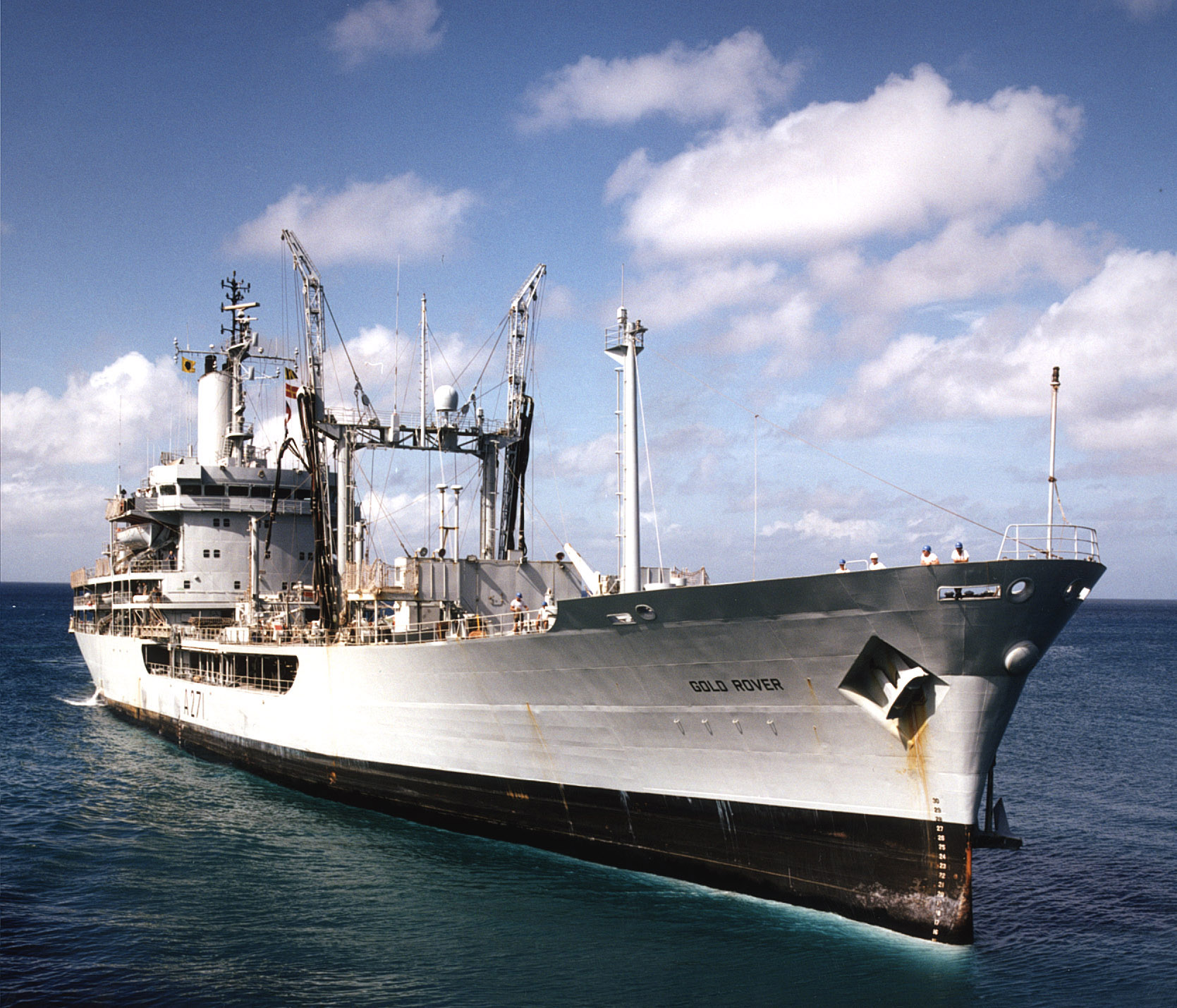
- RFA Gold Rover

History

United Kingdom
- Name: RFA Gold Rover
- Ordered: November 1971
- Builder: Swan Hunter, Tyne and Wear, United Kingdom
- Launched: 7 March 1973
- In service: 22 March 1974
- Out of service: 6 March 2017
- Home port: London
- Identification: IMO number: 7306221; MMSI number: 232502000; Callsign: GRET; Pennant number: A271; Flight deck: GV
- Fate: Scrapped (completely dismantled: 2 December 2019)
- Badge

General characteristics
- Class & type: Rover-class tanker
- Tonnage: 7,574 GRT; 3,256 NRT; 6,799 DWT
- Displacement: 11,520 tons full load
- Length: 461 ft 4 in (140.61 m)
- Beam: 63 ft 2 in (19.25 m)
- Draught: 24 ft 0 in (7.32 m)
- Depth: 33 ft 6 in (10.21 m)
- Propulsion: 2 × SEMT-Pielstick 16 PA 4 diesel engines (post 1974); 15,360 hp (11,450 kW); 1 × shaft; Bow thruster
- Speed: 18 knots (33 km/h; 21 mph)
- Range: 15,000 miles (24,000 km) at 15 knots (28 km/h)
- Endurance: 8,000 nautical miles
- Capacity: 7,460 m^{3} (46,900 bbl) fuel oil; 600 tons aviation fuel; 70 tons lubricating oil; 362 m^{3} (80,000 imp gal) fresh water
- Complement: 16 officers; 31 ratings
- Sensors & processing systems: Sperry Marine Visionmaster radars and ECDIS; 1690 I band navigation radars
- Electronic warfare & decoys: 2 × Corvus and 2 × Plessey Shield decoy launchers; Graseby Type 182 towed torpedo decoy
- Armament: 2 × Oerlikon 20 mm cannon; 2 × 7.62 mm machine guns
- Aircraft carried: one flight spot for a Merlin can take a Chinook
- Aviation facilities: Helicopter deck (no hangar)

RFA Gold Rover (A271) was a Rover-class small fleet tanker of the Royal Fleet Auxiliary (RFA) and one of five ships that were designed by the Admiralty, all of which were built at the Swan Hunter shipyard.

Gold Rover and her sister Black Rover were the last two in service with the RFA on duty around the world. The class was phased out as part of a worldwide effort to replace single-hulled tankers with more environmentally safe double-hulled vessels. Gold Rover herself was decommissioned in a sunset ceremony at Portsmouth Naval Base on 6 March 2017.

== Characteristics ==
Ships of the Rover class were predominantly used to transport fuel, oil, and aviation fuel for services around the globe; they could also carry limited dried stores of 340 tonnes (330 long tons; 370 short tons) such as munitions and refrigerated goods. They were built with a flight deck large enough to accommodate two helicopters, although no hangar was fitted.

== Operational history ==
=== 1974–1980 ===
In July 1974, Gold Rover participated in evacuation duties during the partition of Cyprus during the Turkish invasion of the island.

=== 1981–1990 ===
Gold Rover was in Singapore at the time of the Falklands Conflict in 1982 and therefore took no part in the hostilities.

On 14 November 1984, Gold Rover sailed from Gibraltar on completion of refit, the last RFA to be refitted in HM Dockyard Gibraltar.

Gold Rover participated in the 1986 Jamaican flood relief operations.

On 1 December 1990, Gold Rover lost her rudder in severe weather in the South Atlantic and sent out a distress call. Some of her crew were airlifted off by a Royal Air Force Sea King helicopter of No. 78 Squadron and she managed to get to anchor seventeen miles (27 km) east of Lively island to ride out the storm before she was towed by the tug Oil Mariner to Montevideo for repairs. The crew of the Sea King rescue helicopter, captained by Flt Lt David Kerr-Sheppard, received various awards for outstanding flying skill in such difficult weather conditions.

=== 1991–2000 ===
In January 2000, she was towed back to Devonport by two RMAS tugs after breaking down off Lizard Point.

=== 2001–2010 ===
2006 was a busy year for Gold Rover. She was in Nigeria in June 2006 for the 50th anniversary celebrations of the formation of the Nigerian Navy. As part of the celebrations there was a Fleet Review by President Olusegun Obasanjo. On 6 October she, along with Royal Navy frigate HMS Argyll and Royal Marines from 40 Commando, seized more than two tonnes of cocaine during a major drugs haul off the coast of West Africa. The illegal drugs, which were found in an unregistered vessel, had a UK street value of some £60 million.

Gold Rover was part of a Royal Navy amphibious task group, the VELA Deployment 06, en route to Sierra Leone where she and other ships were taking part in a major amphibious exercise. Whilst on the way to West Africa Gold Rover was contributing to the global fight against terrorism and the Royal Navy's maritime security operations activity.

=== 2011–2017 ===
Gold Rover entered refit in the middle of 2013. Gold Rover departed her home port for her last operational deployment in 2014.

Between 12 and 16 October 2015 Gold Rover and HMS Lancaster participated the bicentennial anniversary commemorations of Napoleon's arrival on Saint Helena after his defeat at the Battle of Waterloo, and subsequent surrender to British forces.

In 2015, she participated in Operation UNITAS.

Gold Rover entered Portsmouth for the final time on 22 February 2017, bowing out after 43 years of active service. On 29 August 2017 the Defence Equipment Sales Authority (DESA) invited expressions of interest from companies interested in receiving an invitation to tender with respect to the proposed sale for the sole purpose of recycling of the former RFA ship.

She was scrapped at Aliağa in September 2019.
