= RFA Green Rover =

1969 Rover-class small fleet tanker of the Royal Fleet Auxiliary

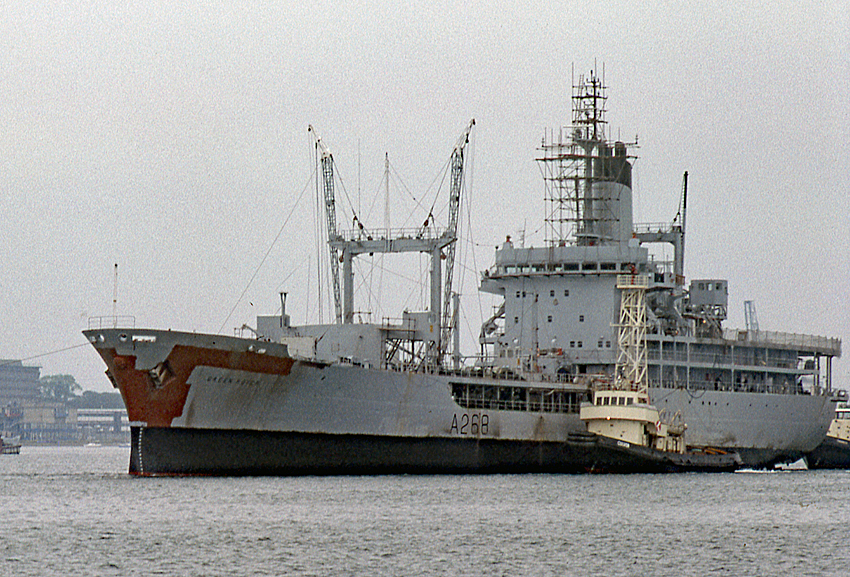
- RFA Green Rover (A268)

History

United Kingdom
- Name: Green Rover
- Ordered: January 1968
- Builder: Swan Hunter
- Yard number: 6
- Laid down: 28 February 1968
- Launched: 19 December 1968
- In service: 15 August 1969
- Out of service: 1992
- Identification: IMO number: 6923034; Pennant number: A268; Callsign: GYXJ; Flight deck: GN
- Fate: Acquired by the Indonesian Navy
- Badge

Indonesia
- Name: Arun
- Namesake: Arun gas field
- Commissioned: 1992
- Identification: IMO number: 6923034; Pennant number: 903
- Status: Active

General characteristics
- Class & type: Rover-class tanker
- Tonnage: 7,503 GRT; 3,186 NRT; 6,822 DWT
- Displacement: 11,520 tons full load
- Length: 461 ft 04 in (140.61 m)
- Beam: 63 ft 02 in (19.25 m)
- Draught: 24 ft 00 in (7.32 m)
- Depth: 33 ft 06 in (10.21 m)
- Propulsion: 2 x 16 cyl Ruston diesel engines (orig); 2 × SEMT-Pielstick 16 PA 4 diesel engines (post 1974); 15,360 hp (11,450 kW); 1 × shaft; Bow thruster
- Speed: 18 knots (33 km/h; 21 mph)
- Range: 15,000 miles (24,000 km) at 15 knots (28 km/h)
- Capacity: 7,460 m^{3} (46,900 bbl) fuel oil; 600 tons aviation fuel; 70 tons lubricating oil; 362 m^{3} (80,000 imp gal) fresh water
- Complement: 16 officers; 31 ratings
- Sensors & processing systems: Sperry Marine Visionmaster radars and ECDIS; 1690 I band navigation radars
- Electronic warfare & decoys: 2 × Corvus and 2 × Plessey Shield decoy launchers; Graseby Type 182 towed torpedo decoy
- Armament: 2 × Oerlikon 20 mm cannon; 2 × 7.62 mm machine guns
- Aircraft carried: one flight spot for a Merlin can take a Chinook
- Aviation facilities: Helicopter deck (no hangar)

RFA Green Rover (A268) was a Rover-class small fleet tanker of the Royal Fleet Auxiliary (RFA), built by Swan Hunter Shipbuilders on the River Tyne, UK and completed in 1969. After decommissioning in 1992 she was sold to the Indonesian Navy and renamed KRI Arun (903).

== Design and construction ==
The Rover-class were single-hulled tankers, designed to carry a mixture of fuel oil, aviation fuel, lubricating oil and fresh water supply for services around the globe; they could also carry limited dried stores of 340 tonnes (330 long tons; 370 short tons) such as munitions and refrigerated goods. They were built with a flight deck large enough to accommodate two helicopters, although no hangar was fitted. Although not big enough to support a large task group, these ships were ideal for supporting individual warships or small groups on deployment.

The keel of Green Rover was laid at Swan Hunter Shipbuilders Ltd's Hebburn yard on the River Tyne, UK on 28 February 1968, she was launched on 19 December the same year, and completed on 15 August 1969.

== Operational history ==
=== Royal Fleet Auxiliary ===
One of Green Rover's first duties was to attend Navy Days at Chatham, between 31 August and 1 September 1969, where she was open to the public and over 13,000 people visited the ship. In the September she towed the disabled RFA Appleleaf from the North Atlantic to HMNB Devonport.

In November 1970 she departed for a deployment to the Far East, returning by September 1971 where she carried out deck landing trials with the new Harrier jump jet while moored at Greenwich Pier on the Thames.

In 1973 she deployed nine times over three months, between 20 June and 22 September, in support of Royal Navy units operating in support of fishing boats from Britain off Iceland during the Second Cod War. After suffering from a major engine failure while operating as Cod War Station Tanker, she returned to Tyneside for the engines to be replaced in October 1973, by June 1974 this was completed, with the original engines being replaced with two 16-cylinder Crossley-Pielstick diesel engines.

On 17 September 1974, Green Rover departed HMNB Devonport to support Task Group 317.2, led by the Tiger-class cruiser HMS Blake, for deployment in the Far East. The task group also included the Leander-class frigates HMS Achilles, HMS Diomede and HMS Leander, the Rothesay-class frigates HMS Falmouth and HMS Lowestoft, the Ol-class "fast fleet tanker" RFA Olna and the fleet stores ship RFA Stromness. Between 29 March and 26 April 1975, Green Rover, along with HMS Achilles and HMS Lowestoft, were ordered to the coast off South Vietnam, to support a small task force in the evacuation of British and Commonwealth citizens, known as Operation Stella.

Green Rover was again involved with the Cod Wars when, between 24 November 1975 and 1 June 1976, she provided support to Royal Navy units during the Third Cod War.

On 26 January 1977 Green Rover left HMNB Devonport with RFA Tidepool and RFA Tarbatness as part of Task Group 317.5, for an Atlantic deployment supporting HMS Tiger, the nuclear-powered fleet submarine HMS Churchill and six units of the 7th Frigate Squadron, until May. She was again present for a Navy Days, this time at HMNB Devonport during Plymouth Navy Days 1977, the year of the Silver Jubilee of Elizabeth II from 27 August.

1978 saw a six and a half month deployment around the Caribbean, Atlantic and Pacific supporting the cruiser HMS Blake, which was the Flagship of Task Group 317.7, along with the Leander-class frigate HMS Juno, RFA Stromness and the Tide-class replenishment oiler RFA Tidespring, departing HMNB Portsmouth on 31 May. It formed up with the Devonport group of the Type 21 frigate HMS Ambuscade, the Leander-class frigates HMS Hermione and HMS Leander, returning to the United Kingdom on 12 December. Notabley she was present off the Virgin Islands with the frigate HMS Juno between 5 - 7 July, due to internal security problems.

In 1980 Green Rover was deployed providing humanitarian relief off the Cayman Islands in the wake of the Category 5 status hurricane, Hurricane Allen, along with the Leander-class frigate HMS Scylla.

She transferred around 1,350 imperial gallons (6,100 L; 1,620 US gal) of fuel to Richard Branson's Virgin Atlantic Challenger in August 1985, while attempting to gain the Blue Riband (unfortunately the vessel overturned short of its target and sank without completing its crossing.).

On 27 May 1988 Green Rover was placed in reserve on 30 days notice and was laid up in No 3 Basin at HMNB Portsmouth.

Green Rover was decommissioned in 1992 from the Royal Fleet Auxiliary.

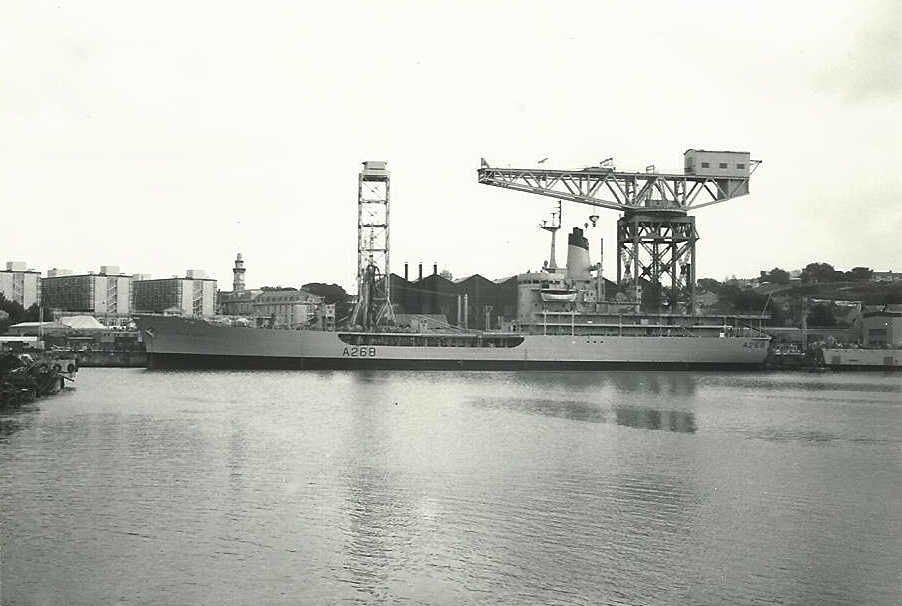
RFA Green Rover at Devonport Dockyard, Plymouth Navy Day, August 1977

=== Indonesian Navy ===
In April 1992 the ship was purchased by her builders who then resold her to the Indonesian Navy for £6 million. She was towed from Portsmouth to the Tyne renamed C to be taken in hand for a four-month refurbishment before re-entering service for her new owners. Commissioned as KRI Arun (903), in addition to providing tanker duties, she also became the flagship of the Training Command in the Indonesian fleet. She is still in service as of 2018.

On 19 March 2018 Arun took on a severe list during a replenishment operation off Ujung, Surabaya. The exercise was cancelled and she was towed to naval facilities at Surabaya for technical examination.

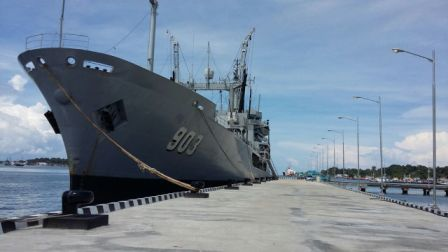
Indonesian Navy oil tanker KRI Arun (903). Ex-RFA Green Rover (A268)

== See also ==
- List of replenishment ships of the Royal Fleet Auxiliary
