= RFA Tidepool =

1963 Tide-class replenishment oiler of the Royal Fleet Auxiliary

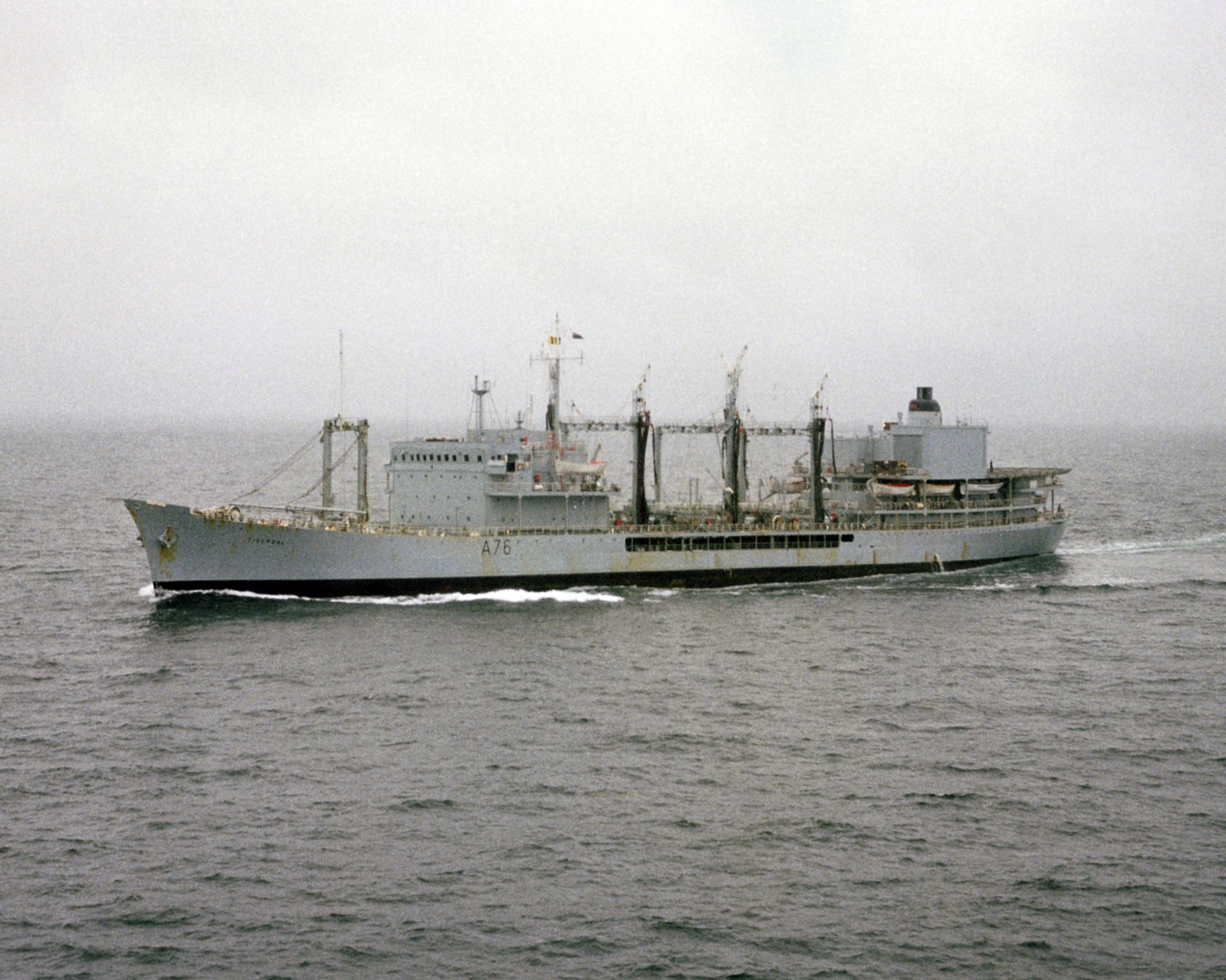

History

United Kingdom
- Name: RFA Tidepool
- Ordered: 28 February 1961
- Builder: Hawthorn Leslie and Company
- Yard number: 753
- Laid down: 4 December 1961
- Launched: 11 December 1962
- In service: 28 June 1963
- Out of service: 13 August 1982
- Identification: IMO number: 5425607; Callsign: GJMB; Pennant number: A76; Deck code: TP
- Fate: Sold to Chile, 1982
- Badge

Chile
- Name: Almirante Jorge Montt
- Namesake: Jorge Montt
- Commissioned: 13 August 1982
- Decommissioned: 15 December 1997
- Identification: IMO number: 5425607

General characteristics
- Class & type: Tide-class replenishment oiler
- Tonnage: 14,130 GRT; 7,411 NRT; 17,400 DWT
- Displacement: 27,400 long tons (27,840 t)
- Length: 583 ft 8 in (177.90 m)
- Beam: 71 ft 3 in (21.72 m)
- Draught: 32 ft 1 in (9.78 m)
- Depth: 40 ft 6 in (12.34 m)
- Installed power: 2 × Foster Wheeler watertube steam boilers; 15,000 shaft horsepower (11,000 kilowatts)
- Propulsion: 2 × Hawthorn Leslie/Pametrada geared turbines, double reduction gearbox; single shaft
- Speed: 17 knots (20 mph; 31 km/h)
- Complement: 110 - plus embarked RN flight party
- Aircraft carried: 3 × Westland Wessex helicopters
- Aviation facilities: Helicopter deck, hangar

Service record
- Operations: Cod War; Beira Patrol; Falklands War

RFA Tidepool (A76) was a Tide-class replenishment oiler of the Royal Fleet Auxiliary.

Tidepool had a long and busy life in the fleet. The ship participated in both the Cod Wars and the Beira Patrol during the 1970s. In 1982 when the Falklands War broke out Tidepool was on its way to Chile to be disposed of. The ship was temporarily reclaimed by the United Kingdom and was finally handed over to the Chilean Navy on 13 August 1982 and renamed Almirante Jorge Montt.

== Design and construction ==
Tidepool had a normal complement consisting of 110 Royal Fleet Auxiliary personnel with provision for up to 24 Royal Navy personnel. She was designed with abeam replenishment at sea rigs, which had automatic tensioning winches and she had an astern fuelling rig. Tidepool was also fitted with a single spot 50 x 70 ft helicopter deck, designed to be capable of handling the Royal Navy Westland Wessex helicopters used at the time. She had hangar facilities for a single helicopter and could support aviation refuelling. The ship was built to carry 9,500 tons of Furnace Fuel Oil, 5,500 tons of diesel oil and 2,000 tons of avcat and the forward hold could take dry cargo.

The construction of Tidepool was carried out by the shipbuilder Hawthorn Leslie, at Hebburn. The ship was laid down on 4 December 1961 and launched twelve months later on 11 December 1962. She displaced, fully loaded, 27,400 tons, was just under 584 ft in overall length and was capable of 17 knots.

== Operational history ==
Tidepool was completed and entered service with the Royal Fleet Auxiliary on 11 December 1962, replacing the fleet support tanker Wave Sovereign.

=== Beira Patrol ===
Along with air stores support ship Reliant and the armament support ship Resurgent, Tidepool was deployed on the Beira Patrol in the Mozambique Channel in March 1966, to enforce United Nations sanctions against Rhodesia. The RFA provided support for initially a Royal Navy aircraft carrier and two frigates. On this deployment Tidepool claimed the record for the longest time in the Mozambique Channel at fifty-three days, and was continuously at sea for eighty-one days.

=== Task Group 317.5 ===
On 25 January 1977 Tidepool left HMNB Devonport as part of Task Group 317.5, for an Atlantic deployment led by the Royal Navy's converted helicopter cruiser Tiger, in the company of the RFA's small fleet tanker Green Rover and the fleet stores ship Tarbatness. She returned to the United Kingdom in May.

=== Task Group 317.6 ===
On 5 September 1977, along with RFA's small fleet tanker Grey Rover, the ammunition, explosives and stores supply ship Regent and the fleet stores ship Tarbatness, Tidepool departed HMNB Portsmouth involved in Task Group 317.7, again supporting the helicopter cruiser Tiger, the task group's flagship, and accompanied by the Royal Navy's Rothesay-class frigate Rhyl. The deployment was for seven and half months, and covered Australia and the Far East. She returned to the United Kingdom on 20 April 1978.

=== Falklands War ===
By early 1982 with the 1981 Defence White Paper cuts looming large over the Royal Navy, Tidepool was sold to the Chilean Navy. On its way to Chile, however, the Argentine invasion of the Falkland Islands prompted the Chilean government to offer the return of Tidepool for the conflict against its strategic foe. Admiral John Fieldhouse promptly requested the pursuing of this endeavour "with utmost vigour," and on 3 April 1982 Tidepool was authorized by the Chileans to sail back through the Panana Canal to join the British Task Force.

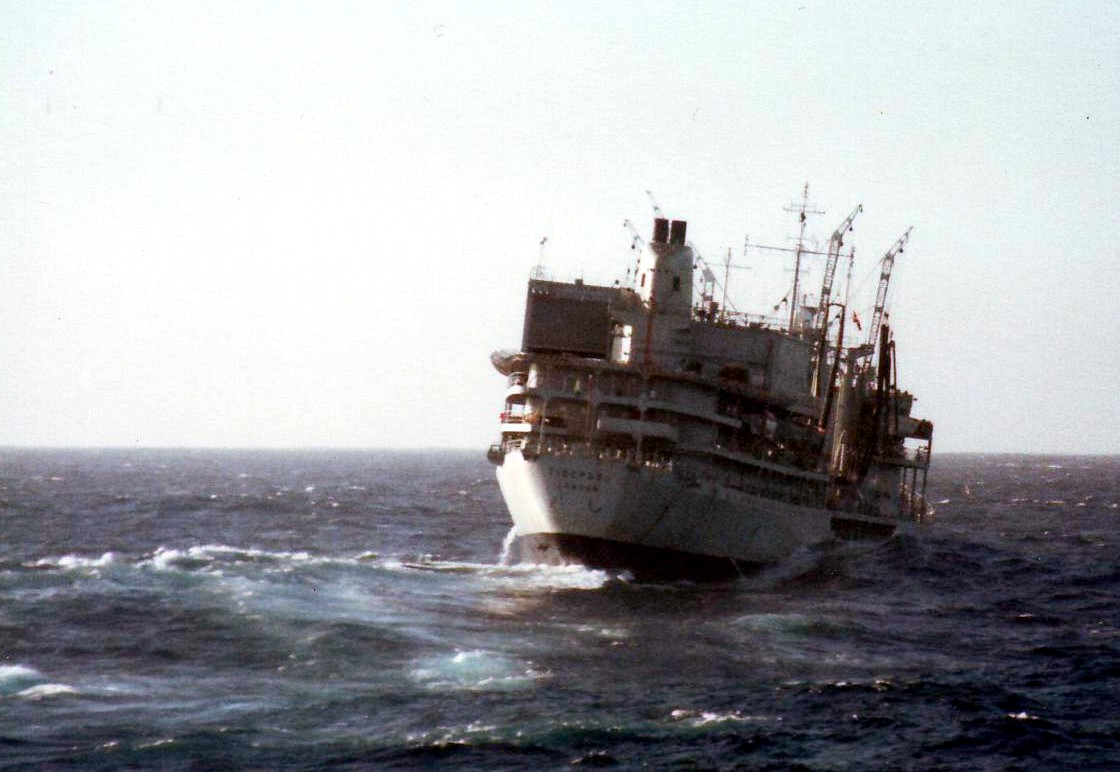
RFA Tidepool in the Total Exclusion Zone, May 1982.
