= SS Empire Cameron =

World War II cargo ship of the United Kingdom

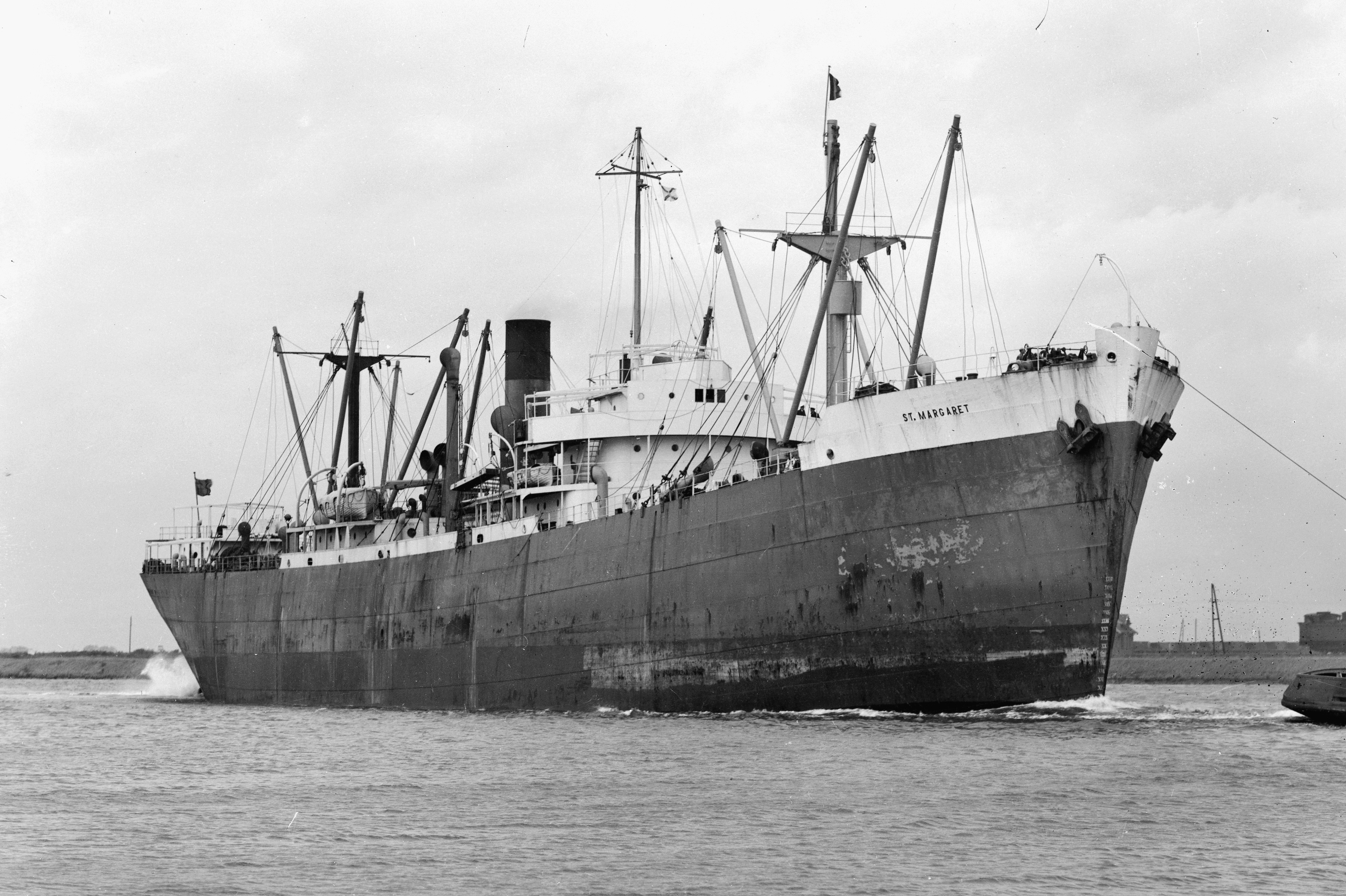
- St. Margaret in Antwerp

History
- Name: 1941: Empire Cameron; 1946: St. Margaret; 1960: Agna
- Owner: 1941: Ministry of War Transport; 1946: Shakespear Shipping Co Ltd; 1951: South American Saint Line Ltd; 1960: Agna Cia Naviera SA
- Operator: 1941: Strick Line; 1943: Shakespear Shipping Co Ltd; 1946: South American Saint Line Ltd; 1960: Tharros Shipping Co Ltd
- Port of registry: 1941: (United Kingdom) Glasgow; 1946: (United Kingdom) Newport; 1960: (Lebanon) Beirut
- Builder: Wm Denny & Bros, Dumbarton
- Yard number: 1358
- Launched: 19 November 1941
- Completed: December 1941
- Identification: UK official number 169447; 1941: call sign BCRW; by 1948: call sign MASN
- Fate: Scrapped in Japan, 1963

General characteristics
- Type: cargo ship
- Tonnage: 7,015 GRT, 5,175 NRT, 9,207 DWT
- Length: 448 ft 6 in (136.70 m) overall; 432.2 ft (131.7 m) registered
- Beam: 56.3 ft (17.2 m)
- Draught: 24 ft 9 in (7.54 m) summer
- Depth: 34.2 ft (10.4 m)
- Decks: 2
- Installed power: triple-expansion engine; 320 NHP
- Propulsion: 1 × screw
- Speed: 9.5 knots (18 km/h)
- Sensors & processing systems: as built: wireless direction finding; by 1951: as above, plus echo sounding device & gyrocompass
- Armament: as built: DEMS
- Notes: sister ship: Empire Guinevere

SS Empire Cameron was a cargo steamship. She was built in Scotland in 1941 for the UK Ministry of War Transport (MoWT). In 1946, South American Saint Line bought her and renamed her St. Margaret. In 1963, Lebanese owners bought her and renamed her Agna. She was scrapped in Japan in 1963.

== Building ==
William Denny and Brothers in Dumbarton built the ship as yard number 1358. She was launched on 19 November 1941, and completed that December as Empire Cameron. She was followed by a sister ship, Empire Guinevere, which Denny's launched in May 1942, and completed that June.

Her lengths were 448 ft 6 in (136.70 m) overall and 432.2 ft (131.7 m) registered. Her beam was 56.3 ft (17.2 m); her depth was 34.2 ft (10.4 m); and her summer draught was 24 ft 9 in (7.54 m). Her tonnages were 7,015 GRT, 5,175 NRT, and 9,207 DWT.

She had a single screw, driven by a three-cylinder triple-expansion engine built by John G. Kincaid & Company of Greenock. It was rated at 320 NHP, and gave her a speed of 9.5 knots (18 km/h). Her navigation equipment included wireless direction finding.

== Empire Cameron ==
The MoWT registered Empire Cameron at Glasgow. Her UK official number was 169447, and her call sign was BCRW. The MoWT appointed FC Strick & Co, Ltd to manage her. By 1943, the MoWT had transferred her to the management of the Shakespear Shipping Co, Ltd.

Between February and May 1942, Empire Cameron sailed from the UK to Gibraltar and Lisbon and back. In June 1942, she sailed via the Cape Cod Canal to New York and Philadelphia. She returned via Boston with a cargo of steel and cotton; and joined Convoy HX 198 at Halifax, Nova Scotia; reaching Belfast Lough on 23 July.

In August 1942, Empire Cameron sailed to Gold Coast with a cargo of 38 Hawker Hurricane fighters; five Bristol Blenheim bombers; and one Spitfire Vb. She sailed with Convoy OS 37 as far as Freetown, Sierra Leone; and continued independently to Takoradi, where she arrived on 15 September. She returned with a cargo of manganese and rubber; joined Convoy SL 123 at Freetown; and reached Middlesbrough on 19 October.

From November 1942, Empire Cameron sailed in support of Operation Torch, and the subsequent Allied occupation of French North Africa. She sailed to Bône (now Annaba) in French Algeria with Convoy KMS 4G in November 1942, and again with Convoy KMS 8G in January 1943; and she sailed to Philppeville (now Skikda) with Convoy KMS 12G in March 1942.

In July 1943, Empire Cameron sailed to Sydney, Nova Scotia via Convoy ONS 12. She returned carrying a cargo of steel and timber via Convoy SC 140, and reached the River Tyne on 7 September.

In October 1943, Empire Cameron sailed via Convoys KMS 30G and KMS 30 to Augusta, Sicily. She spent the next few months working between Brindisi; Tunis; Naples; Bizerte; Bougie (now Béjaïa); Bari; Alexandria; Taranto; and Oran. She returned via Convoy SL 157MK, and reached Hull on 26 May 1944.

From June 1944, Empire Cameron brought timber from Canada to Britain. She sailed to Halifax via Convoy ON 242; loaded timber; returned with Convoy HX 301; and reached Hartlepool on 12 August. She sailed to Sydney, Nova Scotia with Convoy ON 255; returned with Convoy SC 160; and reached Hartlepool on 20 November.

By 2 March 1945, Empire Cameron was at The Downs off the coast of Kent. She sailed with Convoys OS 114KM and KMS 88G as far as Gibraltar, and then via the Suez Canal to Colombo in Ceylon. She crossed the Indian Ocean to Lourenço Marques (now Maputo) in Mozambique, and in July 1945 came back through the Suez Canal to Taranto. She called at Bari; Ancona; and Alexandria, then sailed through the Suez Canal to Massawa and Lourenço Marques. In November 1945 she came back through the Suez Canal, and called at Alexandria. She returned via Malta to Liverpool, where she arrived on 17 December.

== St. Margaret and Agna ==
In 1946, the Shakespear Shipping Co Ltd bought Empire Cameron; renamed her St. Margaret; registered her in Newport; and made the South American Saint Line her managers. By 1948, her call sign was MASN. By 1951, her navigation equipment included an echo sounding device and a gyrocompass.

In 1960, Agna Compañía Naviera SA bought her; renamed her Agna; registered her in Beirut; and Tharros Shipping Co Ltd became her managers. In 1963 she was sold for scrap. On 16 July she reached Yawata, Kyoto. On 15 November she moved to Hirao, where she was broken up.

== Bibliography ==
- Belt, JEB; Appleyard, HS (1996). A History of Frank C. Strick and his many shipping enterprises. Kendal: World Ship Society. ISBN 0-905617-81-9.
- Lloyd's Register of Shipping (PDF). Vol. II.–Steamers and Motorships of 300 tons. London: Lloyd's Register of Shipping. 1942 – via Southampton City Council.
- Lloyd's Register of Shipping (PDF). Vol. II.–Steamers and Motorships of 300 tons Gross and Over. London: Lloyd's Register of Shipping. 1943 – via Southampton City Council.
- Lloyd's Register of Shipping. Vol. II.–Steamers and Motorships of 300 tons Gross and Over. London: Lloyd's Register of Shipping. 1947 – via Internet Archive.
- Lloyd's Register of Shipping. Vol. II. M–Z Steamers, Motorships, Sailing Vessels, &c. London: Lloyd's Register of Shipping. 1948 – via Internet Archive.
- Lloyd's Register of Shipping. Vol. II. M–Z. London: Lloyd's Register of Shipping. 1951 – via Internet Archive.
- Mitchell, WH; Sawyer, LA (1995). The Empire Ships. London, New York, Hamburg, Hong Kong: Lloyd's of London Press Ltd. ISBN 1-85044-275-4.
- Register Book. Vol. I.–Register of Ships. London: Lloyd's Register of Shipping. 1955 – via Internet Archive.
