= NRP Bérrio =

1970 Rover-class small fleet tanker of the Royal Fleet Auxiliary and Portuguese Navy

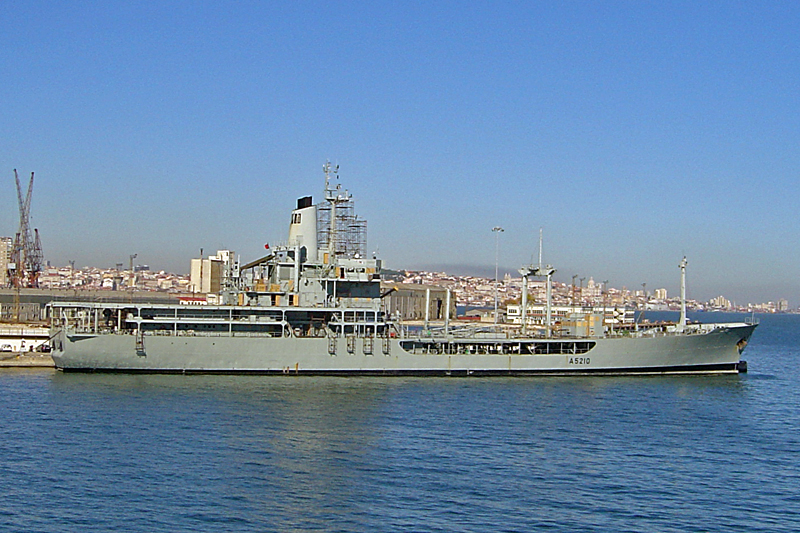
- NRP Bérrio, 2007.

History

United Kingdom
- Name: Blue Rover
- Ordered: January 1968
- Builder: Swan Hunter
- Yard number: 8
- Laid down: 30 December 1968
- Launched: 11 November 1969
- In service: 15 July 1970
- Out of service: 23 February 1993
- Identification: IMO number: 7002409; Pennant number: A270; Callsign: GYXS; Flight deck: BE
- Honours and awards: Falkland Islands 1982
- Fate: Purchased by the Portuguese Navy and renamed NRP Bérrio on 31 March 1993
- Badge

Portugal
- Name: NRP Bérrio
- Namesake: Caravel Bérrio
- Acquired: 31 March 1993
- Home port: Lisbon Naval Base
- Identification: IMO number: 7002409; MMSI number: 263130000; Callsign: CTEA; Hull number: A5210
- Status: Decommissioned

General characteristics
- Class & type: Rover-class tanker
- Tonnage: 7,511 GRT; 3,186 NRT; 7,060 DWT
- Displacement: 11,522 tons full load
- Length: 461 ft 4 in (140.61 m)
- Beam: 63 ft 2 in (19.25 m)
- Draught: 24 ft 0 in (7.32 m)
- Depth: 33 ft 6 in (10.21 m)
- Propulsion: 2 x 16 cyl Ruston diesel engines (orig); 2 × SEMT-Pielstick 16 PA 4 diesel engines (post 1973); 1 × shaft; Bow thruster; 15,360 hp (11,450 kW)
- Speed: 18 knots (33 km/h; 21 mph)
- Range: 15,000 miles (24,000 km) at 15 knots (28 km/h)
- Capacity: 7,460 m^{3} (46,900 bbl) fuel oil; 600 tons aviation fuel; 70 tons lubricating oil; 362 m^{3} (80,000 imp gal) fresh water
- Complement: 16 officers; 31 ratings
- Sensors & processing systems: Sperry Marine Visionmaster radars and ECDIS; 1690 I band navigation radars
- Electronic warfare & decoys: 2 × Corvus and 2 × Plessey Shield decoy launchers; Graseby Type 182 towed torpedo decoy
- Armament: 2 × Oerlikon 20 mm cannon; 2 × 7.62 mm machine guns
- Aircraft carried: one flight spot for a Super Lynx Mk.95 in Portuguese service and Westland Sea King in RFA service
- Aviation facilities: Helicopter deck (no hangar)

NRP Bérrio (A5210) was a fleet support tanker of the Portuguese Navy. She was built by Swan Hunter in 1969 at Hebburn, England as RFA Blue Rover (A270) of the Rover-class and from 1970 to 1993 was part of the British Royal Fleet Auxiliary. In 1982 during her British service she participated in the Falklands War.

In 1993, she was sold to the Portuguese Navy who renamed her Bérrio. She participated in Operation Crocodile (Operação Crocodilo) in 1998, as part of the Portuguese naval task force that rescued foreign nationals caught up in the civil conflicts in Guinea-Bissau and then supported the mediators of the Community of Portuguese Language Countries in the peace talks between the parties in the conflict.

The vessel was decommissioned on 1 June 2020.

== Design and construction ==
RFA Blue Rover, later NRP Bérrio, was a single-hulled tanker of the Rover-class, although not big enough to support a large task group, she was ideal for supporting individual warships or small groups on deployment.

She was designed to carry a mixture of fuel oil, aviation fuel, lubricating oil and a fresh water supply; she could also carry 340 tonnes (330 long tons; 370 short tons) of limited dried stores, such as munitions and refrigerated goods.

She was fitted with a flight deck large enough to accommodate two helicopters, although she had no hangar.

The keel of Blue Rover was laid at Swan Hunter's Hebburn yard on the River Tyne, England, on 30 December 1968, she was launched on 11 November 1969. A fire in a fuel tank which was under construction was the cause of death of two plumbers, Lawrence Burdis (aged 24) and John Kinkaid (aged 21), on 9 March 1970. It took thirty firefighters two hours to extinguish it. She commissioned on 15 July 1970. She was in service with the Royal Fleet Auxiliary from 1970 until 1993.

== Operational history ==
=== Royal Fleet Auxiliary ===
One of Blue Rover's early major deployments came in February 1971 when she supported the Royal Yacht, HMY Britannia in the Pacific Ocean. On 23 February she visited the Pitcairn Islands in support of the visit of Prince Philip, Duke of Edinburgh to the island.

In August 1972 Blue Rover was involved in "Project Stornoway". RAF Stornoway, on the Isle of Lewis, in the Western Isles of Scotland, had fuelling tanks which required 1,500 tonnes (1,500 long tons; 1,700 short tons) of Avtur in readiness for a NATO exercise. She was anchored offshore and delivered the fuel through a specially constructed 2.5 miles (4.0 km) long pipeline in a 22½ hour long operation.

By March 1973 the refit to change unreliable original 16,000 shp diesel engines was completed, being replaced with two 16-cylinder Crossley-Pielstick diesel engines.

May 1973 saw Blue Rover deployed in support of Royal Navy units off Iceland during the Second Cod War until June, and then again during September and October. In December she again visited the Pitcairn Islands, in the Pacific, however, she had a fire in the engine room while again supporting the Royal Yacht. HMY Britannia towed Blue Rover to Tahiti, the largest island of the Windward group, enabling temporary repairs prior to returning to the UK.

She had a busy summer / autumn in 1978, initially she was open to the public during Portsmouth Navy Days over 26, 27 and 28 August and over 20,000 people came onboard during. The following month when the head cook signed off his replacement refused to sign on. The second cook took over, but then he threatened to leave upon Blue Rover's arrival at Faslane, on the Gare Loch, Scotland. Then for the remainder of September she worked with the unique American submarine NR-1, a United States Navy (USN) nuclear-powered ocean engineering and research submarine, in the Irish Sea.

In November 1980, together with the Leaf-class support tanker RFA Brambleleaf, she deployed on the Armilla Patrol supporting the County-class destroyer HMS Antrim and the Leander-class frigate HMS Naiad.

On 16 April 1982 Blue Rover departed HMNB Portsmouth for the South Atlantic as an aviation fuel tanker during Operation Corporate. She arrived and then departed from Ascension Island on 26 April, entering the Total Exclusion Zone (TEZ) around the Falkland Islands on 2 May. She joined with the Tide-class replenishment oiler RFA Tidespring and the Leaf-class replenishment oiler RFA Appleleaf and this group was escorted by the County-class destroyer HMS Antrim and the Rothesay-class frigate HMS Plymouth on 4 May, before heading for the island of South Georgia, around 1,400 kilometres (870 mi) east of the Falkland Islands, to act as the Station Tanker.

On 18 November 1983, in Operation Offcut, Blue Rover was deployed off Lebanon to assist British troops and civilians. She was ordered to stand off Beirut to support the County-class destroyer HMS Glamorgan and the Type 22 frigate HMS Brazen, along with sister ship RFA Grey Rover, the Leaf-class support tanker RFA Brambleleaf and the helicopter support ship RFA Reliant.

== Decommissioning and sale ==
On 9 February 1993 she arrived at HMNB Devonport to remove supplies ready for her disposal. On 22 February she sailed for HMNB Portsmouth, arriving the following day. In March 1993 she was sold for £5.5m to the Portuguese Navy and on 31 March she was officially handed over, at Portsmouth.

== Battle honours ==
On 17 August 1984 RFA Blue Rover received her Falklands Islands 1982 Battle honour by Mr A. Kemp Director Ships and Fuel (DST (SF)).
