= Rover-class tanker =

Class of five small fleet tankers of the Royal Fleet Auxiliary

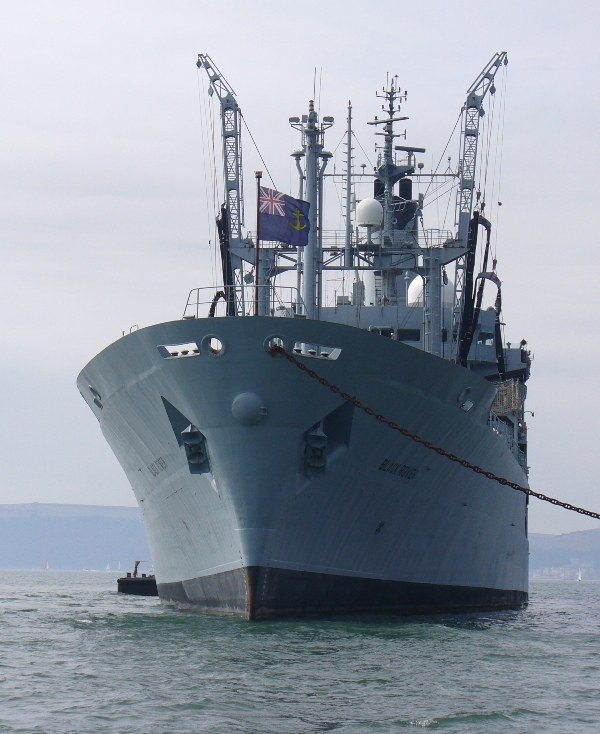
- RFA Black Rover in Plymouth 2005

Class overview
- Builders: Swan Hunter
- Operators: Royal Fleet Auxiliary; Indonesian Navy; Portuguese Navy
- Preceded by: Dale class
- Succeeded by: Tide class
- Built: 1968–1974
- In commission: 1970–2017 (RFA)
- Completed: 5
- Active: 1
- Retired: 4

General characteristics
- Type: Tanker
- Tonnage: 6,692 t DWT
- Displacement: 16,160 t (15,900 long tons)
- Length: 461 ft (141 m)
- Beam: 63 ft (19 m)
- Draught: 24 ft (7.3 m)
- Propulsion: 2 × SEMT-Pielstick 16 PA 4 diesel engines; 1 × shaft; Bow thruster; 15,360 hp (11,450 kW)
- Speed: 18 knots (33 km/h; 21 mph)
- Range: 15,000 nmi (28,000 km; 17,000 mi) at 15 kn (28 km/h; 17 mph)
- Capacity: 3,000 m^{3} (19,000 bbl) of fuel
- Complement: 16 officers; 31 ratings
- Sensors & processing systems: Sperry Marine Visionmaster radars and ECDIS. 1690 I band navigation radars
- Electronic warfare & decoys: 2 × Corvus and 2 × Plessey Shield decoy launchers; Graseby Type 182 towed torpedo decoy
- Armament: 2 × Oerlikon 20 mm cannon; 2 × 7.62 mm machine guns
- Aviation facilities: Helicopter deck (no hangar)

The Rover class is a British ship class of five small fleet tankers, active from 1970 to 2017 with the Royal Fleet Auxiliary (RFA), the naval auxiliary fleet of the United Kingdom. One remains in service, having been sold to Indonesia; the rest have been scrapped or are awaiting disposal, including the one sold to Portugal. They are tasked with the replenishment at sea (RAS) of naval warships with fuel oils and with limited supplies of other naval stores. For RAS tasking, they can refuel a vessel on either beam and a third trailing astern and have a large flight deck to allow vertical replenishment with helicopters.

== History ==
Tenders for what became five ships were invited in 1967. Problems with the original propulsion led to the first three of the class being re-engined in 1974. The final two had minor changes including improved accommodation and different stern anchor arrangements. Blue Rover suffered a fire during construction in 1970 which killed two shipyard workers. Costs ranged from £3m for Green Rover to £7.7m for Gold Rover, last of the class.

== Design ==
The Rover class are a 461 feet (141 m) long, displacement 16,160 t, design of small fleet tanker, intended to operate with frigates or small fleet units.

For propulsion the first three vessels of the class, Green Rover, Grey Rover and Blue Rover, were powered by two 16-cylinder Ruston & Hornsby diesel engines capable of 16,000 bhp (12,000 kW). The choice of engine was a political one and they were found to be problematic with vibration issues.

These ships were all designed to replenish warships underway with diesel, aviation fuel, lubricating oil and fresh water. They can also supply a limited amount of dry and refrigerated stores. Situated in their middle, each ship was equipped with a single fuel replenishment gantry which supported a pair of abeam replenishment cranes. The ship could also supply fuels via stern hoses.

Additionally, to facilitate VERTREP (vertical replenishment) operations, the Rover-class tankers also had a helicopter flight deck which was located behind the accommodation structure and they were fitted with an aircraft refuelling facility, but the vessels had no aircraft hangar available.

The Rover-class tankers were launched in two batches; Green Rover, Grey Rover and Blue Rover were ordered in January 1968 with Gold Rover and Black Rover being ordered in November 1971 and differed slightly from the earlier batch. Following the issues with the Ruston & Hornsby diesel engines fitted to the earlier three, these were replaced with two 16-cylinder Crossley-Pielstick diesel engines capable of 15,382 bhp (11,470 kW). Swapping out was completed in March 1973 for Blue Rover, in June 1974 for Green Rover, and September 1975 for Grey Rover. Gold Rover and Black Rover were fitted with two 16-cylinder Crossley-Pielstick diesel engines capable of 15,360 bhp (11,450 kW), from the outset.

Name	Gross register tonnage	Net register tonnage	Deadweight tonnage	Displacement (full load) tonnage
Green Rover	7,503	3,186	6,822	11,520
Grey Rover	7,509	3,185	6,822	11,520
Blue Rover	7,511	3,186	7,060	11,520
Gold Rover	7,574	3,256	6,799	11,520
Black Rover	7,574	3,256	6,799	11,522

== Ships ==
=== Royal Fleet Auxiliary ===
Name	Pennant	Builder	Laid down	Launched	Commissioned	Fate
Green Rover	A268	Swan Hunter, Hebburn	28 February 1968	19 December 1968	15 August 1969	To Indonesian Navy 1992
Grey Rover	A269	Swan Hunter, Hebburn	28 February 1968	17 April 1969	10 April 1970	Scrapped 2010
Blue Rover	A270	Swan Hunter, Hebburn	30 December 1968	11 November 1969	15 July 1970	To Portuguese Navy 1993 as Berrio
Gold Rover	A271	Swan Hunter, Wallsend	-	7 March 1973	22 March 1974	Scrapped 2019
Black Rover	A273	Swan Hunter, Wallsend	-	30 August 1973	23 August 1974	Scrapped 2020

=== Indonesian Navy ===
Name	Acquired	In service	Out of service	Notes
KRI Arun (903) (ex-Green Rover)	7 April 1992	September 1992		In active service

=== Portuguese Navy ===
Name	Acquired	In service	Out of service	Notes
NRP Bérrio (A5210) (ex-Blue Rover)	31 March 1993		1 June 2020	decommissioned

== Gallery ==
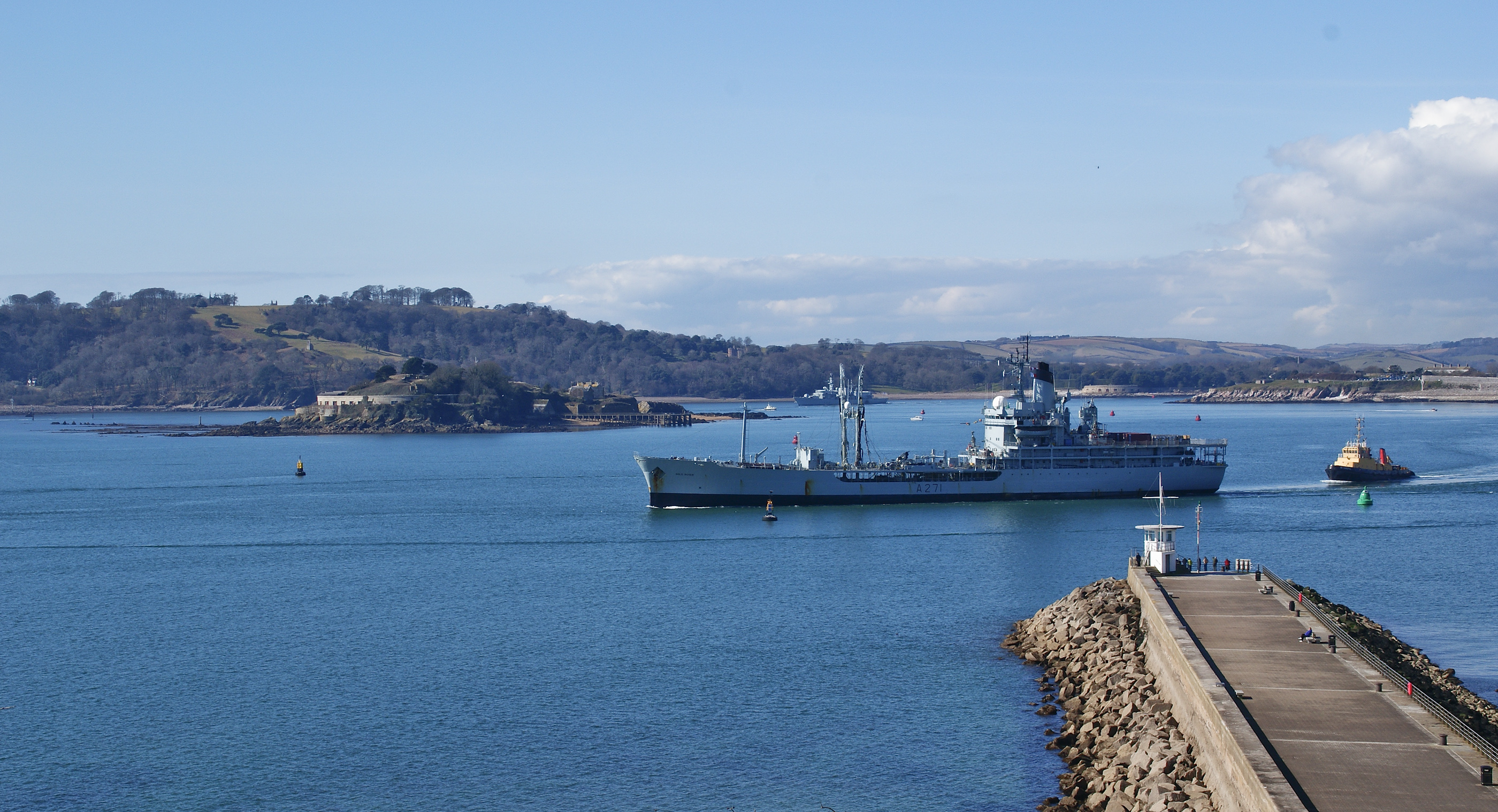
RFA Gold Rover leaving Plymouth Sound in March 2010

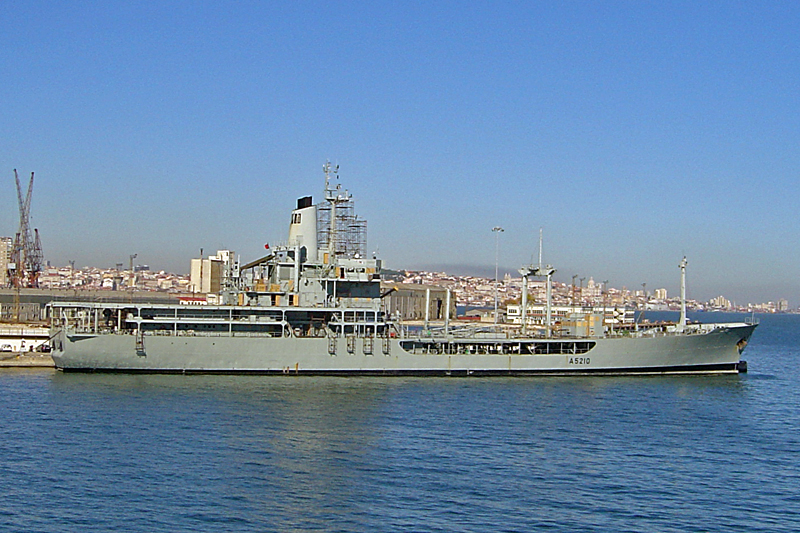
NRP Bérrio, 2007 (ex RFA Blue Rover)

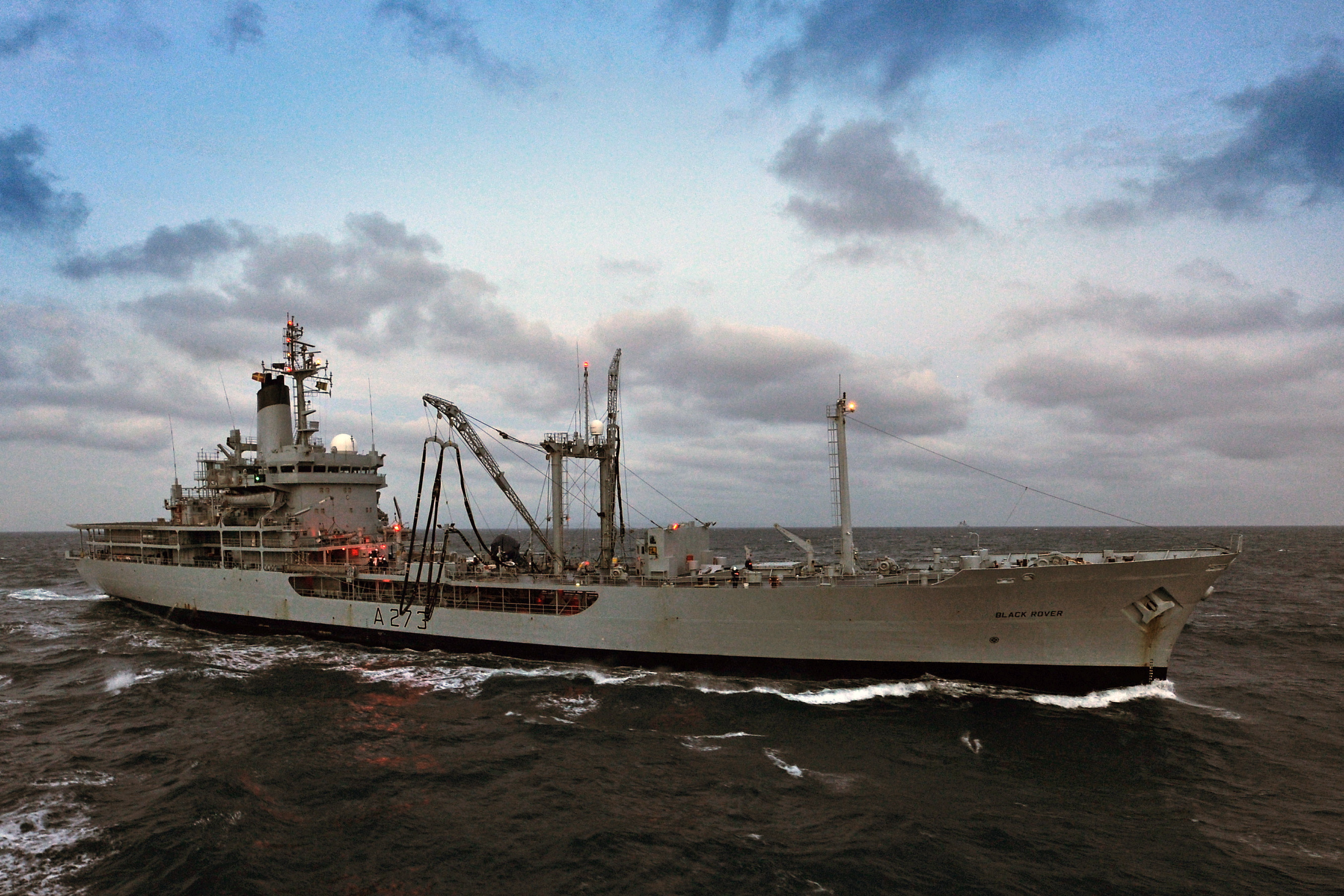
RFA Black Rover in the South Western Approaches of the English Channel

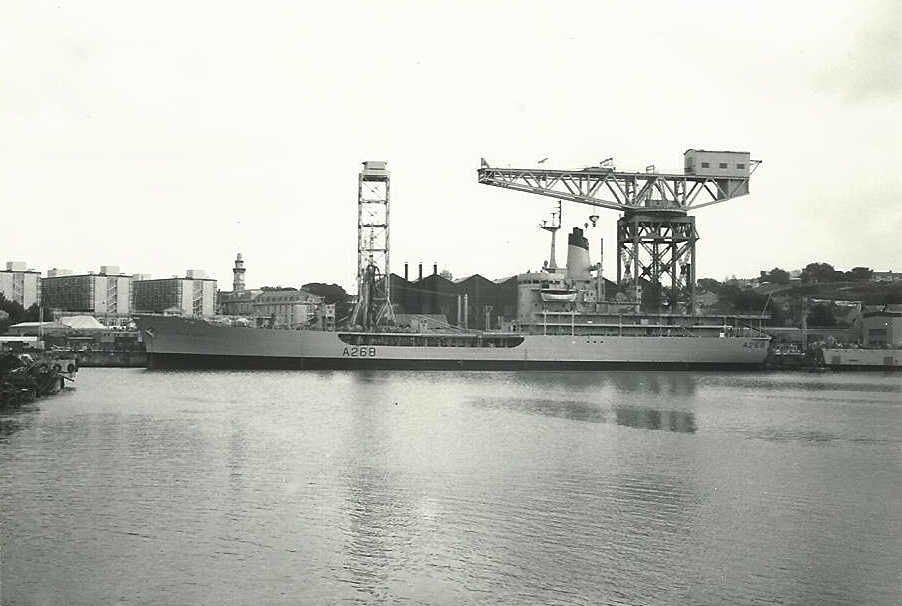
RFA Green Rover, at Devonport Dockyard, Plymouth Navy Day, August 1977

== See also ==
- List of replenishment ships of the Royal Fleet Auxiliary

== Bibliography ==
- Warships of the Royal Navy, Captain John E. Moore RN, Jane's Publishing, 1979, ISBN 0-531-03730-4
- Britain's Modern Royal Navy, Paul Beaver, Patrick Stephens Limited, 1996, ISBN 1-85260-442-5
- Puddefoot, Geoff (2009). The Fourth Force The Untold Story of the Royal Fleet Auxiliary since 1945. Barnsley, South Yorkshire, UK: Seaforth Publishing. ISBN 978-1-84832-046-8.
