= Paul Lester (businessman) =

British businessman (born 1949)

Paul John Lester CBE (born 20 September 1949) is a British businessman who is chairman of McCarthy & Stone, and Essentra. Lester is also chairman of Readypower, Marley, Signia, FirstPort and Appello.

== Biography ==
Lester graduated from Trent Polytechnic with a BSc in Mechanical Engineering and a Diploma in Management Studies. He was CEO of Graseby from 1990 to 1997 and CEO of VT Group from 2002 to 2010. He has held chairmanships at A&P Group, Marine Current Turbines, Survitec Group, John Laing Infrastructure Fund, Forterra and Greenergy. He was president of EEF from 2000 to 2003, and of the Business Services Association from 2004 to 2007. He has been a member of the UK Government Major Projects Review Group since 2005.
