= RFA Black Rover =

1974 Rover-class small fleet tanker of the Royal Fleet Auxiliary

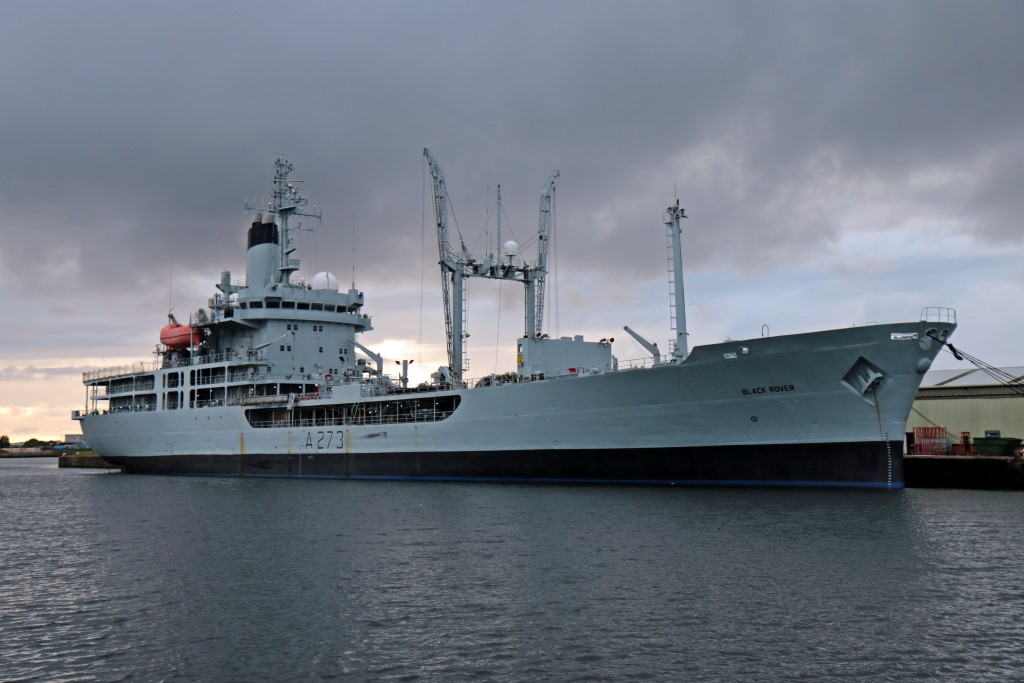
- RFA Black Rover at West Float, Birkenhead, in May 2016

History

United Kingdom
- Name: RFA Black Rover
- Operator: Royal Fleet Auxiliary
- Builder: Swan Hunter, Tyne and Wear, United Kingdom
- Launched: 30 October 1973
- In service: 23 August 1974
- Out of service: 17 March 2017
- Identification: IMO number: 7329338; MMSI number: 232427000; Callsign: GREU; Pennant number: A273; Flight deck: BV
- Fate: Scrapped (completely dismantled: 20 January 2020)
- Badge

General characteristics
- Class & type: Rover-class tanker
- Tonnage: 7,574 GRT; 3,256 NRT; 6,799 DWT
- Displacement: 11,522 tons full load
- Length: 461 ft 4 in (140.61 m)
- Beam: 63 ft 2 in (19.25 m)
- Draught: 24 ft 0 in (7.32 m)
- Depth: 33 ft 6 in (10.21 m)
- Installed power: 15,360 hp (11,450 kW)
- Propulsion: 2 × SEMT-Pielstick 16 PA 4 diesel engines (post 1974); 1 × shaft; Bow thruster
- Speed: 18 knots (33 km/h; 21 mph)
- Range: 15,000 miles (24,000 km) at 15 knots (28 km/h)
- Endurance: 8,000 nautical miles
- Capacity: 7,460 m^{3} (46,900 bbl) fuel oil; 600 tons aviation fuel; 70 tons lubricating oil; 362 m^{3} (80,000 imp gal) fresh water
- Complement: 16 officers; 31 ratings
- Sensors & processing systems: Sperry Marine Visionmaster radars and ECDIS; 1690 I band navigation radars
- Electronic warfare & decoys: 2 × Corvus and 2 × Plessey Shield decoy launchers; Graseby Type 182 towed torpedo decoy
- Armament: 2 x 20mm Oerlikon cannon; 4 x 7.62 mm machine guns; 2 x Dillon Aero 7.62 mm miniguns
- Aircraft carried: one flight spot for a Merlin can take a Chinook
- Aviation facilities: Helicopter deck (no hangar)

RFA Black Rover was a Rover-class small fleet tanker of the Royal Fleet Auxiliary (RFA). She was designed to replenish ships underway at sea with fuel, fresh water, and stores in all weather conditions. She had a helicopter deck served by a stores lift and was capable of conducting helicopter replenishment. Displacing 16,160 tonnes, she was powered by twin diesels and has a ship's company of 60.

== History ==
Black Rover was launched by Swan Hunter on 30 August 1973 and was accepted into service the following year. She was in refit in Rosyth during the Falklands Conflict and took no part in the efforts to liberate the islands.

Black Rover was deployed from UK in June 2005 and its tasking included assisting with post-tsunami reconstruction and participation in multi-national exercises in the Far East as the UK's component of the Five Power Defence Arrangement.

In 2006 she was the Flag Officer Sea Training (FOST) tanker, and in September she hosted the RFA recruitment video film crew. Her role as FOST tanker allowed the film makers to capture many of the RFA's capabilities. The busy nature of the FOST schedule allowed the film crew to experience a wide variety of exercises and evolutions during their time on board.

In 2013, Black Rover deployed to the Falkland Islands and South Georgia.

Black Rover was scheduled to decommission in 2016 however she never returned to sea under her own power after docking in Birkenhead in September 2015.

== Disposal ==
In March 2017, after 18 months alongside in Birkenhead, Black Rover was towed to Portsmouth. On 29 August 2017 the Defence Equipment Sales Authority (DESA) invited expressions of interest from companies interested in receiving an invitation to tender in respect to the proposed sale for the sole purpose of recycling of the former RFA ship. She departed Portsmouth under tow on 11 August and arrived at Aliaga on 1 September 2019. Scrapping was completed on 20 January 2020.
