= HMCS Okanagan =

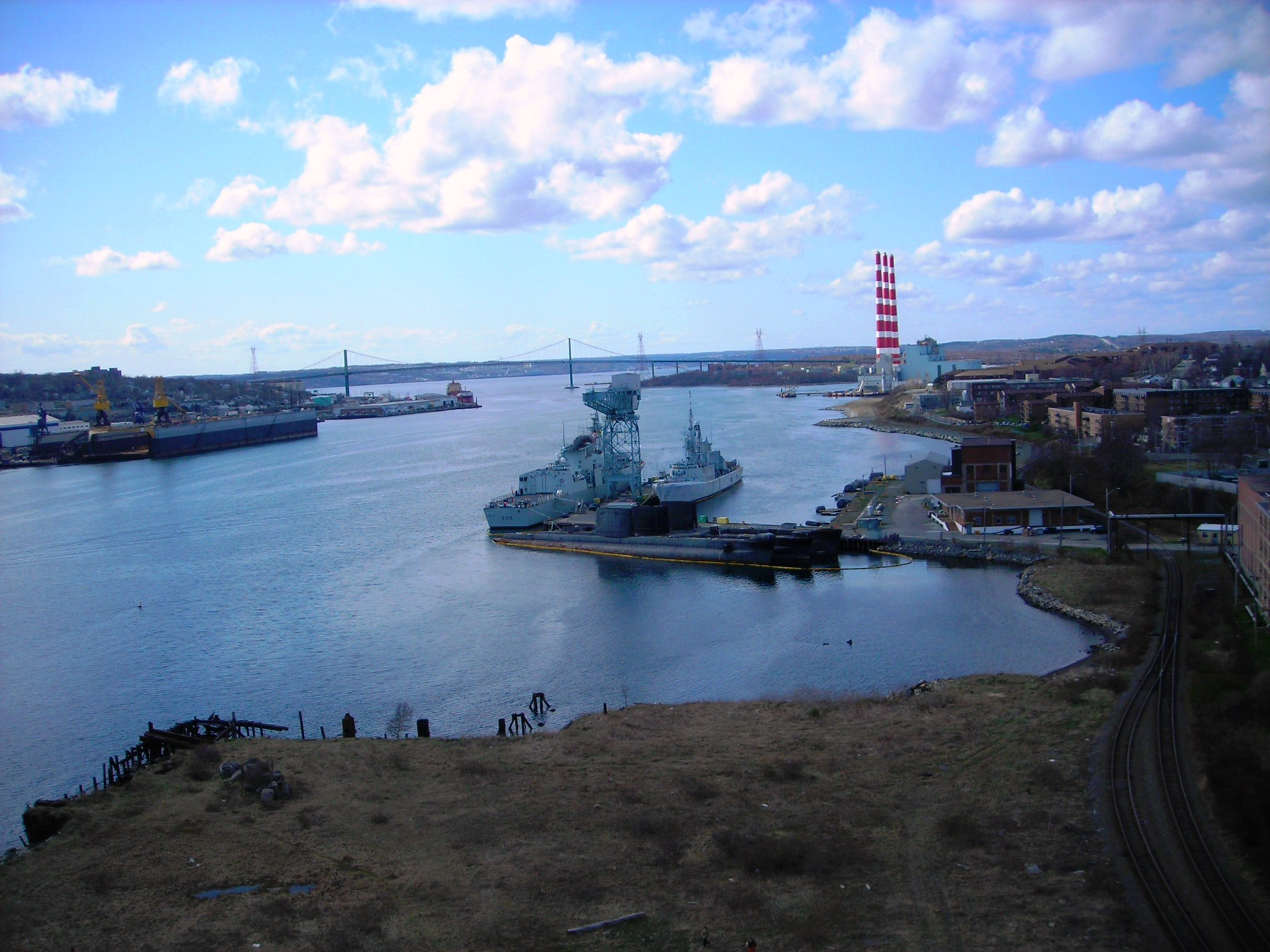
- HMCS Ojibwa, HMCS Okanagan and ex-HMS Olympus docked in Halifax

History

Canada
- Name: Okanagan
- Namesake: Okanagan First Nations people
- Builder: Chatham Dockyard, Chatham
- Laid down: 25 March 1965
- Launched: 17 September 1966
- Commissioned: 22 June 1968
- Decommissioned: 14 September 1998
- Motto: Ex imo mari ad victoriam; ("From the depths of the sea to victory")
- Fate: Scrapped in 2011
- Badge: Blazon Or, issuing out of a base barry wavy of four azure and argent, a marine monster "Ogopogo" gules, langued of the second. the first Parliament of Upper Canada in 1792, both proper.

General characteristics
- Class & type: Oberon-class submarine
- Displacement: Surfaced: 2,030 t (2,000 long tons); Submerged: 2,410 t (2,370 long tons)
- Length: 295.25 ft (89.99 m)
- Beam: 26.5 ft (8.1 m)
- Draught: 18 ft (5.5 m)
- Propulsion: 2 diesel electric engines
- Speed: Surfaced: 12 kn (22 km/h; 14 mph); Submerged: 17.5 kn (32.4 km/h; 20.1 mph)
- Range: 9,000 nautical miles (17,000 km; 10,000 mi)
- Endurance: 56 days
- Test depth: 120–180 metres (390–590 ft)
- Complement: 69
- Sensors & processing systems: Type 187 Active-Passive sonar; Type 2007 passive sonar
- Electronic warfare & decoys: MEL Manta UAL or UA4 radar warning
- Armament: 8 × 21 in (533 mm) tubes (6 bow, 2 stern), 18 torpedoes

HMCS Okanagan (S74) was an Oberon-class submarine that served in the Canadian Forces (CF). She entered service in 1968 and spent the majority of her career on the east coast. The ship was paid off in 1998 and sold for scrap in 2011.

== Design ==
The Oberon class were considered an improved version of the preceding Porpoise-class submarines, with a different frame of the pressure hull and constructed from a better grade of steel. These build differences allowed the Oberons to have a deeper diving depth at roughly 1,000 feet (300 m).

The submarines displaced 2,030 tonnes (2,000 long tons) surfaced and 2,410 tonnes (2,370 long tons) submerged. They measured 295 ft 1/4 in (89.922 m) long with a beam of 26 ft 1/2 in (7.938 m) and a draught of 18 ft (5.5 m). (Note: Gardiner and Chumbley state that the dimensions were 241 ft (73 m) between perpendiculars, 290 ft 3 in (88.47 m) long overall with a beam of 26 ft 6 in (8.08 m) and a draught of 18 ft 3 in (5.56 m))

The boats were powered by a two shaft diesel-electric system. The Oberons were equipped with two ASR 1 16-cylinder diesel engines creating 3,680 brake horsepower (2,740 kW) and two English Electric motors creating 6,000 shaft horsepower (4,500 kW). This gave the submarines a maximum surface speed of 12 knots (22 km/h; 14 mph) and a submerged speed of 17 knots (31 km/h; 20 mph). The boats carried 258 tons of oil giving them a range of 9,000 nautical miles (17,000 km; 10,000 mi) at 12 knots.

The design was armed with eight 21-inch (533 mm) torpedo tubes, six in the bow and two in the stern. They carried 24 reloads for a total of 30 torpedoes. Canadian boats differed from the original design by being equipped for the US Mark 37C torpedo. The longer, wire-guided Mod 2 version was carried in the forward tubes and the non-guided Mod 0 for the rear tubes.

The Oberons were equipped with Type 187 active-passive sonar, Type 2007 passive sonar and Type 2019 sonar.

=== Submarine Operational Update Program (SOUP) ===
By the late 1970s, the Oberons in Canadian service had become obsolete and were in need of an update. Planning was done in 1978 and the program approved in February 1979. In an effort to take the subs from anti-submarine warfare training to frontline service, Maritime Command developed a refit program that included new sonars, periscopes, communications and fire-control systems. They also had their armament upgraded with the fitting of torpedo tubes capable of firing the Mark 48 torpedo. This would allow the submarines to be deployed by NATO in the North Atlantic to monitor Soviet submarines.

The SOUP refits comprised a new US fire control system, a digital Singer Librascope Mark I, and new Sperry passive ranging sonar with the Type 719 short range sonar removed. The new sonar was placed in the upper casing on the pressure hull. New communications and navigational systems were installed. The submarines were fitted with new torpedo tubes for Mark 48 torpedoes, however the torpedoes themselves were considered a separate procurement program, which was only finalized in 1985.

Between 1980 and 1986, one of the Canadian Oberons was out of service undergoing the refit. SOUP came in on time and on its budget of C$45 million in 1986. SOUP kept the Canadian Oberons operational until the end of the 1990s when they were replaced by the British Upholder-class submarines.

== Acquisition ==
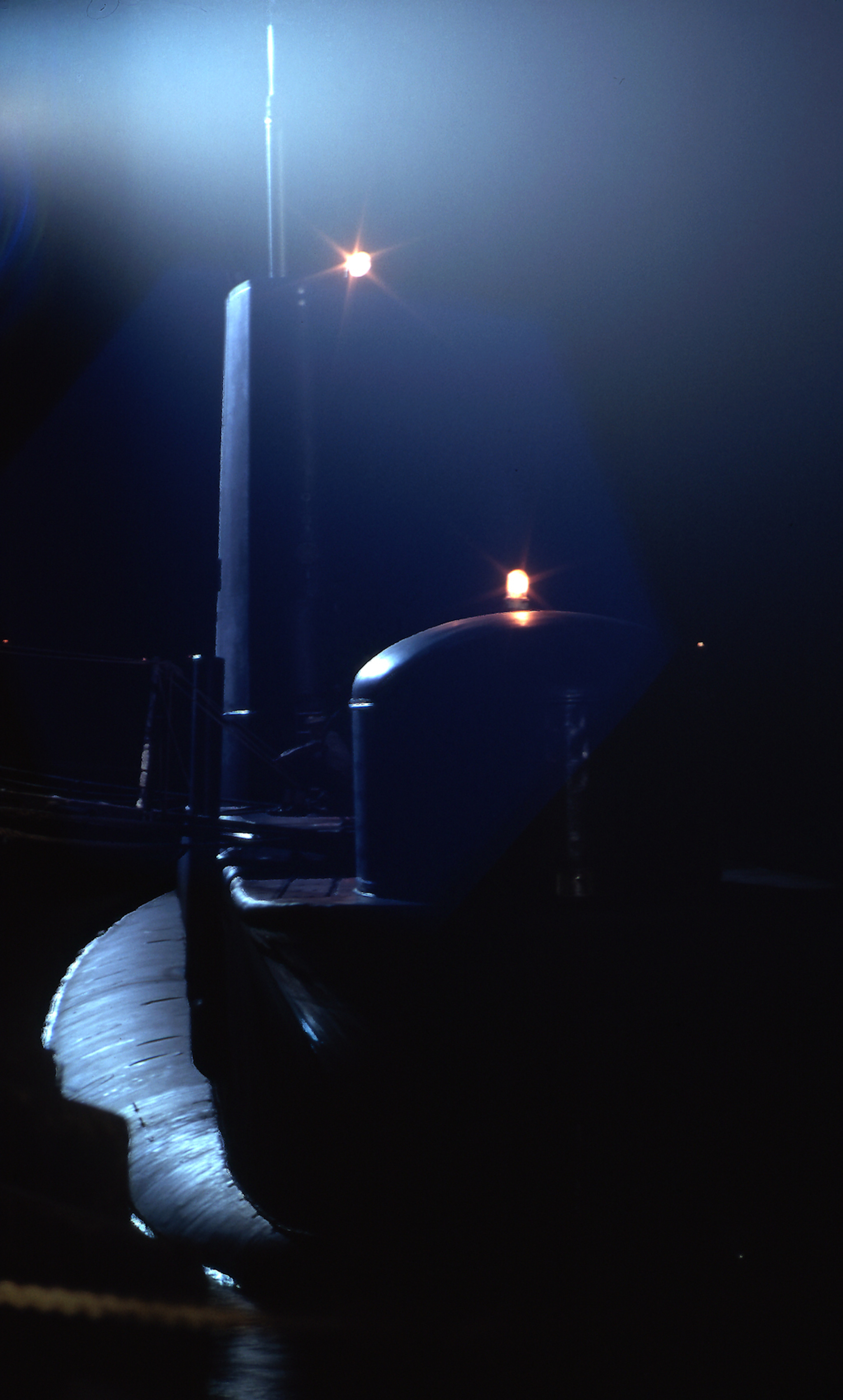
A Canadian Oberon-class submarine alongside in Roosey Roads for Operation Springboard; Jan 1969

In March 1962, the Cabinet recommended the purchase of three Oberons and eight frigates, on the condition that the cost of acquiring the submarines from the United Kingdom would be offset by British defence purchases in Canada. On 11 April 1962, the purchase was announced in the House of Commons of Canada by the Minister of National Defence, Douglas Harkness.

However, the Conservative government postponed the acquisition of the Oberons due to the slow speed of the United Kingdom's attempt to offset the acquisition. The Conservative government was defeated in 1963 and the incoming Liberal government suspended all major defence procurement projects upon taking power. The final price of C$40 million for the entire contract was agreed upon in 1963. However, due to Canadian modifications to the design, that number climbed to C$51.4 million.

Since Onyx was already under construction, the boat was finished to Royal Navy specifications. All three boats received modifications to the original Oberon design, which included the enlargement of the snort de-icer, a different weapons fit, a larger air conditioning unit, active sonar and different communications equipment. The second and third hulls were built to Canadian specifications, which moved the galley forward of the control room to make room for the sonar equipment. This led to the removal of three crew bunks, a problem that was never rectified in the submarines and led to an accommodation issue for the crew. The three submarines were acquired for service as "clockwork mice", submarines used to train surface vessels in anti-submarine warfare.

== Construction and career ==
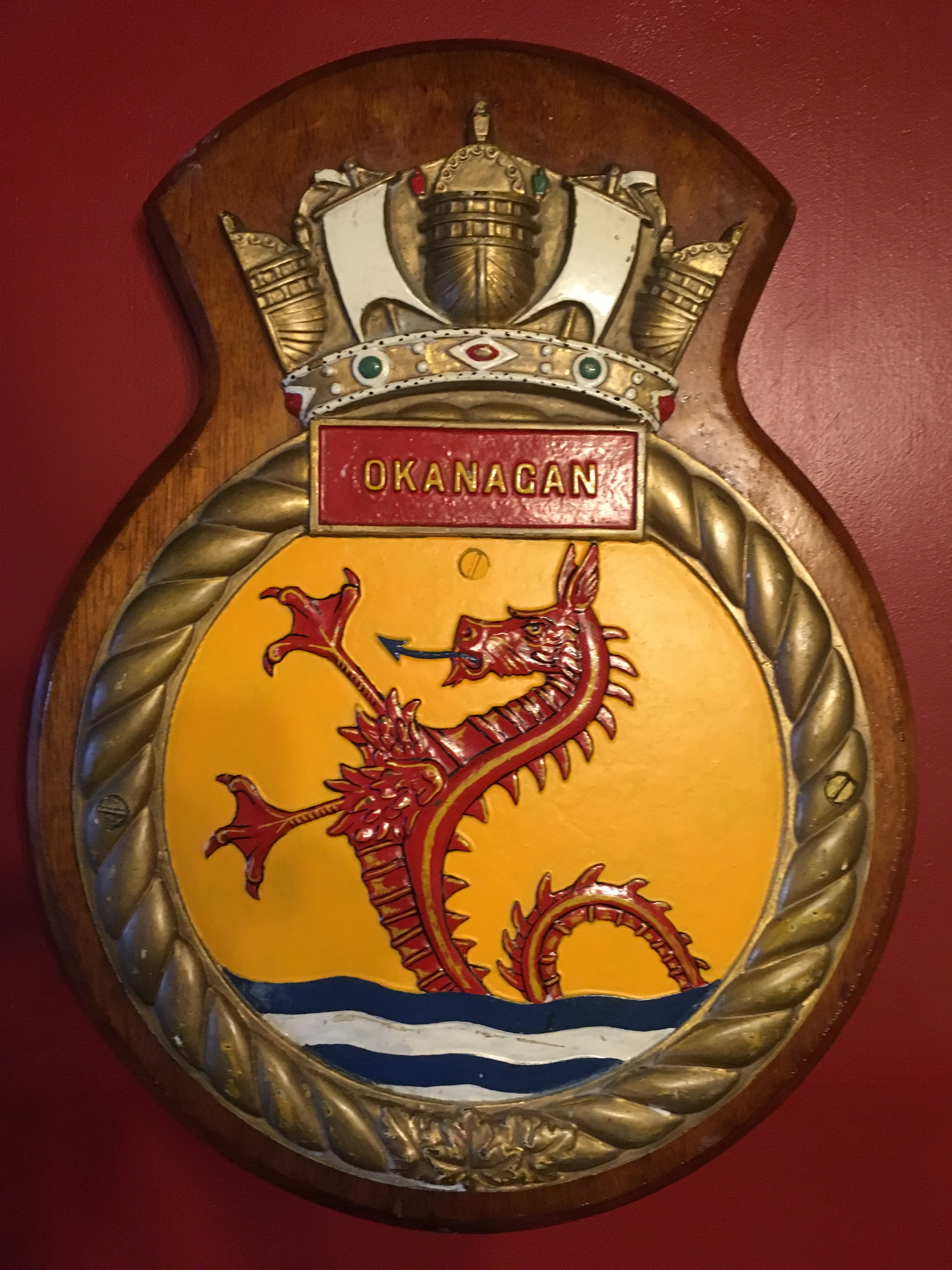
The badge of Okanagan

The submarine, built at Chatham Dockyard in England, was laid down on 25 March 1965, and launched on 17 September 1966 by Monique Cadieux, the wife of the Associate Minister of Canadian National Defence. She was commissioned on 22 June 1968 at Chatham. She was also the final submarine constructed at Chatham Dockyard. The submarine was named after the Okanagan First Nations people, and was assigned the pennant number S 74.

Okanagan was assigned to the First Canadian Submarine Squadron, joined by her sister boats and served her entire career with Maritime Forces Atlantic (MARLANT) in the North Atlantic. Okanagan spent time training with the Royal Navy after an exchange program was instituted in the 1960s that would see submarines from both the Royal Navy and Royal Canadian Navy spend time with each other's forces. This allowed Canadian submarines on intelligence-gathering missions. Beginning in the 1970s, Canada began underwater surveillance patrols in the western Atlantic, tracking Soviet sub and surface fleet vessels, especially the ballistic missile submarines, usually in concert with an Argus or Aurora patrol aircraft.

In July 1973, Okanagan collided with the Royal Fleet Auxiliary vessel Grey Rover while exercising in British waters off the coast of Scotland. The submarine was running submerged off the mouth of the River Clyde when the tanker hit Okanagan. There were no injuries to the submarine's complement. However, the submarine suffered damaged to her fin and mast. The submarine returned to Faslane to effect repairs.

On 30 June 1983, Okanagan was deployed on a 19-day anti-Soviet submarine patrol. Okanagan underwent her SOUP refit beginning in 1984, being handed over to HMC Dockyard at Halifax, Nova Scotia on 2 April. The refit began on 12 June 1985 and lasted until 7 April 1986. Following the SOUP refit and the introduction of the Mark 48 torpedoes, the Oberons were considered fully operational and counted the same as other offensive fleet units in Maritime Command (MARCOM).

In October–November 1990, Okanagan cruised the Great Lakes, the first Canadian submarine to do so. Following the end of the Cold War, the Oberons were retasked, performing patrols on behalf of federal institutions such as the Department of Fisheries and Oceans and the Solicitor General of Canada between 1991 and 1994. The delay of the introduction of the Victoria-class submarines led to the Oberons working past their life expectancy. During the Turbot War, the Oberons were tasked with monitoring European fishing fleets off the Grand Banks of Newfoundland. Their presence served as a deterrent in the escalating crisis.

In early September 1998, Okanagan was used for a successful search of the ocean floor off the coast of Nova Scotia for the flight recorders of the crashed Swissair Flight 111. She was paid off from MARCOM on 12 September 1998.

In May 2005, the Halifax Chronicle-Herald announced that MARCOM was looking to sell Okanagan for scrap metal, along with three other Canadian Oberons laid up at CFB Halifax. MARCOM stated that the submarines were not in suitable condition to be used as museum ships and predicted that each submarine would sell for between C$50,000 and C$60,000. Okanagan was towed to a scrapyard in Port Maitland, Ontario in August 2011.
