= RFA Grey Rover =

1970 Rover-class small fleet tanker of the Royal Fleet Auxiliary

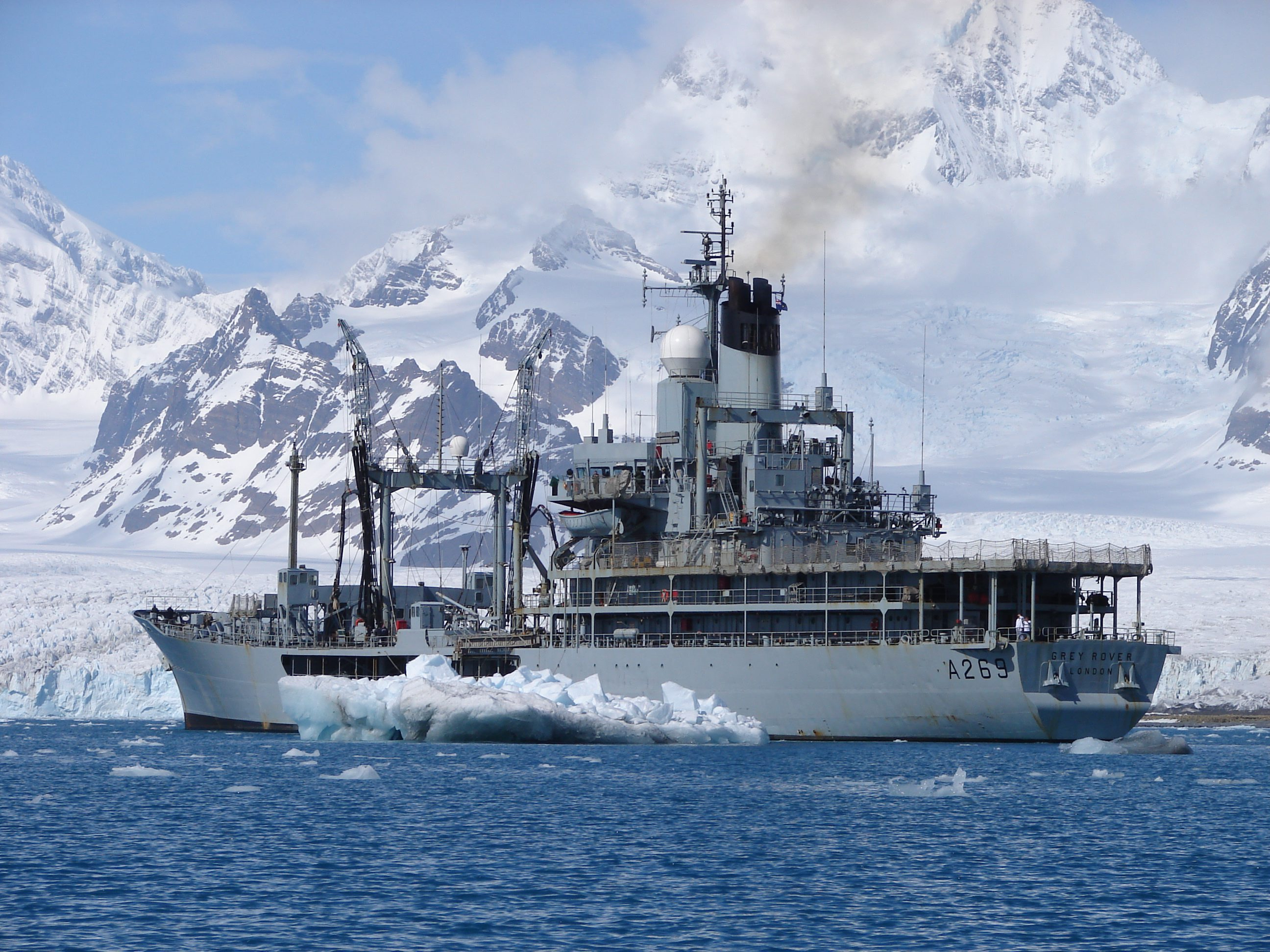
- The RFA Grey Rover around the coast of South Georgia Falkland Islands, October 2005.

History

United Kingdom
- Name: Grey Rover
- Ordered: January 1968
- Builder: Swan Hunter
- Yard number: 7
- Laid down: 28 February 1968
- Launched: 17 April 1969
- In service: 10 March 1970
- Out of service: 24 February 2006
- Identification: IMO number: 6923163; Callsign: GYXM; Pennant number: A269; Flight deck: GY
- Fate: Scrapped
- Badge

General characteristics
- Class & type: Rover-class tanker
- Tonnage: 7,509 GRT; 3,185 NRT; 6,822 DWT
- Displacement: 11,522 tons full load
- Length: 461 ft 4 in (140.61 m)
- Beam: 63 ft 2 in (19.25 m)
- Draught: 24 ft 0 in (7.32 m)
- Depth: 33 ft 6 in (10.21 m)
- Propulsion: 2 x 16 cyl Ruston diesel engines (orig); 2 × SEMT-Pielstick 16 PA 4 diesel engines (post 1975); 15,360 hp (11,450 kW); 1 × shaft; Bow thruster
- Speed: 18 knots (33 km/h; 21 mph)
- Range: 15,000 miles (24,000 km) at 15 knots (28 km/h)
- Capacity: 7,460 m^{3} (46,900 bbl) fuel oil; 600 tons aviation fuel; 70 tons lubricating oil; 362 m^{3} (80,000 imp gal) fresh water
- Complement: 16 officers; 31 ratings
- Sensors & processing systems: Sperry Marine Visionmaster radars and ECDIS; 1690 I band navigation radars
- Electronic warfare & decoys: 2 × Corvus and 2 × Plessey Shield decoy launchers; Graseby Type 182 towed torpedo decoy
- Armament: 2 × Oerlikon 20 mm cannon; 2 × 7.62 mm machine guns
- Aircraft carried: one flight spot for a Merlin can take a Chinook
- Aviation facilities: Helicopter deck (no hangar)

RFA Grey Rover (A269) was a Rover-class small fleet tanker of the Royal Fleet Auxiliary (RFA). She was decommissioned in 2006.

== Launch and commissioning ==
Grey Rover was launched at the Swan Hunter yard, Hebburn on Tyne, on 17 April 1969. The Lady Sponsor was Lady Parker, the wife of Vice Admiral Sir John Parker who was Flag Officer Medway. She was completed on 10 April 1970 and accepted into service three months later than planned.

== Operational history ==
=== 1970–1980 ===
In September 1970, Grey Rover took over from RFA Black Ranger as Flag Officer Sea Training (FOST) tanker.

In July 1973, she was involved in a collision with the Canadian submarine HMCS Okanagan resulting in the need to dry dock in Govan for repairs.

Between 17 June and 22 June 1976 she stood off the Lebanon to evacuate British nationals along with RFA Stromness and the frigates HMS Exmouth and HMS Mermaid.

=== 1981–1990 ===
During Operation Corporate (the Falklands War), Grey Rover was the only operational RFA tanker which remained in UK waters. She carried out replenishment at sea (RAS) trials with STUFT ships en route to the Falkland Islands in the southwest approaches to the English Channel whilst herself was based at Portland. The smallest vessel worked with was the trawler FV Farnella and the largest was the ocean liner Queen Elizabeth 2.

=== 1991–2000 ===
In January 1994, Grey Rover berthed at Cape Town, South Africa, in company with HMS Norfolk for a five-day visit. Both ships were open to the public and 53,000 visitors were received on board both ships.

Grey Rover's last refit was 15 June–27 November 1998 which extended her service life into the 21st century.

=== 2001–2006 ===
External videos
- A time-lapse video of the vessel being scrapped via Vimeo

On 2 February 2006, while supporting the Type 42 destroyer HMS Southampton in the Caribbean as part of Atlantic Patrol Task (North), Grey Rover was involved in the boarding of merchant vessel MV Rampage and the seizure of 3.5 tonnes (3.4 long tons; 3.9 short tons) of cocaine with an estimated street value of £350 million.

In November 2004, the Parliamentary Under-Secretary of State for Defence Procurement Lord Bach announced that Grey Rover would have a decommissioning date of 2007. She paid off early on 15 March 2006 and was towed to Canada Dock, Liverpool for scrapping.
