= Strick Line =

British shipping company

Strick Line Ltd
- House flag
- Industry: Shipping
- Founded: 1887; 139 years ago
- Founder: Frank Clarke Strick
- Defunct: 1976
- Successor: P&O
- Headquarters: UK

The Strick Line was a British shipping company. Strick Line operated mainly in the Persian Gulf region, but was also supposed to have a tramping fleet trading in the Mediterranean Sea. Frank Clarke Strick (1849–1943) purchased a small steamer to raise the capital of an Anglo-Algerian Steamship Company Limited to operate the vessel. For the first years, the trade model included the transport of coal from Great Britain to ports in western Italy and iron ore from Béni Saf in North Africa to Great Britain or to the mainland. In 1892, the company began trading between Great Britain and the Persian Gulf. In the early 1900s, Strick had 15 ships. From 1903, the company operated in conjunction with the Bucknall Steamship Line to transport equipment, supplies and oil prospecting personnel to the Persian Gulf. In 1923, the company was bought by P&O.
