= Graseby =

Graseby was a British engineering company.

== History ==
As Graseby Instruments it made and refurbished naval sonar equipment. The company (00385807) was established on 25 February 1944. It was initially situated in Tolworth in south-west London.

On 1 January 1982 it merged with Pye Dynamics forming Graseby Dynamics and moved its operations to the latter's site in Bushey, Hertfordshire. Graseby Dynamics' business activities were:

- Marine - the ex-Instruments services,

- Medical - principally Cot Death Monitors and Continuous Syringe Drivers,

- Ordnance - including test and post-design services,

- RF products - specialist services and the manufacture of Personal Locator Beacons (PLBs),

- Ionics/Security/Analytical providing vapour detectors based up Ion Mobility Spectrometry - the three identities addressing the Military, Civil and Space markets respectively.

Later Graseby Dynamics became part of Cambridge Electronic Industries plc. As part of a rationalisation process Cambridge Electronic Industries later changed it name to Graseby plc in January 1992 - a process it extended to many of its remaining subsidiaries, e.g. Newmarket Semiconductors became Graseby Semiconductors

In April 1988 Graseby Ionics won the Queen's Award for Technological Achievement for CAM, a hand-held chemical agent monitor.

In May 1992 Graseby plc bought Intertest.

On 7 August 1997 it was bought for £136m (US$216.7m) by Smiths Industries.

On 16 March 1998 Smith Industries sold Graseby Andersen and Graseby Product Monitoring to Thermo Electron. Graseby Product Monitoring included Goring Kerr, Best and Allen Coding was absorbed by Thermo Sentron for US$43m. Thermo Sentron also owned competing brands such as Ramsey and Icore. Thermo Instrument Systems acquired Graseby Andersen. The aggregate price was US$73 million. Combined revenues of these companies were US$78 million.

== Products ==
- Sonar equipment
- Torpedo decoys
- Gyroscopes for inertial navigation of guided missiles in a gimbal system.
- Chemical agent monitors (Graseby Dynamics)
- Metal Detector (Graseby Goring Kerr)
- X-Ray (Graseby Goring Kerr)
- Checkweigher (Graseby Best)

== Alumni ==
- Godfey and Hilda Sharman, Founders of Graseby Instruments, 1940 - 1982
- Paul Lester, former Chief Executive from 1990–97
- Steven Glick, General Counsel, Graseby plc, 1992-96
- Dave Johnson, President, Graseby Volkman, Graseby Goring Kerr
- Tim Coombs, Managing Director, Graseby Medical, Graseby Product Monitoring
- Ping Wu, Sales Director, Graseby Goring Kerr
- David Reid, Director, Goring Kerr Metal Detection
- John Cooper, Graseby plc
- Tim O'Brien, Graseby Volkman

== See also ==
- Graseby, a brand of syringe pumps of Smiths Medical
