= Corvus chaff launcher =

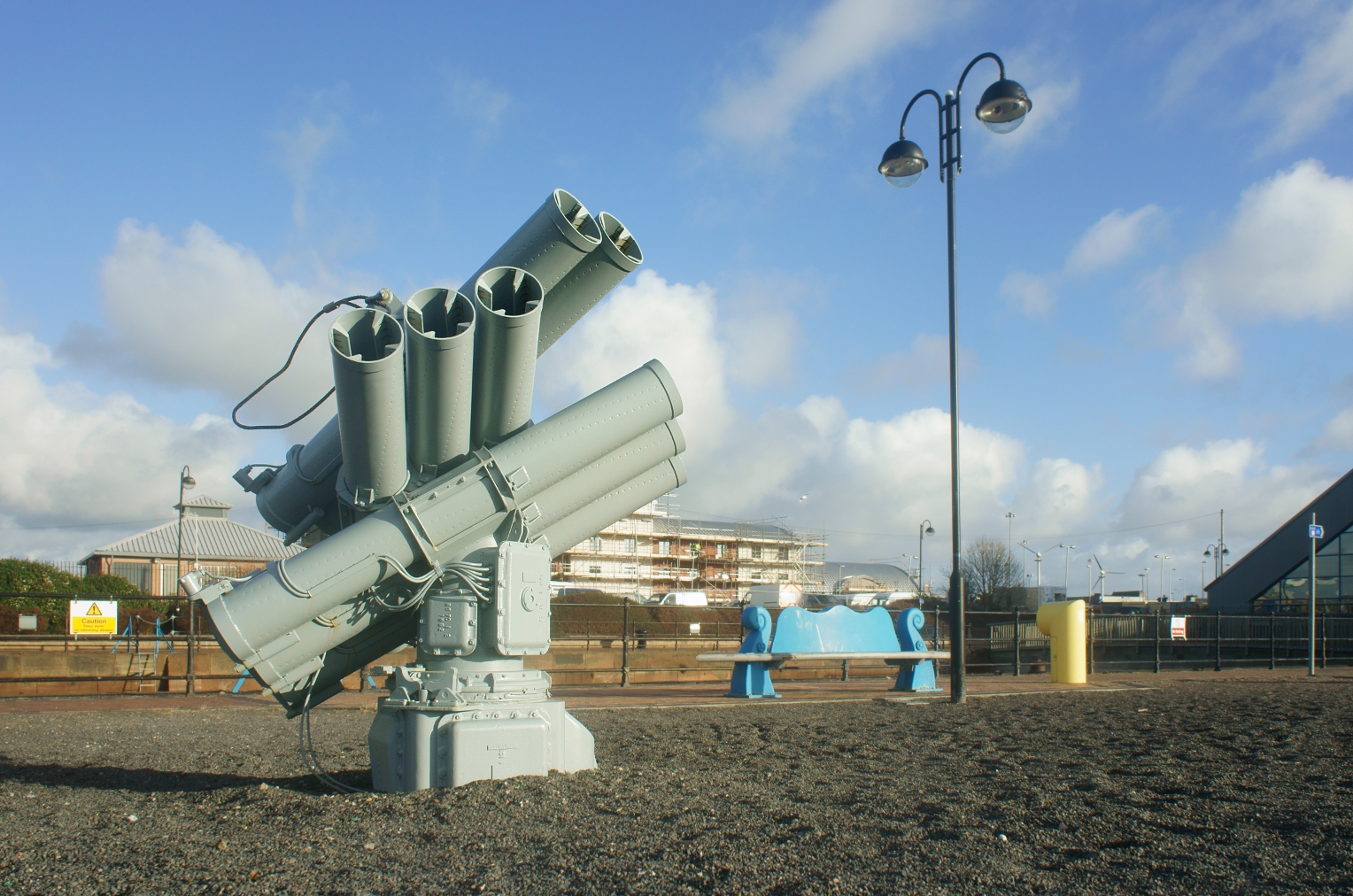
Corvus chaff launcher in Barrow-in-Furness

Corvus chaff launcher is a British shipborne chaff decoy launching system manufactured by Vickers Ltd Group. It is a lightweight, quick reaction system for the self-defence of surface vessels against surface-to-surface and air-to-surface missiles, where chaff dispensing rockets form a radar decoy screen.

The system comprises multi-barrelled rocket launcher, launcher control, firing panel and a maximum load of 8 rockets. The arrangement offers distraction and centroid operating modes, with the two differing in the azimuth angle at firing and the range in which the chaff is released.

Corvus features a cylindrical rotating structure that carries eight launching tubes mounted in two sets of three, one above the other and at 90° with two more tubes aligned midway between these, at a fixed elevation of 30°. A deck-mounted pedestal supports the rotating structure on its training bearing and houses a self-contained electrical power unit for the control circuits and associated electrical equipment. The firing and control panel is located in the host vessel's combat information centre.

The rockets are reloaded by hand from a ready-to-use locker, located close to the launching platform.

== See also ==
- Chaff (countermeasure)
- Electronic warfare
- Radar
- Rocket launcher
- Missile
- Air-to-surface missile
- Anti-ship missile
- Decoy
- Vickers
