= Sarah West =

British Royal Navy officer

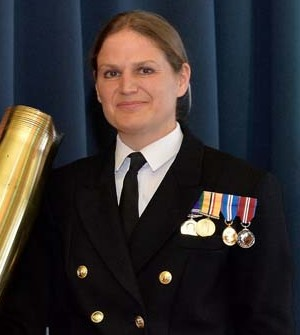
- Commander West in 2013
- Born: 1972 (age 53–54); Grimsby, Lincolnshire, England
- Military career
- Allegiance: United Kingdom
- Branch: Royal Navy
- Service years: 1995–2014
- Rank: Commander
- Commands: HMS Ramsey; HMS Penzance; HMS Pembroke; HMS Shoreham; HMS Portland
- Conflicts: Iraq War

Sarah West (born 1972) is a retired Royal Navy officer, the first woman to be appointed to command a major warship in the Royal Navy.

West was born in Lincolnshire and studied mathematics at the University of Hertfordshire before entering Britannia Royal Naval College in September 1995. She joined the Royal Navy as a warfare officer. She also took a law degree whilst on active service in the Middle East and is an expert in large-scale naval planning, mine clearance, weapons systems and underwater warfare. She was trained on HMS Battleaxe, HMS Sandown and HMS Sheffield, deployed in the Persian Gulf. West went on to join the minesweeper HMS Cottesmore as a navigator in 1997, and later served as officer of the watch of HMS Sheffield and navigating officer of HMS Somerset.

West went on to complete the Principal Warfare Officers' course, specialising in underwater warfare, and joined HMS Cornwall in 2003. She became Operations Officer in HMS Norfolk in 2004, and spent some time as the ship's executive officer. She was with Commander Amphibious Task Group from 2005 as the underwater warfare specialist, then at Permanent Joint Headquarters at Northwood from 2007, followed by work with the Middle East Operations Team. West went on to command several of the ships of the First Mine Counter Measures Squadron between April 2009 and December 2011, HMS Ramsey, HMS Penzance, HMS Pembroke and HMS Shoreham. She has also worked on the co-ordination and logistics of the evacuation of UK citizens during the 2006 Lebanon War, naval operations at the time of the 2008 Kosovo declaration of independence and the British naval contribution to the Iraq War. She was promoted to commander in January 2012.

In May 2012 West assumed command of HMS Portland, a Type 23 frigate. West left the ship during a seven-month deployment to the Caribbean in mid-2014, after allegations that she had had an affair with one of her officers. The Royal Navy was reported to be investigating the allegations. On 8 August 2014 the Navy announced that West had been removed from command, citing an "internal matter", and that she would be reappointed to another post.
