= List of ship commissionings in 1998 =

The list of ship commissionings in 1998 includes a chronological list of all ships commissioned in 1998.

	Operator	Ship	Flag	Class and type	Pennant	Other notes
31 January	Royal Australian Navy	Farncomb		Collins-class submarine	SSG 74	
14 February	United States Navy	Mahan		Arleigh Burke-class destroyer	DDG-72	
15 March	Egyptian Navy	Sharm El-Sheik		Oliver Hazard Perry-class frigate	F901	former USS Fahrion
18 April	Royal Netherlands Navy	Rotterdam		Rotterdam-class amphibious transport dock	L800	
25 April	United States Navy	McFaul		Arleigh Burke-class destroyer	DDG-74	
14 May	Royal Navy	Penzance		Sandown-class minehunter	M106	
25 July	United States Navy	Harry S. Truman		Nimitz-class aircraft carrier	CVN-75	
5 August	United States Navy	Bridge		Supply-class fast combat support ship	AOE-10	
15 August	United States Navy	Bonhomme Richard		Wasp-class amphibious assault ship	LHD-6	
30 September	Royal Navy	Ocean		Ocean-class landing platform helicopter	L12	
6 October	Royal Navy	Pembroke		Sandown-class minehunter	M107	
4 December	United States Navy	Donald Cook		Arleigh Burke-class destroyer	DDG-75	
