= Great Mull Air Mystery =

1975 British aviation incident

Coordinates: 56.5165°N 5.9133°W

The Great Mull Air Mystery is the name given by the media to the disappearance of pilot Peter Gibbs on 24 December 1975 after he took an unscheduled solo night flight from Glenforsa Airfield on the Isle of Mull in Argyll and Bute, Scotland, United Kingdom. Gibbs' uninjured but decomposed body was discovered, without the plane, on a hillside near the airfield four months later, but how and why he came to be there has never been established.

== Background ==
=== Peter Gibbs ===
Norman Peter Gibbs, born in 1920, was a former Spitfire pilot with No. 41 Squadron RAF in World War II, serving between January 1944 and March 1945. In 1954, nine years after leaving the Royal Air Force, Gibbs became a professional musician and joined the Philharmonia Orchestra, and joined the London Symphony Orchestra two years later.

Gibbs' tenure with the Philharmonia was notable for an incident which occurred during a 1956 tour of the United States. The orchestra felt conductor Herbert von Karajan had been unprofessional when conducting smaller concerts during the tour, coming to a head when von Karajan left the stage in Boston after the last note was played, neither waiting for applause nor calls for an encore. The orchestra was upset by this apparent slight to both them and the audience, but turned up nonetheless on time for an early rehearsal the next day. When Karajan arrived late, Gibbs rebuked him directly, stating, "I did not spend four years of my life fighting bastards like you to be insulted before our own Allies as you did last evening." Karajan ignored him and continued conducting as if nothing had happened. However, that night during a concert, Karajan refused to go back on stage after the interval until a letter was signed stating that Gibbs be immediately sacked. The orchestra's managers had little choice but to comply and Gibbs never played with the Philharmonia again.

Gibbs joined the Surrey Flying Club in June 1957 and then flew regularly for the next eighteen years. He continued to fly in his civilian life and held a private pilot's licence with more than 2,000 hours' flight experience. In later life Gibbs became the managing director of a property development company called Gibbs and Rae. He was 55 at the time of the disappearance and resided in London.

== Disappearance ==
On Saturday 20 December 1975 Gibbs travelled via ferry to the Isle of Mull, in the Inner Hebrides of Scotland, as he was interested in buying a hotel as an investment. Gibbs arrived on Mull with girlfriend, Felicity Grainger, a 32-year-old university lecturer.

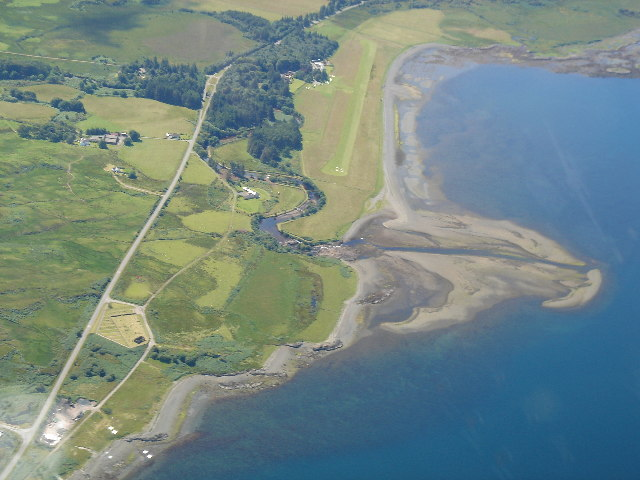
Glenforsa Airfield

The couple were using the Glenforsa Hotel, on the edge of the Sound of Mull, as their base. The hotel had its own 780m airstrip, Glenforsa Airfield, and they were using a plane to fly between the Inner Hebridean islands. Glenforsa Airfield was built by the Royal Engineers between May and August 1965 to act as the only fixed-wing air ambulance evacuation facility on Mull. The airstrip is grass and at that time had no runway lights.

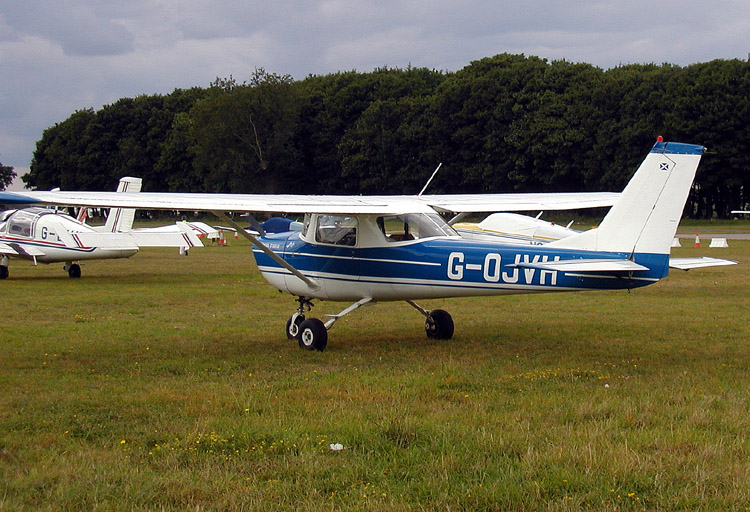
Cessna F150H

Gibbs hired a Cessna aircraft from David Howitt, the manager of the Glenforsa Hotel. The plane was a Cessna F150H, registration mark G-AVTN, painted red and white. The Cessna had been owned by Ian Hamilton since September 1975 and was kept at North Connel airport near Oban. Gibbs' private pilot's licence had expired but he told the owner of the plane that he had left his licence behind.

On the morning of 24 December 1975, Gibbs and Grainger flew from Mull to Broadford on the Isle of Skye to spend the day viewing properties. They flew back to Mull and had a dinner at the hotel that included whisky and red wine. They had just finished dinner at the Glenforsa Hotel when Gibbs decided to take a solo flight. Gibbs borrowed two powerful torches to use as landing lights for Grainger to use to guide him in.

Some guests present stated that they thought they saw two people moving torches on the runway. Others observed that Gibbs appeared to have spent an unusually long time warming up the plane's engine. Gibbs was observed to turn the plane lights off, then on, then off again. He then took off from the unlit airfield on a moonless night and, after the plane disappeared behind a line of trees, he was never seen alive again. Hotel guests realised that Gibbs was intent on making a circuit and rushed upstairs to the bar to watch the landing as the airfield was almost never used at night. The guests turned the lights off in the bar to reduce internal reflections on the glass and get better view of the night flight. Grainger stood at the end of the runway holding the torches.

After ten minutes Howitt began to worry, fearing that the Cessna had ditched, and went to try to find it. He drove the hotel's Ford Cortina through the driving sleet to try to find Gibbs. Howitt dipped the car's headlights to illuminate the water but no trace of the plane was seen. An organised search was mounted, but no trace of Gibbs or the plane was found. The search was described as huge and extended over the Christmas holiday.

== Discovery of the body ==
In April 1976, four months after the disappearance, Gibbs' body was discovered by a local shepherd, Donald MacKinnon. The body was found lying partway up a remote hillside about 1 mile (1.5 kilometres) from Glenforsa Airfield. The initial search for Gibbs had passed through this area at the time of the disappearance, but nothing had been found at that time.

Gibbs' body was found lying across a fallen larch tree 400 feet (120 metres) up the hillside, not far from the road. Due to decomposition the only thing holding the body together was the clothing. The body was facing due north in a direction that indicated that Gibbs was walking down hill. The police had to cut a branch off the tree to remove the body.

The body was taken to Glasgow for the post mortem. Gibbs' remains gave no clues to his cause of death. Only minor injuries were found and there was nothing to indicate a fall from a plane or any evidence that he died in another place and was left on the tree. According to the pathologists’ report the condition of the body was "entirely consistent with lying out there for a period of four months". Forensic tests detected no salt or marine organisms in Gibbs' clothing or boots. In the absence of any other evidence, Gibbs' death was noted down by the pathologist as being due to exposure.

The discovery of the body sent investigators looking for the plane on land, in woods and by dragging lochs. No wreckage was found of the aircraft at that time.

== Possible discovery of the aircraft ==
In September 1986 it was claimed that Gibbs’ plane had been found in the sea off Oban. A clam diver searching for scallops reported finding a small plane with both wings missing.

In February 2004 minesweepers HMS Pembroke, HMS Penzance and HMS Inverness were undertaking a coastal mapping operation in the waters off Oban and found a plane 30m beneath the surface. HMS Pembroke used a remote underwater camera to take pictures of the wreckage which appeared to be of a small plane with one wing still attached, possibly Gibbs' Cessna. The wreckage was 200–300 m off the coast at the bottom of the sound of Mull. It was reported that the windscreen was out and both doors were locked. The aircraft yielded no clues as to how it came to be there.

== See also ==
- List of unsolved deaths
