= Sandown-class minehunter =

1989 class of British minehunters

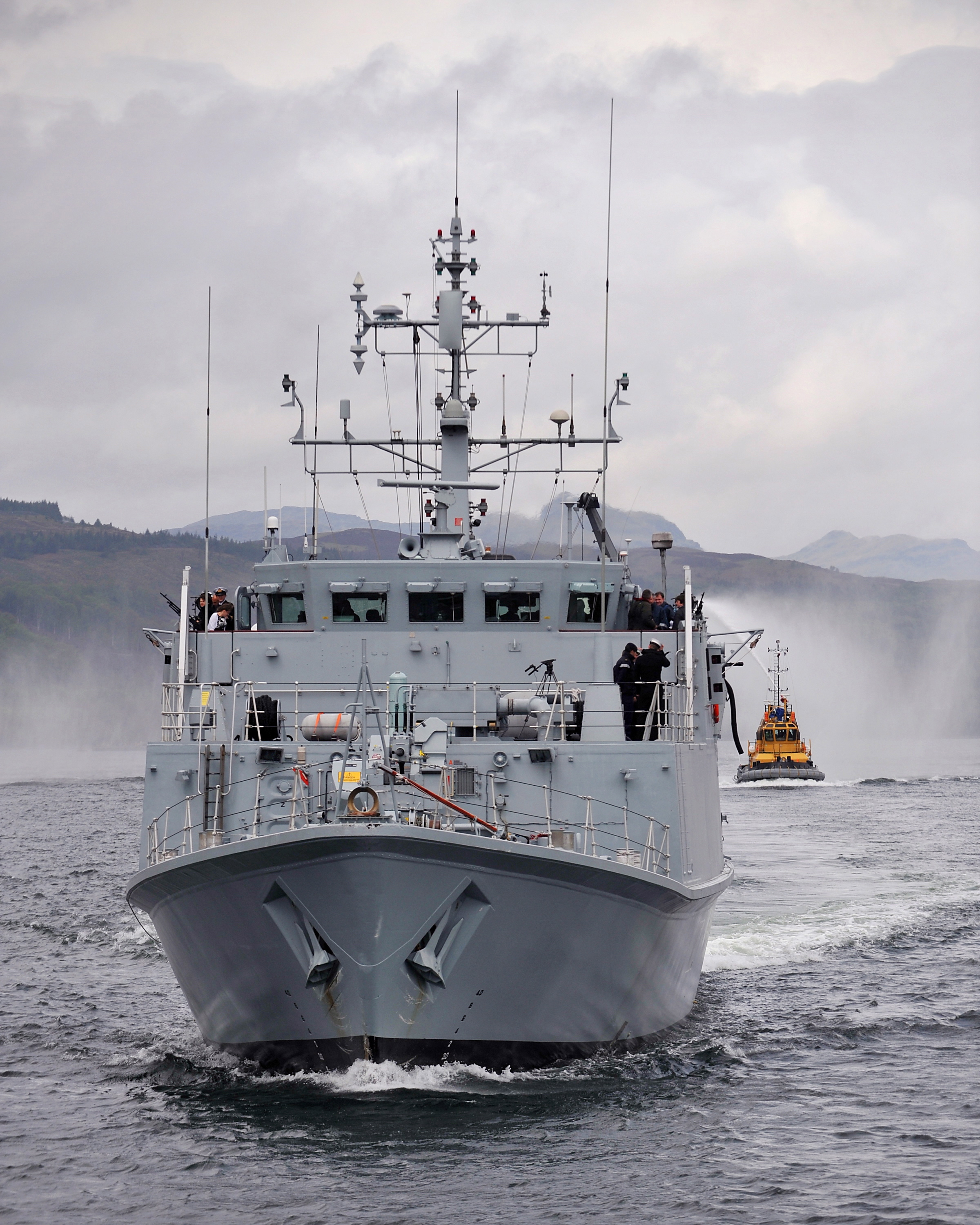
- HMS Ramsey at HMNB Clyde, 2011

Class overview
- Name: Sandown class
- Builders: Vosper Thornycroft, Woolston
- Operators: Royal Navy; Estonian Navy; Royal Saudi Navy; Ukrainian Navy; Romanian Naval Forces
- Preceded by: Ton-class minesweeper
- Succeeded by: Future command and support vessels for autonomous systems, Autonomous minehunting systems
- In service: 1989
- Completed: 15
- Active: 11+ (1 Royal Navy, 3 each Estonian and Royal Saudi Navies; 2 transferred to Ukraine and 2+ being transferred to Romania)
- Laid up: 1 (Royal Navy static training vessel)

General characteristics
- Type: Minehunter
- Displacement: 600 t (590 long tons; 660 short tons)
- Length: 52.5 m (172 ft 3 in)
- Beam: 10.9 m (35 ft 9 in)
- Draught: 2.3 m (7 ft 7 in)
- Propulsion: Paxman Valenta 6RP200E diesels; 1,523 shp (1,136 kW); Diesel-electric drive; Combimac electric motors 100kW; Voith Schneider Propellers; Schottel bow thrusters
- Speed: 13 kn (24 km/h; 15 mph)
- Complement: 34 (accommodation for up to 40)
- Sensors & processing systems: Radar Type 1007 I-Band/Kelvin Hughes Ltd SharpEye navigation radar; Sonar Type 2093
- Electronic warfare & decoys: SeaFox mine disposal system; Diver-placed explosive charges
- Armament: 1 × DS30B Mk 1 30 mm gun; 3 × Miniguns (replaced by Browning .50 caliber heavy machine guns as of 2023); 2 × General purpose machine guns

The Sandown class is a class of fifteen minehunters built primarily for the Royal Navy by Vosper Thornycroft. The Sandown class also serve with the Royal Saudi Navy, the Estonian Navy, and the Ukrainian Navy. The first vessel was commissioned into Royal Navy service on 9 June 1989 and all the British ships were named after coastal towns and cities. Although the class had a primary mine countermeasures role, they have had a secondary role as offshore patrol vessels. As of 2025, only one vessel of the class (HMS Bangor) remains in active service with the Royal Navy.

== Development ==
These small (53 m; 174 ft) fibreglass vessels are single role mine hunters (SRMH) rather than minesweepers. Twelve ships were built for the Royal Navy and three ships were exported to Saudi Arabia. Three Royal Navy vessels were decommissioned following the Strategic Defence Review in 2003; Sandown (January 2005), Inverness (April 2005) and Bridport (July 2004). A further ship, Cromer, was decommissioned and transferred to a training role at the Britannia Royal Naval College in Dartmouth in 2001 as Hindostan.

The three decommissioned vessels were sold to Estonia in September 2006. They were re-equipped with TCS (Tactical Control System) and the Atlas Elektronik Seafox ROV for mine disposal. The sonar system was also updated. The first ship (ex-Sandown), delivered in 2007, has been named Admiral Cowan, the second (ex-Inverness), was delivered in 2008 and named Sakala and the last (ex-Bridport) named Ugandi in 2009.

In the 1990s, the design of the Sandown-class was adapted by Spanish company Izar (later Navantia) for the Spanish Navy's six-ship Segura-class minehunters.

== Future ==
The 2021 defence white paper announced that all mine countermeasures vessels in the Royal Navy would be retired during the 2020s and replaced by automated systems. It was indicated that the remaining Sandown-class ships would be retired first with the entire class to be withdrawn from service by 2025. They will be replaced with autonomous minehunting systems and specialized "motherships" deployed by the Royal Navy. While experiencing some delays, the first command and support vessel for trialling autonomous systems (RFA Stirling Castle) entered service, initially with the RFA in Spring 2024, though in 2025 it was indicated that she would be transferred to the navy.

In June 2021, during a visit by HMS Defender to Odesa, it was revealed that an agreement had been reached for two Sandown class ships to be transferred to the Ukrainian Navy upon decommissioning. Pembroke and Blyth were decommissioned on 4 August 2021 and following a refit by Babcock, were to be transferred to the Romanian Navy instead. In September 2023 it was reported that the transfer of Blyth had occurred and that HMS Pembroke would also be transferred to the Romanian Navy in the following year.

In September 2022, HMS Shoreham was spotted operating around Firth of Forth carrying the name Cherkasy (Ukrainian: Черкаси) and the pennant number M311. Though still reportedly in commission with the Royal Navy, she was now training sailors of the Ukrainian Navy prior to also being handed over to that Navy. In October 2022 it was reported that Shoreham had been decommissioned from Royal Navy service. She, and her sister ship ex-HMS Grimsby (now Chernihiv), were formally commissioned into the Ukrainian Navy in July 2023.

In 2025, the decision to retire all the Sandown-class vessels was modified when it was reported that HMS Bangor would be returned to the U.K. from the Persian Gulf to continue in service for a further five years being based out of HMNB Clyde.

The Estonian Navy has noted poor performance of its Sandown-class vessels in ice conditions. In 2026, it was reported that negotiations were underway to acquire four Ice class rated vessels as a replacement.

== Ships in class ==
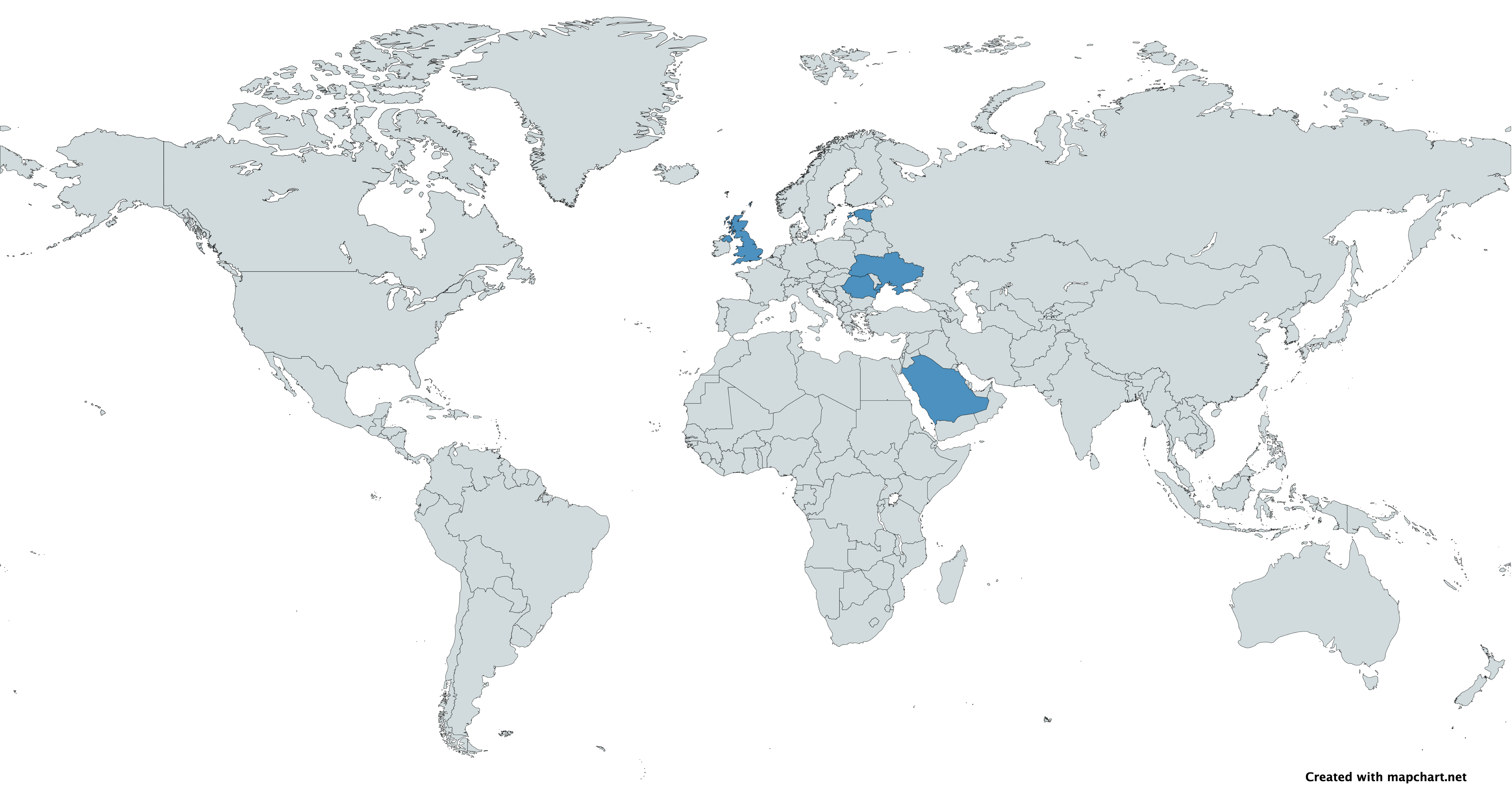
Map with nations whose navies use the Sandown-class minehunter in blue

Navy	Name	Pennant number	Builder	Launched	Commissioned	Status
Royal Navy	Cromer	M103	Vosper Thornycroft	1990	1992	Decommissioned in 2001; transferred to Britannia Royal Naval College as static training ship and renamed Hindostan
Royal Navy	Walney	M104	Vosper Thornycroft	1991	1992	Decommissioned; awaiting disposal
Royal Navy	Penzance	M106	Vosper Thornycroft	1997	1998	Decommissioned
Royal Navy	Bangor	M109	Vosper Thornycroft	1999	2000	In active service
Royal Navy	Ramsey	M110	Vosper Thornycroft	1999	2000	Decommissioned; awaiting disposal Used as parts hulk for Cherkasy / Chernihiv
Royal Saudi Navy	Al Jawf	420	Vosper Thornycroft	1993		In active service
Royal Saudi Navy	Shaqra	422	Vosper Thornycroft	1993		In active service
Royal Saudi Navy	Al Kharj	424	Vosper Thornycroft	1993		In active service
Estonian Navy	Admiral Cowan (ex-Sandown)	M313	Vosper Thornycroft	1988	1989 / 2007	In active service
Estonian Navy	Sakala (ex-Inverness)	M314	Vosper Thornycroft	1990	1991 / 2008	In active service
Estonian Navy	Ugandi (ex-Bridport)	M315	Vosper Thornycroft	1992	1993 / 2009	In active service
Romanian Naval Forces	Sublocotenent Ion Ghiculescu (ex-Blyth)	M270	Vosper Thornycroft	2000	2001 / 2023	In active service
Romanian Naval Forces	Căpitan Constantin Dumitrescu (ex-Pembroke)	M271	Vosper Thornycroft	1997	1998 / 2025	In active service
Ukrainian Navy	Chernihiv (ex Grimsby)	M310	Vosper Thornycroft	1998	1999/2023	Both decommissioned from RN in 2022; transferred to Ukraine's Minesweeper Division in 2023; based at HMNB Portsmouth
Ukrainian Navy	Cherkasy (ex Shoreham)	M311	Vosper Thornycroft	2001	2001/2023	Both decommissioned from RN in 2022; transferred to Ukraine's Minesweeper Division in 2023; based at HMNB Portsmouth

== See also ==
- List of mine countermeasure vessels of the Royal Navy

Equivalent minehunters of the same era

- Avenger class
- Frankenthal class
- Alkmaar class
- Landsort class
- Type 082
- Lerici class

== Bibliography ==
- Beaver, Paul (1996). Britain's Modern Royal Navy. Patrick Stephens Limited. ISBN 1-85260-442-5.
