= M112 =

M112 may refer to:

- M-112 highway (Michigan), a road in the United States
- HMS Shoreham (M112), a British Royal Navy Sandown-class minehunter
- Mercedes-Benz M112 engine, a V6 automobile piston engine family used in the 2000s
- Myasishchev M-112, a cargo-passenger aircraft produced by Myasishchev
- M112, a C-4 demolition charge
