= 1st Minesweeper Division =

1st Minesweeper Division 1st Naval Guard and Patrol Division 1st Security and Support Division (1997-2018)
- 1-й дивізіон кораблів охорони рейду
- Division Insignia
- Active: 1997 - present
- Country: Ukraine
- Branch: Ukrainian Navy
- Type: Division
- Role: Naval patrols, Coastal reconnaissance, anti sabotage operations, minesweeping
- Part of: Armed Forces of Ukraine
- Garrison/HQ: Western Naval Base
- Engagements: Russo-Ukrainian War: War in Donbas; Kerch Strait incident; Russian invasion of Ukraine

Insignia
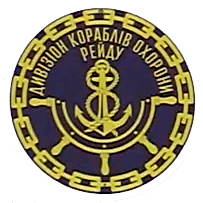
- Former Insignia

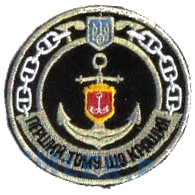
- Former Insignia

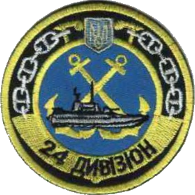
- 24th Separate River Boats Division Insignia

The 1st Mine countermeasures Division formerly the 1st Naval Guard and Patrol Division and the 1st Security and Support Division is a division of the Ukrainian Navy, established in 1997 it is concerned with the defense of Ukrainian coast and guarding of the installations of the Ukrainian Navy. It is garrisoned at the Western Naval Base. It also inducted two British and two Dutch minesweepers following the Russian invasion of Ukraine.

== History ==
The 1st Division was established in 1997 as the 1st Security and Support Division of the Ukrainian Navy.

In 2011, the vessel Skadovsk was transferred from the 73rd Naval Special Operations Center to the 1st Division and was recognized as the best vessel of the 1st Division.

In January 2013, the 24th Separate River Boats Division was established and was to be equipped with Gyurza-M-class gunboats. Similar vessels from the 1st Division were transferred to the 24th division from Western Naval Base for the training and operations till the new vessels were delivered to the division.

On February 7, 2013, during a combat training exercise, the ship Hola Prystan of the division rescued a ship destroyed by an emergency response team.

In 2014, the 24th Separate River Boats Division was disbanded and all its vessels and personnel were transferred to the 1st Division.

On September 9, 2016, the gunboat Berdyansk of the division along with another gunboat Akkerman accompanied by Hetman Sahaidachnyi discovered a Russian anti-submarine ship Smetlyvy. So Hetman Sahaidachny set up a smoke screen and the gunboats encircled the Russian ship and it was forced to retreat.

On 1 July 2018, four newly built gunboats were incorporated into the division after a ceremony and training exercises were carried out.

On 25 November 2018, two vessels of the first division Berdyansk Nikopol and a tugboat Yany Kapu attempted to travel from the Black Sea port of Odesa in south-western Ukraine to the Azov Sea port of Mariupol in eastern Ukraine but were intercepted by Russian warships and were all captured in the ensuing Kerch Strait incident. The captured vessels were returned to Ukraine on November 18, 2019, near Cape Tarkhankut and were towed to Ochakiv on November 20, 2019.

In November 2022, during the Russo-Ukrainian War, the vessel Nikopol of the division was damaged by a Russian ZALA Lancet attack.

On 2 July 2023, HMS Shoreham was commissioned into the Ukrainian Navy as Cherkasy, in honour of the minesweeper that was lost during the Russian annexation of Crimea in 2014, HMS Grimsby was also inducted as Chernihiv. The ceremony was held in Glasgow. On 2 July 2023, the Ukrainian Navy announced planning to establish a mine countermeasures division on the basis of the 1st division. The two Ukrainian Sandown-class minehunters were to be the first minesweepers of this division, with two Alkmaar-class minehunters from the Netherlands also being inducted into the division. The mobile minesweeper units of the Ukrainian Navy were already conducting minesweeping operations. In April 2024, it was indicated that Cherkasy and her sister ship Chernihiv were to be based at HMNB Portsmouth for the "foreseeable future as they prepare for exercises with the Royal Navy alongside the US Navy in UK waters, which will help Ukraine understand how to operate with NATO navies". Two Dutch Alkmaar-class minehunters, HNLMS Vlaardingen and HNLMS Makkum, were officially pledged to Ukraine in 2024. In June 2025, the Alkmaar-class minehunter Vlaardingen was donated to the Ukrainian Navy and renamed Melitopol. A second Alkmaar-class minehunter, HNLMS Makkum was to be donated to Ukrainian Navy later in 2025, and was to be renamed Henichesk. In April 2025, Cherkasy and Chernihiv passed Level 1 NATO interoperability assessment.

== Vessels ==
- Skadovsk (P170) (Gunboat)
- Rivne (P172) (Gunboat)
- AK-02 (P173) (Gunboat)
- Berdyansk (P175) (Gunboat)
- Nikopol (P176) (Gunboat)
- Kostopil (P180) (Gunboat)
- Hola Prystan (P241) (Ant-Sabotage Ship)
- Southern (A855) (Command ship)
- Cherkasy (formerly HMS Shoreham (M112))
- Chernihiv (formerly HMS Grimsby (M108))
- Melitopol (formerly HLMS Vlaardingen)
- Henichesk (formerly HLMS Makkum)

== Commanders ==
- Bayura Valentin Valentinovych (?-2007)
- Kodymsky Roman Mykolayovych (2008–2012)
- Ihor Viktorovych Martynenko (2013–2017)
- Denys Hrytsenko (2018-)
