= HMS Grimsby (M108) =

Sandown-class Single Role Mine Hunter (SRMH) of the Royal Navy

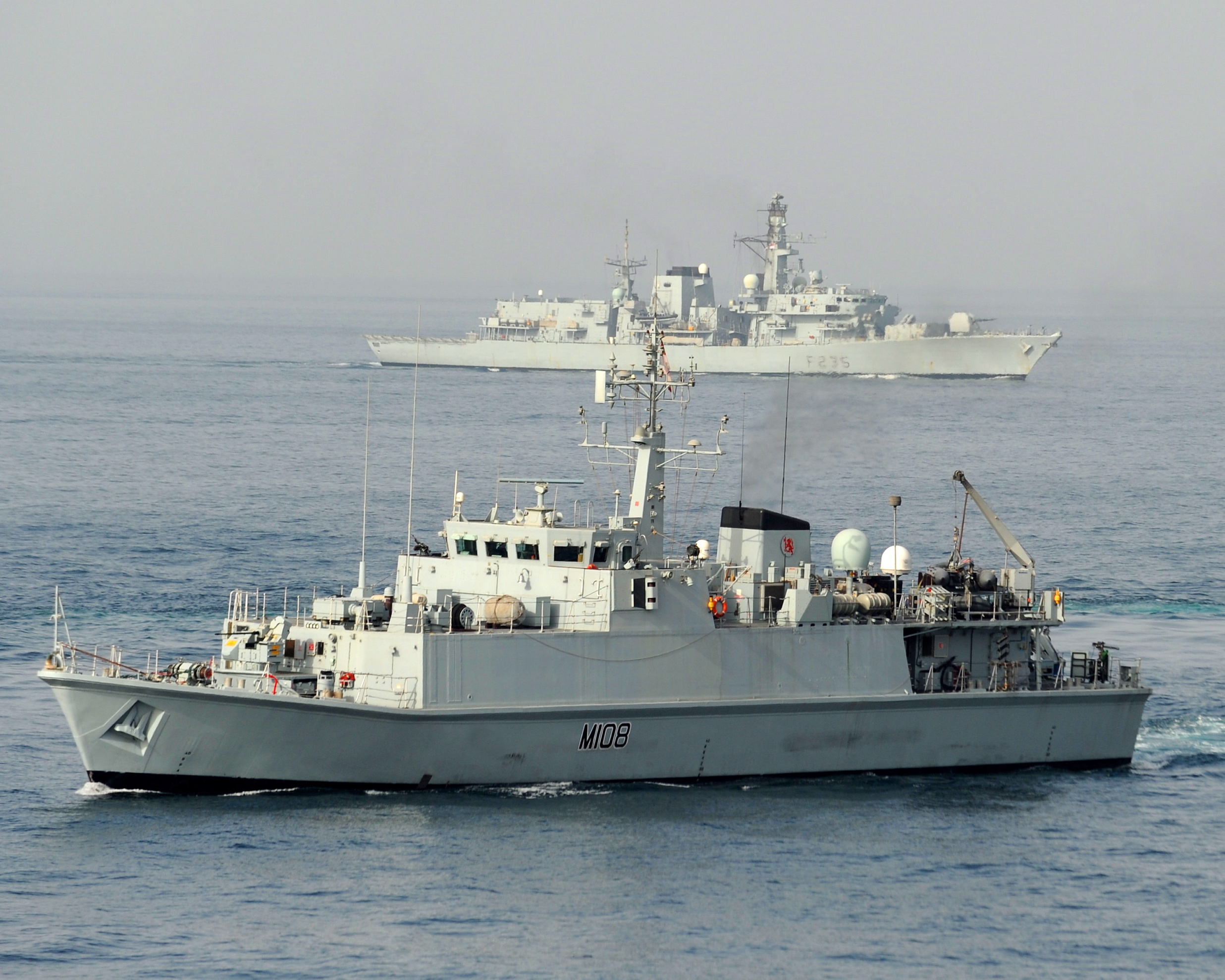
- HMS Grimsby, 2011

History

United Kingdom
- Name: HMS Grimsby
- Operator: Royal Navy
- Builder: Vosper Thornycroft
- Launched: 10 August 1998
- Commissioned: 25 September 1999
- Decommissioned: October 2022
- Refit: Rosyth Royal Dockyard 2007
- Identification: IMO number: 4906771; MMSI number: 234597000; Callsign: GCUK; Pennant number: M108
- Status: Decommissioned, transferred to Ukraine as Chernihiv

General characteristics
- Class & type: Sandown-class minehunter
- Displacement: 600 t (590 long tons)
- Length: 52.5 m (172 ft 3 in)
- Beam: 10.9 m (35 ft 9 in)
- Draught: 2.3 m (7 ft 7 in)
- Propulsion: Paxman Valenta 6RP200E diesels 1523 shp, diesel-electric drive, Voith Schneider Propellers, Schottel bow thrusters
- Speed: 13 kn (24 km/h; 15 mph)
- Complement: 34 (accommodation for up to 40)
- Sensors & processing systems: Radar Type 1007 I-Band; Sonar Type 2093
- Electronic warfare & decoys: SeaFox mine disposal system; Diver-placed explosive charges
- Armament: 1 × 30mm DS30M Mk2 gun; 2 × Miniguns; 3 × General purpose machine guns

HMS Grimsby is a Sandown-class minehunter, the second ship in Royal Navy service to bear the name. In 2023, along with her sister ship HMS Shoreham, she was transferred to Ukrainian Navy service under the name Chernihiv.

== Construction and design ==
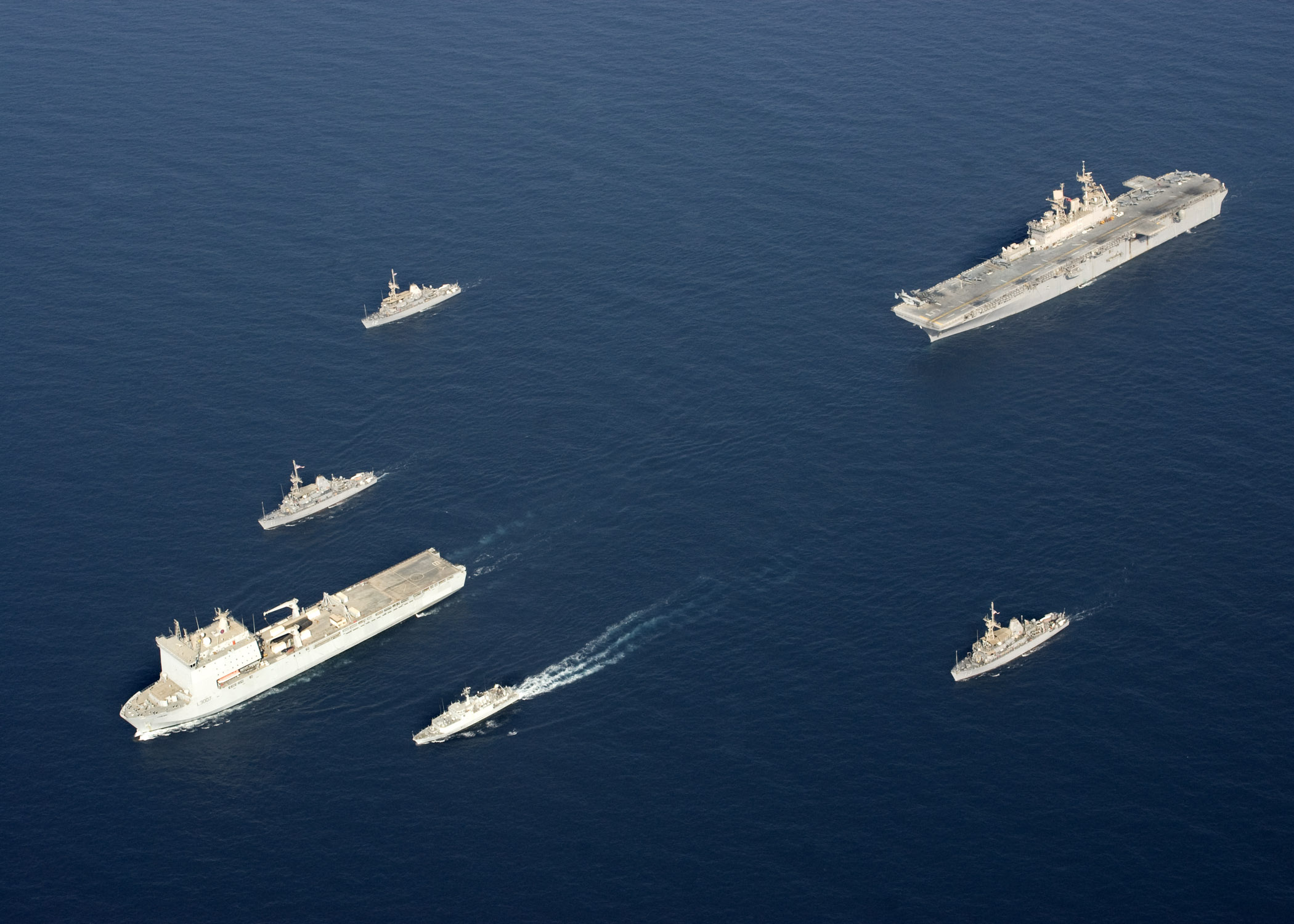
Sailing in September 2009 with RFA Lyme Bay and USS Bataan

She was built by Vosper Thornycroft, in Woolston, Hampshire, and commissioned in 1999. The class was originally named as the Single Role Minehunter and was planned to complement the capabilities of the preceding Hunt class and to be cheaper to build. Sandown-class MCMVs are highly manoeuvrable vessels due to being fitted with Voith-Schneider propulsors allowing rapid turning at slow speeds or whilst stationary. Armament is primarily for self-defence against an asymmetric warfare threat although a point defence capability exists. The fit of two Mk44 miniguns has greatly improved the ship's force protection ability.

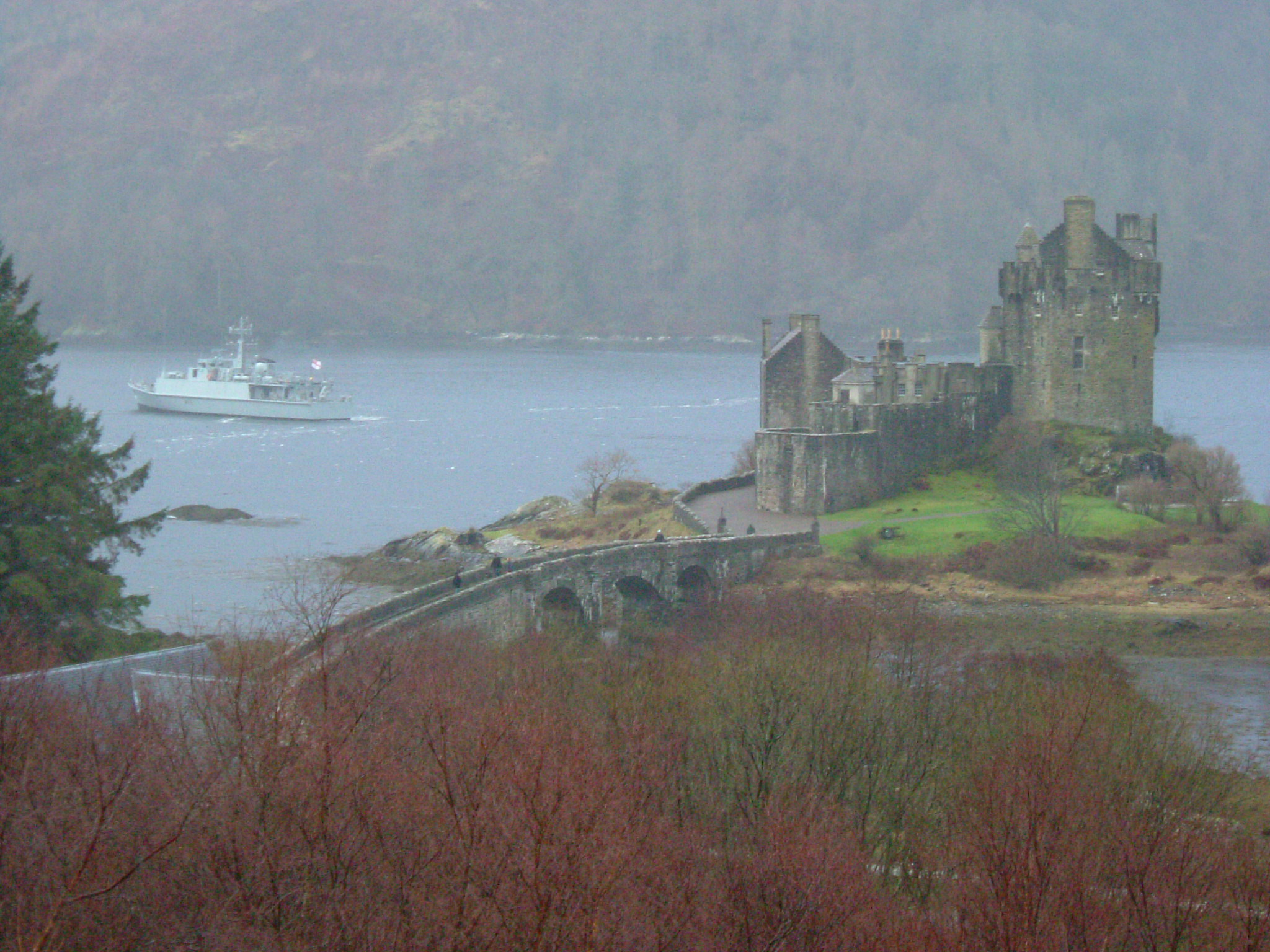
Off Eilan Donan Castle in 2004

== Service history ==
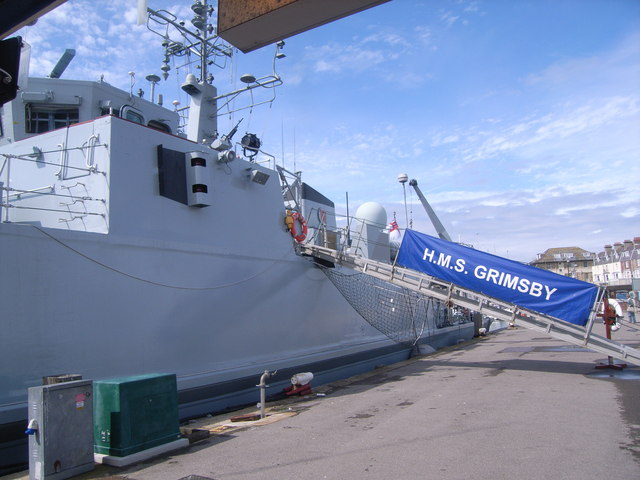
Berthed in Weymouth in June 2008

Grimsby was part of Mine Counter Measures Squadron 1 based at HMNB Clyde, Faslane, on the Gare Loch.

On 24 January 2002, while her divers were searching for a 500 lb (230 kg) bomb in Gibraltar, she was approached by the Spanish patrol boat Conejera, which refused to leave when asked by the crew of HMS Ranger, claiming they were in Spanish waters.

At 2 am on 29 September 2004 the 480-ton craft lost power and drifted into the ferry Duchess M (Gravesend to Tilbury), owned by the Lower Thames and Medway Passenger Boat Company in Gravesend, also damaging their Princess Pocahontas.

Overseas deployments were varied including regular participation in Exercise Cold Response (Norway) and as part of Standing NATO Force Mediterranean (Standing NATO Maritime Group 2). More recently the focus had been in support of OP TELIC Roulement in the Persian Gulf.

In 2010 the ship was based in Bahrain. In 2012 she entered a six-month Support Period (Docking) at HMNB Rosyth which included replacing the entire fire detection system, upgraded communications systems and habitability improvements.

In early September 2022, the ship was reported as likely to be decommissioned and transferred to Ukraine and in October 2022 it was reported that her decommissioning had occurred.

=== Ukrainian service ===
She was commissioned into the Ukrainian Navy's Minesweeper Division as Chernihiv in July 2023 in a ceremony held in Glasgow. In April 2024, it was indicated that Chernihiv and her sister ship Cherkasy were to be based at HMNB Portsmouth for the "foreseeable future as they prepare for exercises with the Royal Navy alongside the US Navy in UK waters, which will help Ukraine understand how to operate with NATO navies".

== Affiliations ==
She was affiliated to her home town of Grimsby, North East Lincolnshire and with local organisations such as Grimsby Town F.C., and the Grimsby and Cleethorpes Sea Cadet Unit. Other affiliations include the Grimsby Royal British Legion, Grimsby Royal Naval Association and Old Cleethorpes Royal Naval Association.

The ship's sponsor was Lady Candice Blackham.

== See also ==
- List of mine countermeasure vessels of the Royal Navy
- List of active Royal Navy ships
