= HMS Pembroke (M107) =

1998 Sandown-class minehunter of the Royal Navy

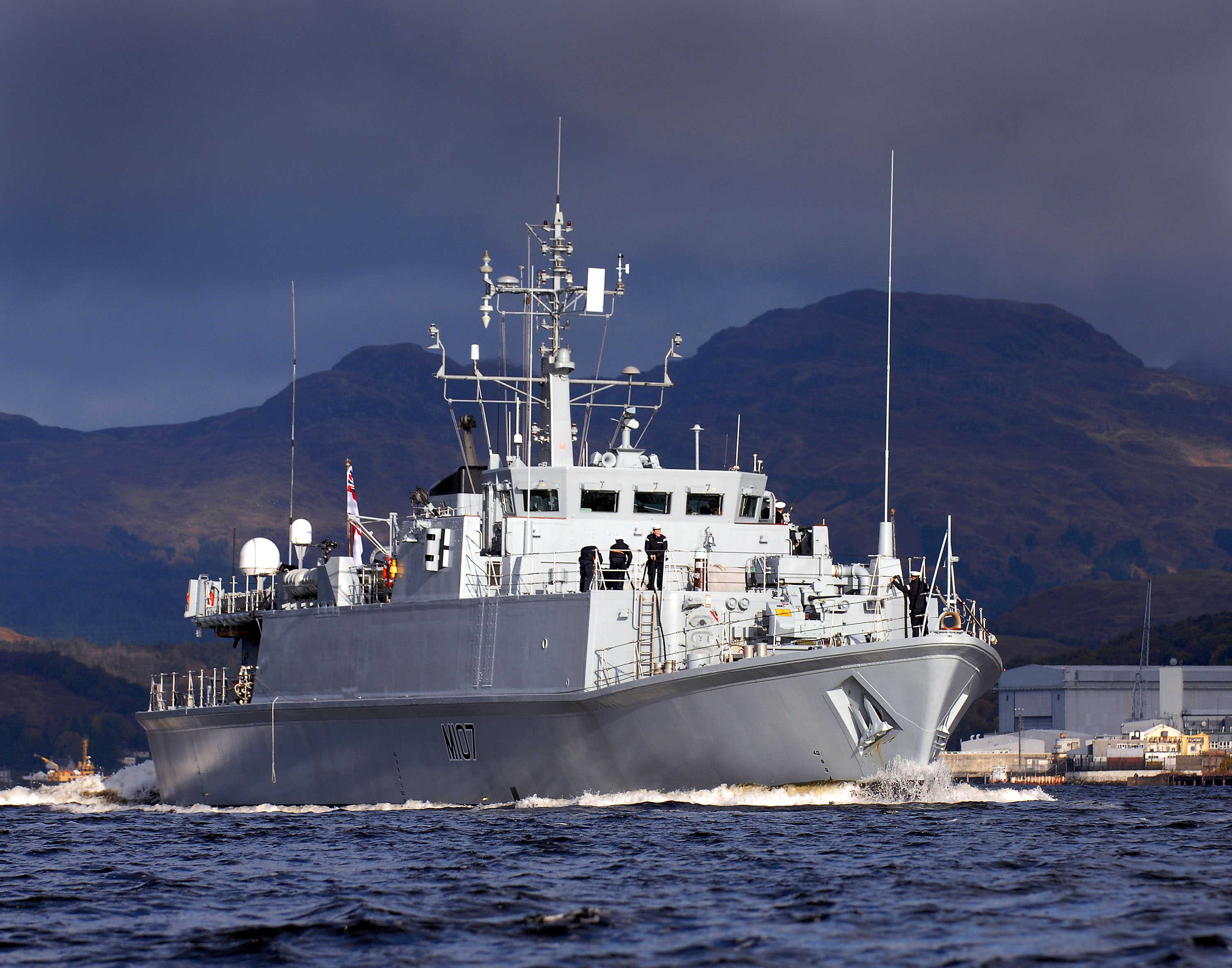
- HMS Pembroke in 2008

History

United Kingdom
- Name: HMS Pembroke
- Operator: Royal Navy
- Builder: Vosper Thornycroft
- Launched: 12 December 1997
- Commissioned: 6 October 1998
- Home port: HMNB Clyde
- Identification: IMO number: 4906769; MMSI number: 234625000; Callsign: GCUJ; Pennant number: M107
- Status: Decommissioned

Romania
- Name: Căpitan Constantin Dumitrescu
- Namesake: Constantin Dumitrescu
- Acquired: 29 September 2023
- Commissioned: 4 August 2025
- Identification: MMSI number: 264800099; Callsign: YQYU; Pennant number: M271
- Status: In active service

General characteristics
- Class & type: Sandown-class minehunter
- Displacement: 600 t (590 long tons; 660 short tons)
- Length: 52.5 m (172 ft 3 in)
- Beam: 10.9 m (35 ft 9 in)
- Draught: 2.3 m (7 ft 7 in)
- Installed power: 1,523 shp (1,136 kW); 2 × Paxman Valenta 6RP200E diesel, diesel-electric drive
- Propulsion: 2 × Schottel bow thrusters; Voith Schneider Propellers
- Speed: 13 kn (24 km/h; 15 mph)
- Complement: 34 (accommodation for up to 40)
- Sensors & processing systems: Radar Type 1007 I-Band; Sonar Type 2093
- Electronic warfare & decoys: Seafox mine disposal system; Diver-placed explosive charges
- Armament: In British service: 1 × 30mm DS30B S30GM1; 2 × Miniguns (may be replaced by Browning .50 caliber heavy machine guns as of 2023); 3 × General purpose machine guns; In Romanian service: 1 × 30mm DS30B S30GM1; 2 × DShK heavy machine guns

Căpitan Constantin Dumitrescu (M271) is a Sandown-class minehunter of the Romanian Naval Forces, officially entering service on 4 August 2025. Before its retiring in 2023, she served as HMS Pembroke of the Royal Navy (RN), the second ship launched from the class' second batch, with several improvements over the first five built.

Posted for three years to the Persian Gulf between 2009 and 2012, Pembroke was later deployed in international exercises and historic unexploded ordnance detection in home waters. She was the first of the RN Mine Countermeasures Vessels fitted with the Oceanographic Reconnaissance Combat Architecture system which replaced the previous NAUTIS system in early 2020.

As part of RN plans to replace all mine countermeasures vessels with autonomous uncrewed vessels, a decommissioning service and Freedom of Pembroke parade was held on 23 July 2023. After news that Pembroke was to be transferred to Romania, it was also announced that she was to be renamed M271 Căpitan Constantin Dumitrescu.

== Design and description ==
The Sandown-class minehunter was designed to complement the existing Hunt-class mine countermeasures vessel, by providing a cheaper alternative and specific mine hunting service. The Sandown-class vessels were delivered in two batches, with the first five ships delivered by Vosper Thornycroft to the Royal Navy by November 1994. The company was then awarded the contract for a second batch of seven vessels, of which Pembroke was the second.

Ships of the Sandown-class had a hull constructed from glass reinforced plastic, and equipment on-board have a low magnetic signature. While under normal circumstances, the ship operates on diesel engines, when operating near mines she uses an electric drive system. In addition to the bow thrusters, she is also equipped with a Voith Schneider cyclorotor. Further anti-mine equipment includes the Seafox mine disposal system. Ships of the class were each equipped with a single 30mm DS30M Mk2 gun.

== Construction ==
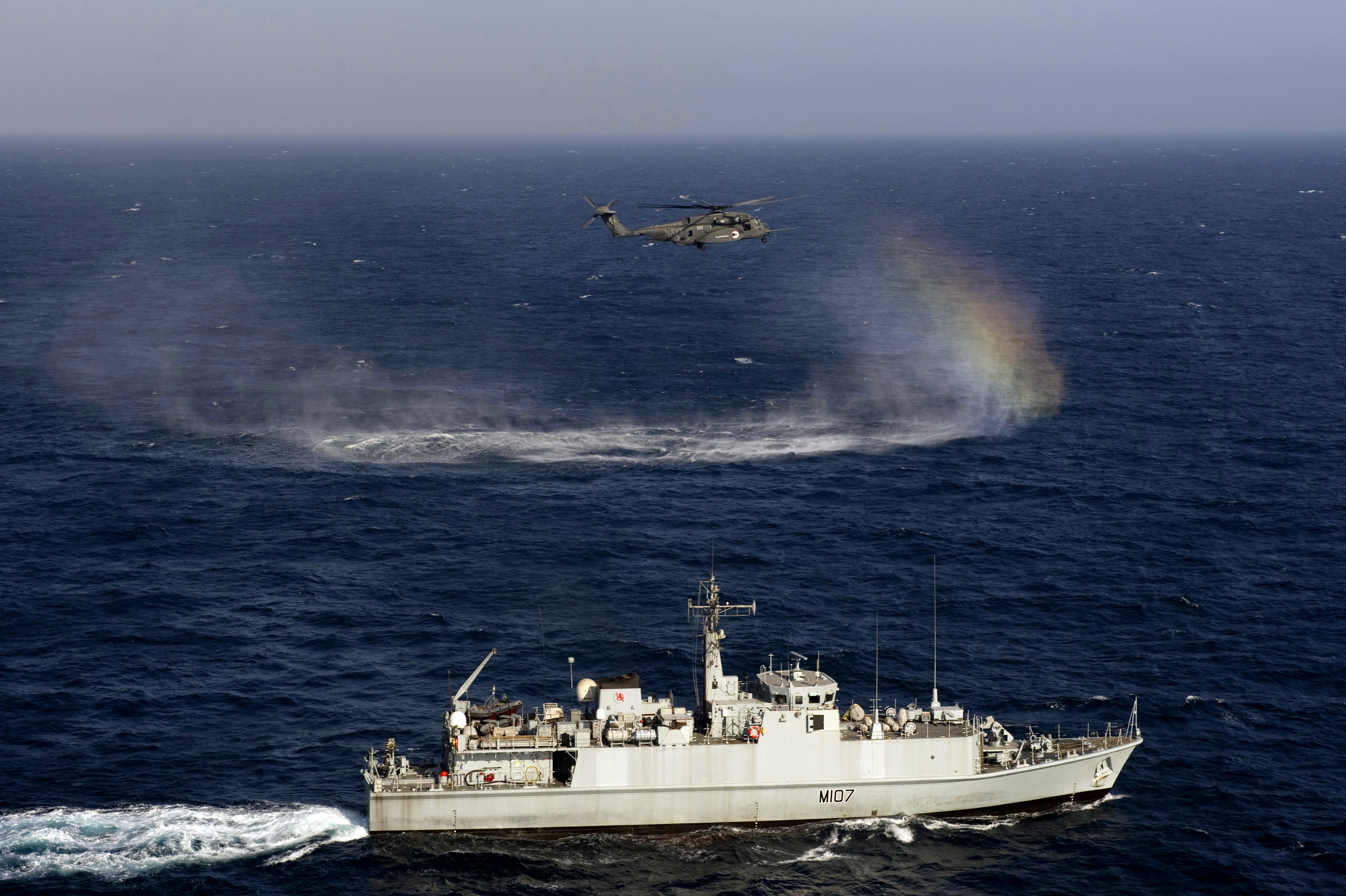
Pembroke operating in the Persian Gulf, 2011

Pembroke was constructed at the Vosper Thornycroft in Southampton, England. She was used for shock trials on the improvements made to the second batch of Sandown-class minehunters.

== Operational history ==
=== With the Royal Navy ===
Pembroke was posted to Persian Gulf duties in 2009, and spent the following three years conducting operations and exercises there. In 2012, she returned to HMNB Clyde. On the way, she and Middleton provided assistance to Delhi Express, a cargo vessel which had lost power while transiting the Gulf of Aden. Pembroke and Middleton protected the ship until it was under way once more, as the area is known for piracy. During the mission to the gulf, the ship had been crewed by seven different teams. Upon returning to Faslane, she was placed in dry dock for two months for maintenance.

Pembroke underwent a six-month period of support work and upgrades by Babcock International. The upgrades included the installation of the Defence Information Infrastructure, which allows for information sharing across the entire defence network. Further work was taken to upgrade the high pressure air system as well as installing an expanded fire detection system. The work was completed by early 2014, when the ship underwent further sea trials.

After a 300-pound (140-kilogram) mine was dredged up by a fishing boat in 2014, Pembroke detonated the mine using a Seafox anti-mine drone. In 2015, she spent four months cooperating in operations with ships from the German, Polish, Belgian and Royal Dutch navies. During this time she located nine Second World War bombs, including a 500-pound (230 kg) bomb in the North Sea. On 26 March, she visited the wreck site of the I-class destroyer HMS Isis and conducted a remembrance and wreath laying ceremony. In preparation for a deployment to the Baltic Sea in April 2016, earlier that year, Pembroke took part in a series of training exercises including simulated attack by aircraft, gunnery, salvage and mine hunting.

=== With Romanian Navy ===
After she was decommissioned in 2023, it was announced that Pembroke along with Blyth were sold to Romania in the same year. Initially, it was announced that Blyth and Ramsey were to be delivered, however, it was reported that Ramsey might be in a worse shape than thought, leading to the swap. Blyth was commissioned into Romanian service as Sublocotenent Ion Ghiculescu on 27 September 2023, and was to be followed by Pembroke in the spring of 2024.

The commissioning of the ship was however announced that it will take place in the summer of 2025, an information confirmed by Maria Eagle, the Minister of State for Defence Procurement and Industry. Pembroke was commissioned as Căpitan Constantin Dumitrescu on 4 August 2025 at Rosyth in Scotland, in the presence of the Romanian Navy Commander Vice Admiral Mihai Panait and the Commander Operations of the Royal Navy Major-General Rich Cantrill.
