= HMS Portland (F79) =

2001 Type 23 or Duke-class frigate of the Royal Navy

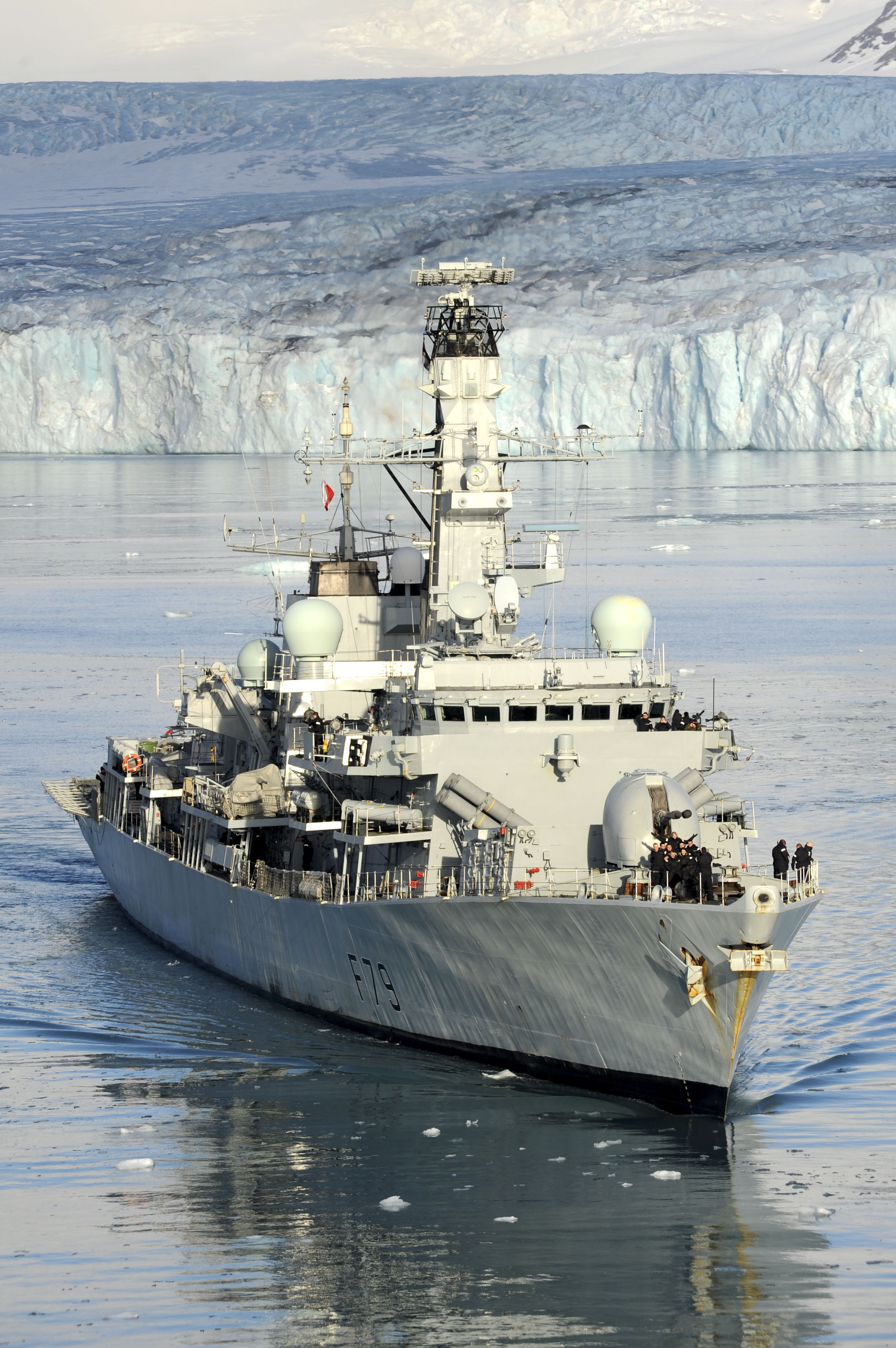
- HMS Portland, 2010

History

United Kingdom
- Name: Portland
- Operator: Royal Navy
- Ordered: February 1996
- Builder: Marconi Marine, Clyde
- Laid down: 14 January 1998
- Launched: 15 May 1999
- Sponsored by: Lady Brigstocke
- Commissioned: 3 May 2001
- Refit: LIFEX 2018 - 2021
- Home port: HMNB Devonport, Plymouth
- Identification: IMO number: 8949733; MMSI number: 239627000; International call sign: GDIS
- Motto: Craignez Honte; "Fear Dishonour"
- Status: In active service
- Badge

General characteristics
- Class & type: Type 23 Frigate
- Displacement: 4,900 t (4,800 long tons; 5,400 short tons)
- Length: 133 m (436 ft 4 in)
- Beam: 16.1 m (52 ft 10 in)
- Draught: 7.3 m (23 ft 11 in)
- Propulsion: CODLAG: Four 1510 kW (2,025 shp) Paxman Valenta 12CM diesel generators; Two GEC electric motors delivering 2980kW (4000 shp); Two Rolls-Royce Spey SM1C delivering 23,190 kW (31,100 shp)
- Speed: In excess of 28 kn (52 km/h; 32 mph)
- Range: 7,500 nautical miles (14,000 km) at 15 kn (28 km/h)
- Complement: 185 (accommodation for up to 205)
- Sensors & processing systems: Sonar 2087
- Electronic warfare & decoys: UAF-1 ESM, or, UAT Mod 1; Seagnat; Type 182 towed torpedo decoy; Surface Ship Torpedo Defence
- Armament: Anti-air missiles: 1 × 32-cell GWS 35 Vertical Launching System (VLS) for: 32 × Sea Ceptor missiles (1–25+ km); Anti-ship missiles: 2 × quad Naval Strike Missile; Anti-submarine torpedoes: 2 × twin 12.75 in (324 mm) Sting Ray torpedo tubes; Guns: 1 × BAE 4.5 inch Mk 8 naval gun; 2 × 30 mm DS30M Mk2 guns, or, 2 × 30 mm DS30B guns; 2 × Miniguns (retired 2023 and replaced by M2 Browning .50 calibre heavy machine guns); 4 × General-purpose machine gun
- Aircraft carried: 1 × Wildcat HMA2, armed with: 4 × Sea Venom anti-ship missiles (initial operating capability from October 2025; full operating capability projected from 2026), or, 2 × Sting Ray anti-submarine torpedoes, or; 20 × Martlet multirole missiles (from 2021); Mk 11 depth charges; or; 1 × Westland Merlin HM2, armed with; 4 × anti submarine torpedoes
- Aviation facilities: Flight deck; Enclosed hangar

HMS Portland is a Type 23 frigate of the British Royal Navy. She is the eighth ship to bear the name and is the fifteenth and penultimate ship of the "Duke" class of frigates. She is named after the currently extinct Dukedom of Portland, and more particularly for the third duke, who was prime minister.

== Operational history ==
=== 2000–2010 ===
The ship was accepted into service by the Royal Navy on 15 December 2000 and was commissioned on 3 May the following year. Present at the commissioning ceremony was Portland's sponsor Lady Brigstocke, wife of Admiral Sir John Brigstocke, a former Second Sea Lord; Lady Brigstocke launched the ship in 1999.

During sea trials Portland attained a top speed of 30.8 knots (57.0 km/h), the fastest speed attained by any Type 23 frigate at that time.

Portland's Lynx helicopter (XZ724) was lost at sea on 8 December 2004. The aircraft had been launched following the potential sighting of a man overboard. All four crew were killed, including Lieutenant David Cole RN, the flight commander, who had embarked to augment the duty crew.

Portland assisted in the search for men lost from a capsized yacht on 3 February 2007.

She was deployed to the Caribbean for seven months in 2007, intercepting 3.5 tonnes of cocaine in cooperation with a United States Coast Guard Law Enforcement Detachment (LEDET) and conducting disaster relief in Belize following Hurricane Dean.

In April 2008, Portland visited Liverpool with HMS Mersey and berthed at the cruise liner terminal at Prince's Dock.

In June 2009 while taking part in anti-piracy operations off the Horn of Africa, Portland intercepted ten alleged pirates but because the suspects were not caught in the immediate act of piracy, the vessel was unable legally to detain them.

In late April 2010, Portland relieved HMS York on the Atlantic Patrol Task (South).

=== 2011–2021 ===
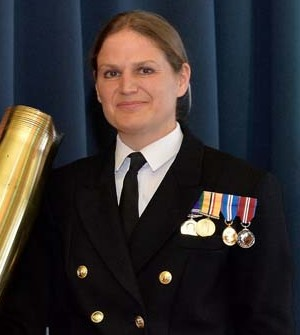
Commander Sarah West in 2013

June 2011 saw Portland conducting night Naval Gunnery practice off Gibraltar in the Mediterranean. Towards the end of the month she sailed to Edinburgh to take part in Armed Forces Day. She was the first major warship in the Royal Navy to be commanded by a woman: Commander Sarah West assumed command of HMS Portland on 21 May 2012, but was relieved of command in July 2014 following an alleged affair with one of the ship's officers.

Portland spent 2012 at Rosyth in a 50-week refit that saw her upgraded with Sonar 2087, new IT systems, Sea Wolf mid-life overhaul, gun replacements, galley refurbishment and accommodation improvements. She left Rosyth on 14 December 2012 for three months of sea trials.

In August 2013, she was announced as the Fleet Ready Escort for the next two months. She participated in Exercise Joint Warrior 2013.

On 2 August 2014, she completed the 7-month task of the Atlantic Patrol ship.

On 20 June 2016, Portland departed Devonport for a nine-month patrol covering the Middle East and the South Atlantic Ocean. Portland was the last Royal Navy ship to carry Radar 996 and was the last ship to conduct a Replenishment at Sea with RFA Gold Rover prior to the latter ship's decommissioning

In 2018, Portland began a Life Extension (LIFEX) refit at Babcock's Frigate Support Centre in Devonport. Her refit included the installation of the Sea Ceptor surface-to-air missile system, 997 surveillance radar, 1084 navigational radar and the 2150 hull-mounted sonar. She returned to sea in March 2021.

=== 2022–present ===
In 2022, Portland spent 152 days at sea.

In 2023, Portland and USS Porter were present at Halifax's fleet week, making it the city's first international fleet week.

From February 2024, Portland participated in Steadfast Defender 2024 as part of the UK Carrier Strike Group.

Participated in Exercise Strike Warrior in the North Sea, in October 2024.

In December 2024, it was reported that Portland had become the second Royal Navy ship to be fitted with Naval Strike Missiles to serve as an anti-ship surface to surface weapon, and as an interim replacement for the Harpoon missiles, but that they can also be programmed to be used in the land attack role.

== Affiliations ==
- Irish Guards
- The Royal Wessex Yeomanry
- Worshipful Company of Scriveners
- Worshipful Company of Masons
- Dorset Chamber of Commerce
- Earl of Portland
- Cambridge URNU
- Winsford Middlewich & Northwich Sea Cadets
