= Romanian minehunter Sublocotenent Ion Ghiculescu =

Sandown-class minehunter

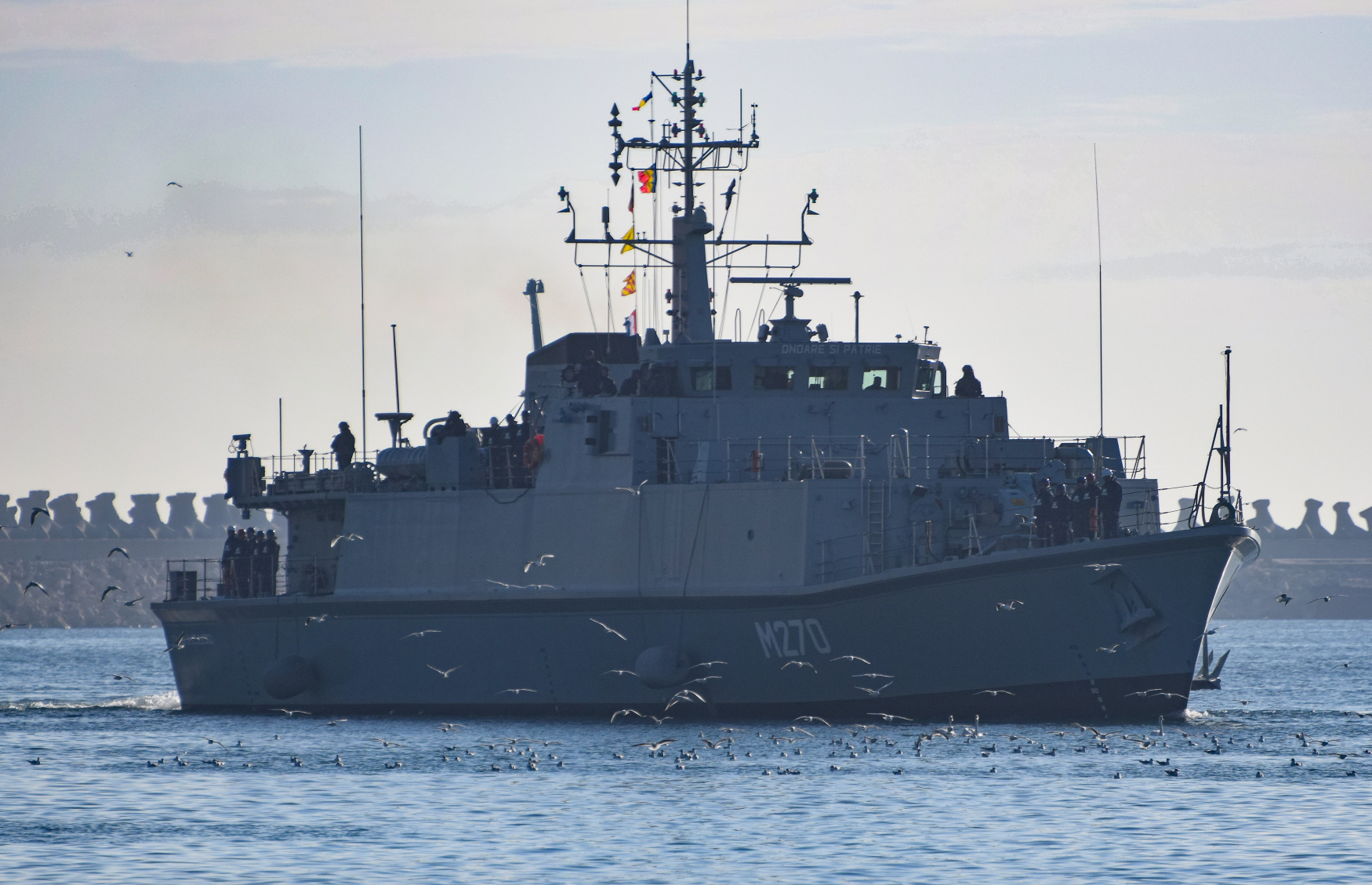
- The arrival Sublocotenent Ion Ghiculescu in Constanța

History

United Kingdom
- Name: Blyth
- Builder: Vosper Thornycroft
- Launched: 4 July 2000
- Commissioned: 19 July 2001
- Decommissioned: 4 August 2021
- Identification: IMO number: 4906800; MMSI number: 234572000; Callsign: GCUN; Pennant number: M111
- Status: Transferred to Romania

Romania
- Name: Sublocotenent Ion Ghiculescu
- Namesake: Ion Ghiculescu
- Acquired: October 2022
- Commissioned: 27 September 2023
- Identification: MMSI number: 264800098; Callsign: YQYT; Pennant number: M270
- Status: In active service

General characteristics
- Class & type: Sandown-class minehunter
- Displacement: 600 t (590 long tons)
- Length: 52.5 m (172 ft 3 in)
- Beam: 10.9 m (35 ft 9 in)
- Draught: 2.3 m (7 ft 7 in)
- Installed power: 1,523 shp (1,136 kW); 2 × Paxman Valenta 6RP200E diesel, diesel-electric drive
- Propulsion: 2 × Schottel bow thrusters; Voith Schneider Propellers
- Speed: 13 knots (24 km/h; 15 mph)
- Complement: 34 (accommodation for up to 40)
- Sensors & processing systems: Radar Type 1007 I-Band; Sonar Type 2093
- Electronic warfare & decoys: SeaFox mine disposal system; REMUS autonomous sonar system; Diver-placed explosive charges
- Armament: 1 × 30 mm DS30M Mk2 gun; 2 × miniguns; 3 × general purpose machine guns

Sublocotenent Ion Ghiculescu (M270) is a Sandown-class minehunter of the Romanian Naval Forces. She was built as HMS Blyth (M111), for the Royal Navy, the eleventh of this class of twelve Single-Role Minehunters (SRMH) ships. She was laid down on 30 May 1999 by Vosper Thornycroft at their Woolston, Southampton shipyard, launched in May 2000 and entered service for the Royal Navy in February 2001. She was the second vessel to carry this name, the first being a Bangor-class minesweeper of the Second World War, wearing pennant number J15. Blyth served in the Middle East as part of the 9th Mine Countermeasures Squadron.

== Service history ==
=== With the Royal Navy ===
HMS Blyth was deployed to the Middle East on Operation Aintree by the Royal Navy in 2007 and 2008, together with her sister ship, HMS Ramsey, to test the class capabilities in the hot climate and maintain force operational capability in the region. Crews from other Sandown-class vessels were rotated through the two ships.

Blyth was based at HMS Jufair as one of four minehunters of 9th Mine Countermeasures Squadron supported by a Royal Fleet Auxiliary Bay-class landing ship on Operation Kipion until 2020, when she was replaced in theatre by HMS Penzance.

On 27 November 2020 the Royal Navy announced that the commanding officer of Blyth had been awarded the MBE for his leadership in Gulf peacekeeping efforts.

On 10 February 2021, the Royal Navy announced that Blyth was being re-deployed to link-up with the Dutch-led NATO force operating in the North Sea. Blyth (together with Ramsey) was decommissioned in a joint ceremony at Rosyth on 4 August 2021. Following a refit by Babcock both vessels were initially earmarked for the Ukrainian Navy to "enjoy a fresh lease of life in the Black Sea". However, in October 2022 it was reported that plan had subsequently altered to transfer both ships to the Romanian Navy instead.

On 28 September 2023, the Royal Navy confirmed that Sandown-class mine countermeasures vessels, Blyth and HMS Pembroke, had been sold to Romania, one of the UK's NATO allies, by the Defence Equipment Sales Authority (DESA), which disposes of vehicles and equipment no longer needed by UK Armed Forces.

=== With Romanian Navy ===
Ex-Blyth was officially taken over by the Romanian Navy during a ceremony that took place at Rosyth on 27 September 2023. She was renamed Sublocotenent Ion Ghiculescu, a name also carried by the World War II gunboat NMS Sublocotenent Ghiculescu, and received the pennant number M270. The crew of 40 sailors under the command of Lieutenant-Commander Denis Giubernea, continued training, evaluation, and certification activities until 15 November when the ship departed Rosyth for Constanța. Sublocotenent Ion Ghiculescu arrived in the port of Constanța on 19 December 2023. She joined up with the 146th Mining-Demining Ships Divizion.

On 10 June 2025, Sublocotenent Ion Ghiculescu transporting a team of explosive ordnance disposal divers, began participating in the fifth activation of the Mine Counter-Measures Black Sea Task Group. Together with another three ships from Bulgaria and Turkey, she maintained maritime traffic safety, ensuring the freedom of navigation. She also participated in the Eurasian Partnership Mine Counter Measure Dive 25 organized by the Romanian Navy between 14 and 22 June. Sublocotenent Ion Ghiculescu returned to port on 27 June.
