= HMS Chiddingfold (M37) =

1984 Hunt-class mine countermeasures vessel of the Royal Navy

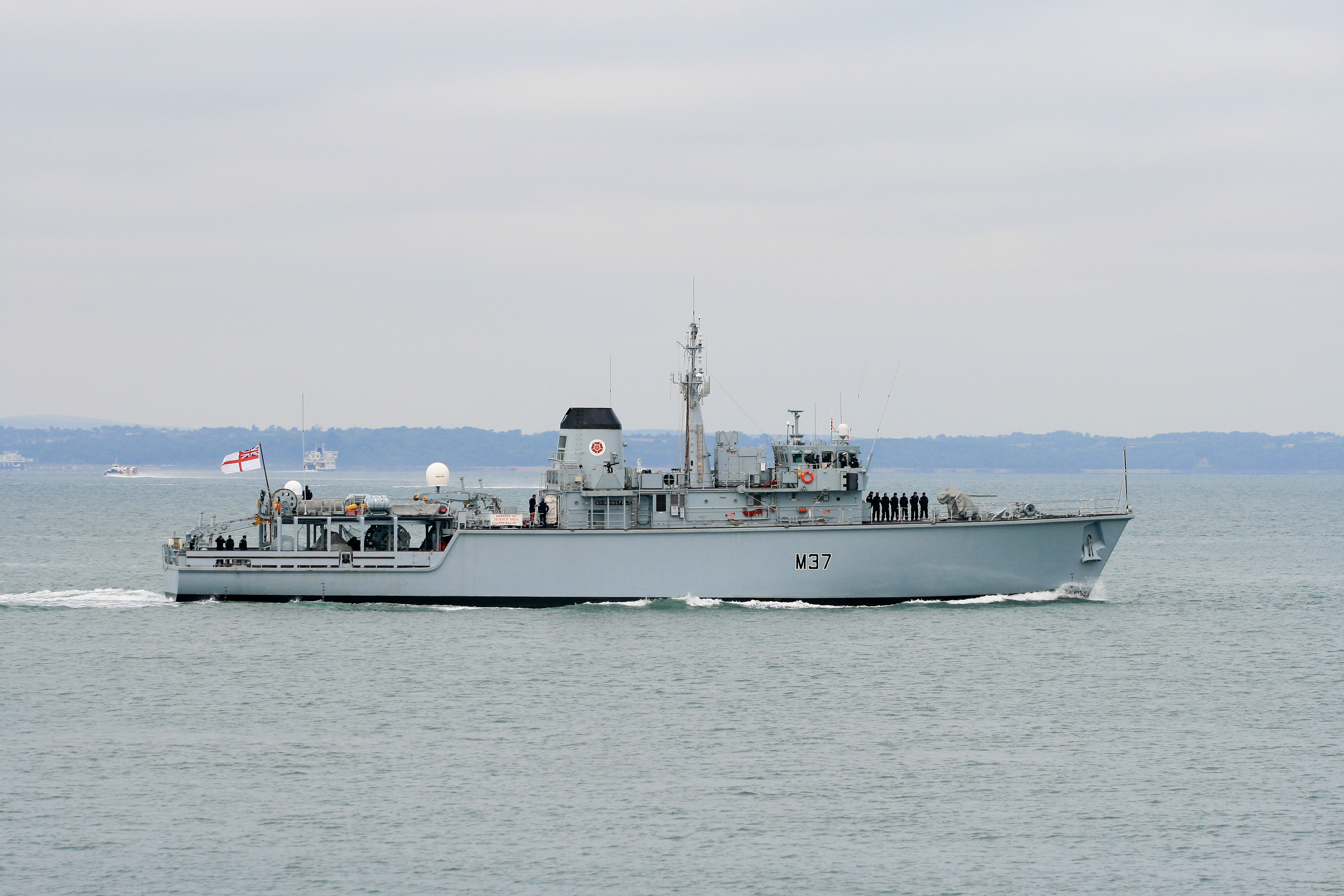
- HMS Chiddingfold entering Portsmouth July 2013.

History

United Kingdom
- Name: Chiddingfold
- Operator: Royal Navy
- Builder: Vosper Thornycroft
- Launched: October 1983
- Sponsored by: Lady Anne Kennon
- Commissioned: October 1984
- Out of service: 2026
- Home port: HMNB Portsmouth, Hampshire
- Identification: MMSI number: 234582000; Callsign: GBPD; Pennant number: M37
- Motto: "Leading the Hunt"
- Nickname(s): "Cheery Chid"
- Status: Out of service

General characteristics
- Class & type: Hunt-class mine countermeasures vessel
- Displacement: 750 t (740 long tons)
- Length: 60 m (196 ft 10 in)
- Beam: 9.8 m (32 ft 2 in)
- Draught: 2.2 m (7 ft 3 in)
- Propulsion: 2 × Caterpillar C32 diesels, 2 shafts
- Speed: 17 kn (31 km/h; 20 mph)
- Complement: 45 (6 officers & 39 ratings)
- Sensors & processing systems: Sonar Type 2193
- Electronic warfare & decoys: SeaFox mine disposal system; Diver-placed explosive charges
- Armament: 1 × DS30B 30mm rapid-fire gun; 2 × miniguns (may be replaced by Browning .50 caliber heavy machine guns as of 2023); 3 × general purpose machine guns

HMS Chiddingfold was a Hunt-class mine countermeasures vessel of Britain's Royal Navy. She was launched in October 1983 by her sponsor, Lady Anne Kennon, and formally entered the service of the Royal Navy in October 1984. Chiddingfold was a minehunter, and her purpose is to find and destroy mines, not only in a time of war but also in peacetime. There are about a quarter of a million mines still active from the Second World War alone and they pose a major threat to both military and civilian ships. Chiddingfold was able to enter some types of minefields without magnetic mines detonating because she is made of glass-reinforced plastic, and all fixtures within the ship are made of non-ferrous metals, keeping the ship's magnetic signature to the bare minimum. She was formally withdrawn from service in 2026.

== Operational history ==
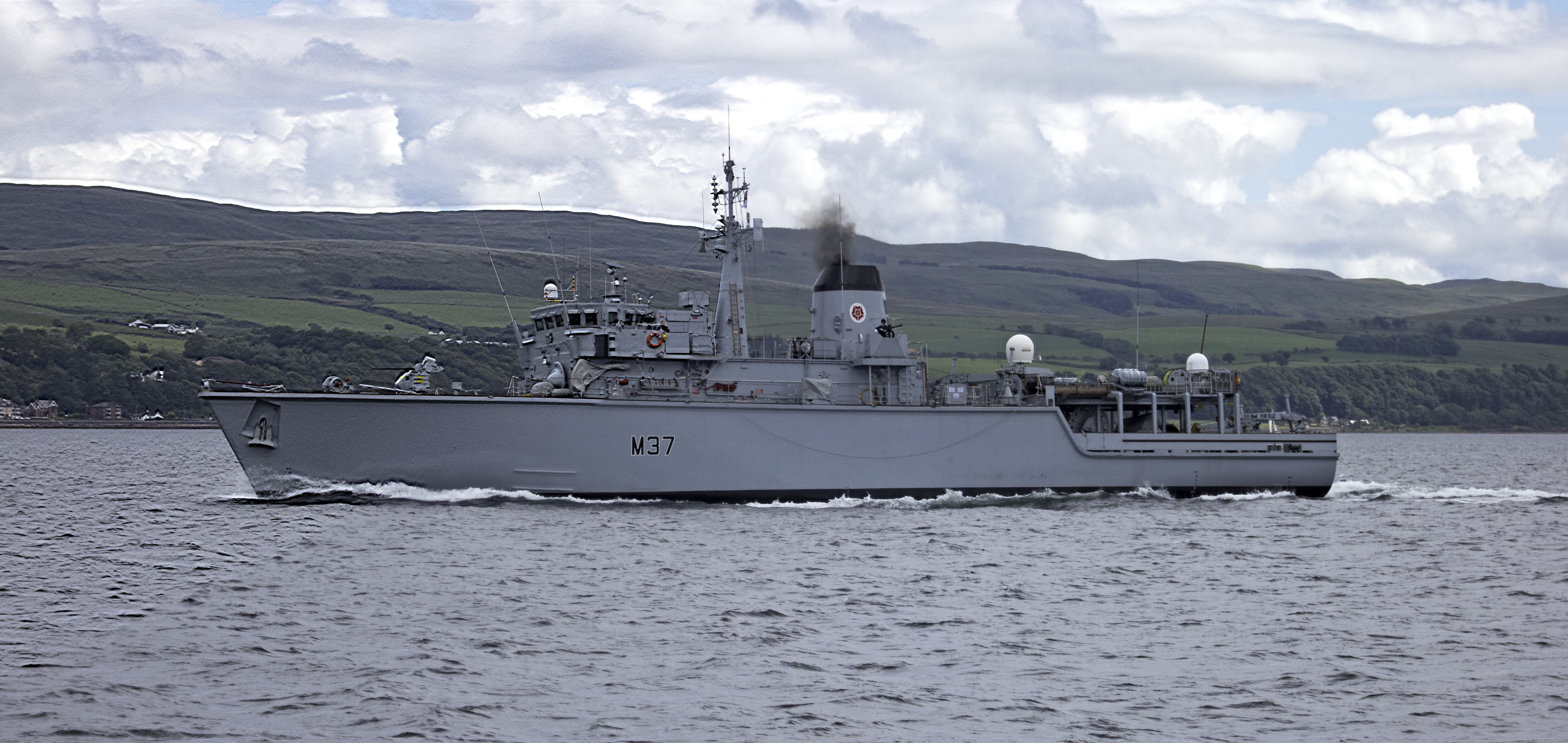
HMS Chiddingfold on the Clyde in 2013

In January 2012, Chiddingfold began a year-long mid-life upgrade project, including the replacement of her engines, gearboxes, propellers and an upgraded thruster system; she was the first vessel of her class to undergo the refurbishment.

In June 2014, Chiddingfold sailed in company with HMS Penzance for a three-year deployment in the Persian Gulf. She returned to the UK in 2017 after being relieved by sister HMS Ledbury.

The long-term deployment to the Persian Gulf was renewed again in mid-2020 when Chiddingfold returned to the region, again in company with Penzance, to operate as part of 9 Mine Countermeasures Squadron from HMS Jufair in Bahrain. In this role, crews for Chiddingfold rotate every four months.

On 19 January 2024, the ship was involved in an incident in Bahrain where it collided with HMS Bangor. It had previously been involved in a similar collision with HMS Penzance in 2021, also off the coast of Bahrain. HMS Chiddingfold was reported back in service in May 2024. In early 2025, the ship was returned to the U.K. on a heavy-lift vessel. She required docking and recertification given that her last refit was completed in February 2019. As of late 2025 it was reported that she was in "extended readiness" (uncrewed reserve) and used as a source for spare parts for other Hunt-class vessels.

She was officially retired in July 2026.

== Affiliations ==
Chiddingfold has a connection with the village of Chiddingfold, and every year they have a stall at the Chiddingfold fete. HMS Chiddingfold is also affiliated with the Worshipful Company of Pattenmakers, one of the City of London's Livery Companies and T.S. Lochinvar, a unit of the Sea & Royal Marine Cadets based in South Queensferry, Scotland.
