= Seafox drone =

Remotely operated anti-mine marine drone

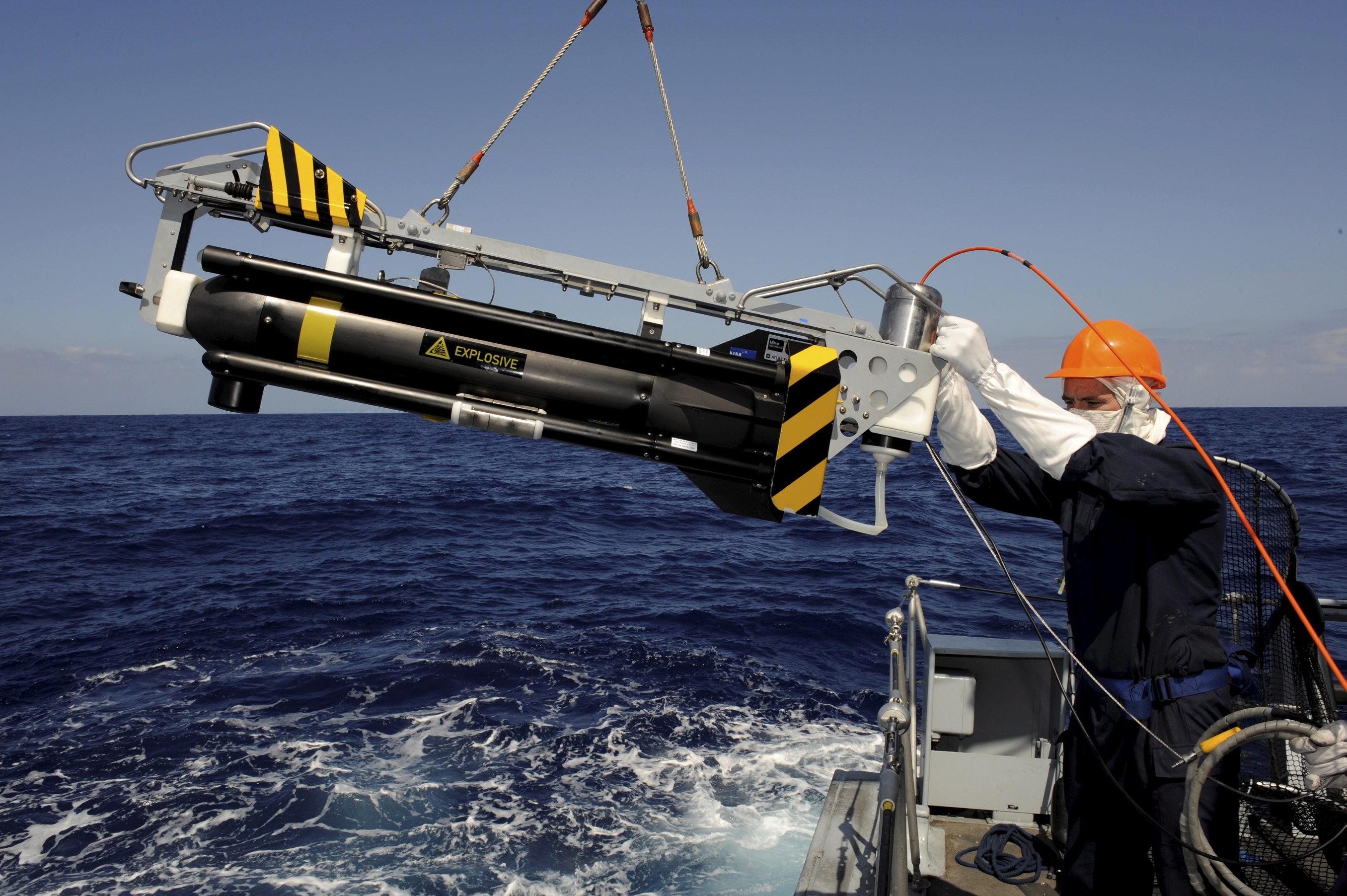
- HMS Bangor deploys SeaFox-C off Libya in 2011

Class overview
- Name: SeaFox
- Builders: Atlas Elektronik
- Operators: United States United Kingdom Estonia Finland Germany Netherlands Sweden Belgium Ukraine Romania

General characteristics
- Type: Unmanned Undersea Vehicle
- Length: 1.2 m (3 ft 11 in)
- Propulsion: Four independent motors plus hover thruster
- Speed: Max. 4kn
- Range: 1 km (0.62 mi)
- Endurance: ~ 800m

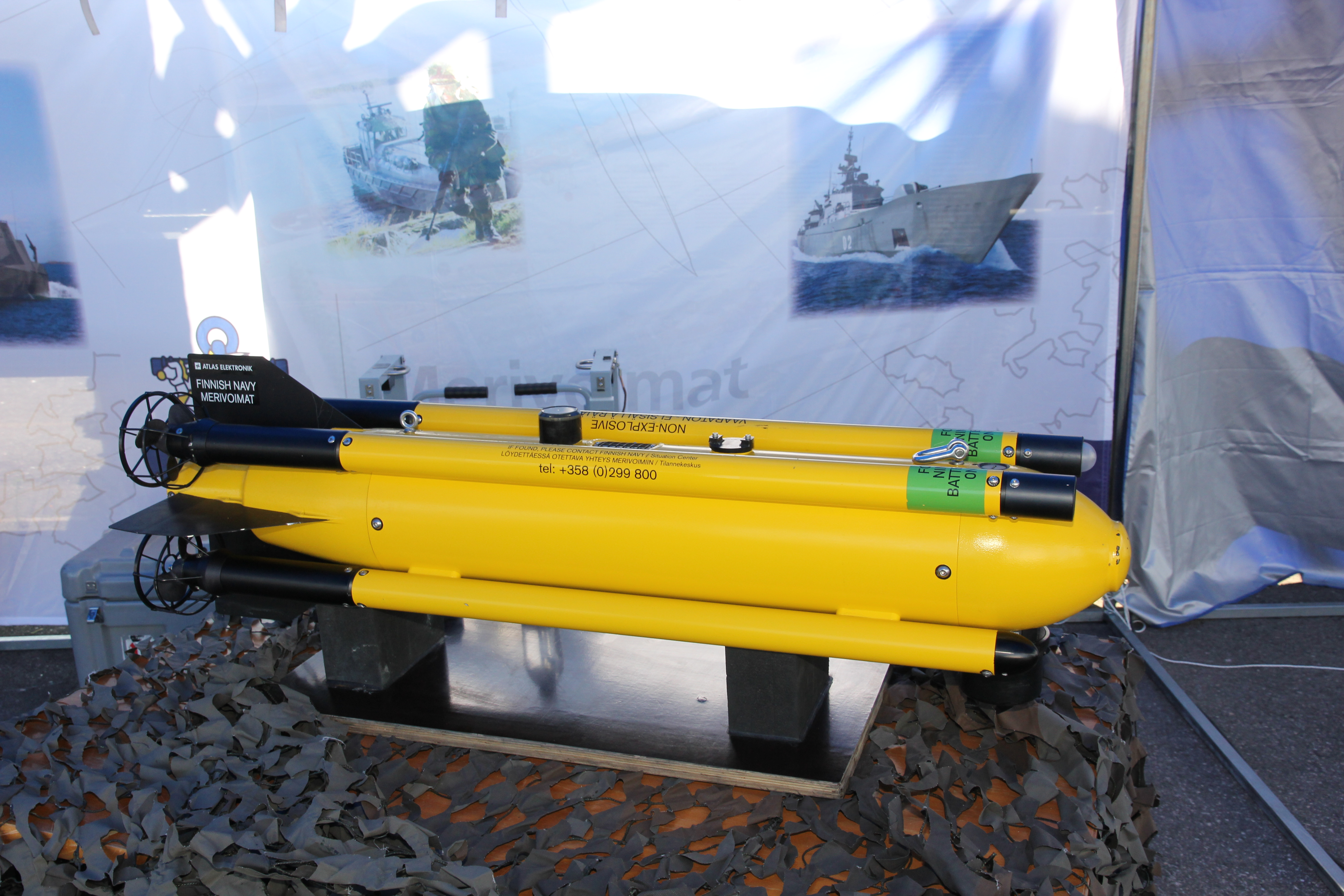
SeaFox-I of the Finnish Navy

The SeaFox is an anti-mine Unmanned underwater vehicle (UUV) manufactured by German company Atlas Elektronik. It is designed to locate and destroy ground and moored mines. There are three versions, including a training version. The orange SeaFox-I "inspection" variant has sonar and an Inertial navigation system, and the black SeaFox-C "combat" round also has a 1.4 kilograms (3.1 lb) shaped charge warhead. The system is in service with eleven navies.

The SeaFox is an advanced design of an Expendable Mine Disposal Vehicle or EMDV. It has a low life cycle cost as it has low running and replacement costs. Its main targets are sea mines that pose a danger to vessels. It communicates with the ship via a fiber-optic cable. The SeaFox uses a custom launch and retrieval system, that may be fitted to a variety of ships, boats or even helicopters. It can be used for a range of tasks such as conduct damage estimation, route surveys, maritime boundary control, intelligence and harbor surveillance missions.

== Service history ==
In 2001 the Royal Navy leased some SeaFox drones for use on HMS Bangor and HMS Blyth off Iraq as part of Operation Telic. The Bangor also deployed them off Libya in 2011. In October 2015 the Naval Surface Weapons Center (NSWC) commissioned the Atlas North America to get more SeaFox vehicles.

== Technical specifications ==
The operational depth for the SeaFox C is between 0 meters and 300 meters. The SeaFox has a range of 1200 meters depending on acoustic and current conditions. The propulsion system on the SeaFox includes four horizontal propellers and one vertical thruster. The entire propulsion system is battery powered. The maximum speed of the SeaFox is 6 knots. The SeaFox can be controlled with a remote or can be set on automatic and it will use radar and sonar to locate mines and other obstacles that it is tasked with clearing. The SeaFox has live CCTV feed and a high intensity searchlight. The data feed is via a fiber-optic cable that is about 3000 meters long. The SeaFox is launched and retrieved using a crane. The warhead of the SeaFox is a fully shaped charge with demonstrated effectiveness against incendiary devices.
