= HMS Bangor (M109) =

2000 Sandown-class minehunter of the Royal Navy

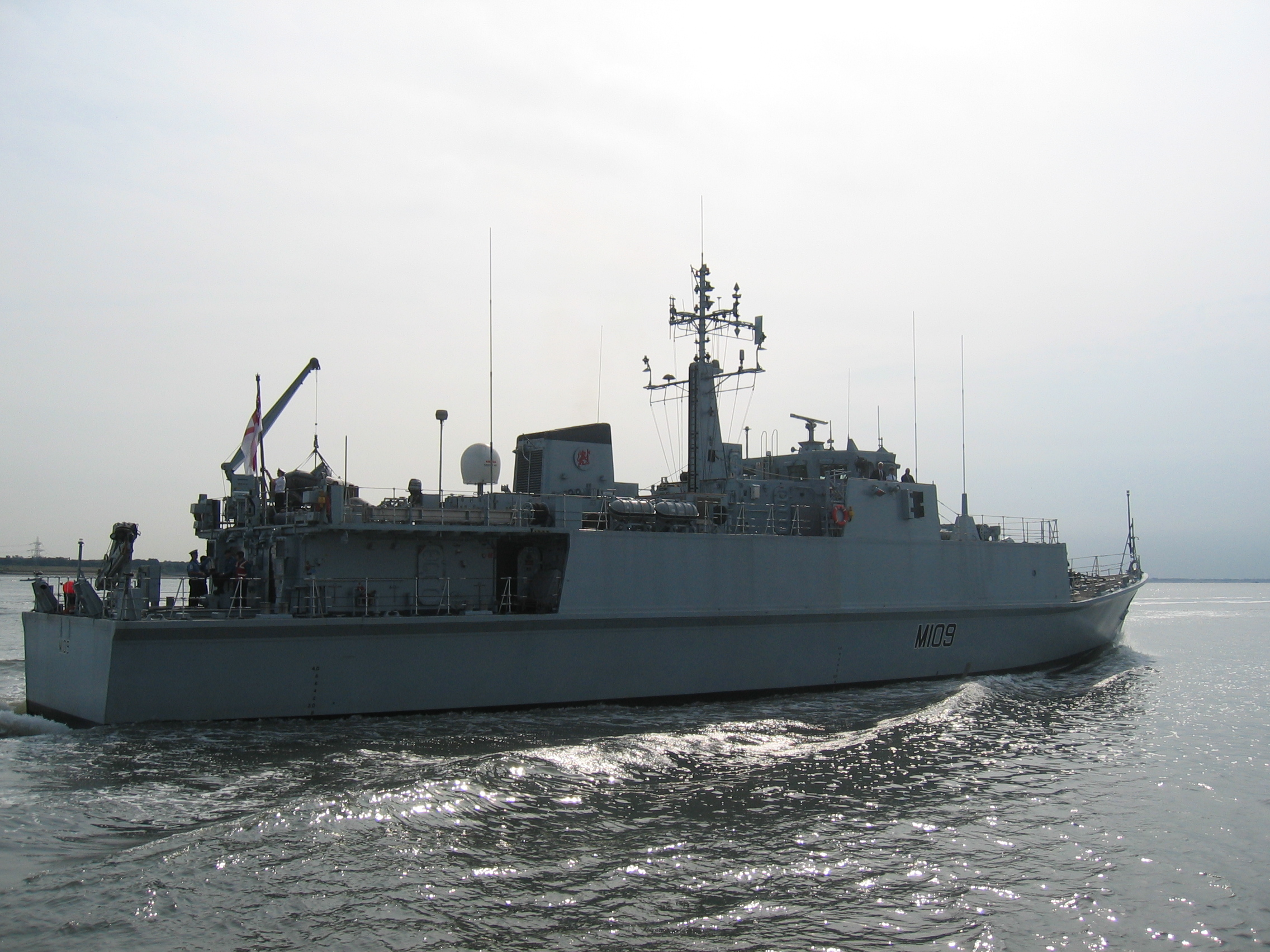
- HMS Bangor sweeping Southampton Water in preparation for the International Fleet Review 2005.

History

United Kingdom
- Name: Bangor
- Namesake: Bangor, County Down
- Operator: Royal Navy
- Builder: Vosper Thornycroft
- Launched: 16 April 1999
- Commissioned: 26 July 2000
- Home port: HMNB Clyde
- Identification: Pennant number: M109; IMO number: 4906783; MMSI number: 234567000
- Status: in active service

General characteristics
- Class & type: Sandown-class minehunter
- Displacement: 600 t (590 long tons; 660 short tons)
- Length: 52.5 m (172 ft 3 in)
- Beam: 10.9 m (35 ft 9 in)
- Draught: 2.3 m (7 ft 7 in)
- Propulsion: Paxman Valenta 6RP200E diesels 1,523 shp (1,136 kW), diesel-electric drive, Voith Schneider Propellers, Schottel bow thrusters
- Speed: 13 knots (24 km/h; 15 mph)
- Complement: 34 (accommodation for up to 40)
- Sensors & processing systems: Radar Type 1007 I-Band; Sonar Type 2093
- Electronic warfare & decoys: SeaFox mine disposal system; Diver-placed explosive charges
- Armament: 1 × DS30B 30mm rapid-fire gun; 2 × miniguns (may be replaced by Browning .50-caliber heavy machine guns as of 2023); 3 × General purpose machine guns

HMS Bangor is a Sandown-class minehunter commissioned by the Royal Navy in 2000, which was designed to hunt naval mines in depths of up to 200 m (660 ft) using the Sonar 2093 Variable Depth Sonar (VDS). This means that she can conduct mine clearance operations throughout the continental shelf. She is named after the Northern Ireland seaside city of the same name, and the second Royal Navy vessel to bear the name. As of January 2024, she was the last vessel of her class in active Royal Navy service.

In 2025, HMS Bangor began an overhaul to extend its life for a further five years of service.

== History ==
Through October 2011 Bangor conducted maritime security patrols off Misrata during the NATO military intervention in Libya.

Bangor participated in the 2013 Exercise Joint Warrior. She was stationed on the River Clyde for the 2014 Commonwealth Games in Glasgow. For the duration of the games the general public were allowed on board for a free tour.

In mid-2021, Bangor deployed with HMS Middleton to join the vessels of 9 Mine Countermeasures Squadron operating out of HMS Jufair in Bahrain. Both vessels were upgraded with the Oceanographic Reconnaissance Combat Architecture (ORCA) system which assists vessels with a higher level of mine detection at greater stand-off distances. Bangor and Middleton were to relieve their sister vessels HMS Brocklesby and HMS Shoreham, which returned to the UK.

In January 2024, her fibreglass hull, designed to minimise risk from magnetic mines, was damaged in a collision with HMS Chiddingfold in Bahrain whilst the latter was attempting to moor. As of August 2024, she was dry-docked for repair having suffered some further damage in a subsequent collision with USS Gladiator. In was returned to Scotland to continue in service for a further five years being based out of HMNB Clyde. She was returned to HNNB Clyde on a heavy-lift vessel in preparation for structural repairs in late November 2025. The repairs were scheduled for completion in April 2026.

As of August 2026, Bangor was described as "back at sea".
