= Atlas Elektronik =

Marine defence and electronics company in Germany

ATLAS ELEKTRONIK GmbH
- Company type: Subsidiary
- Industry: Defence
- Founded: January 15, 1902; 124 years ago in Bremen
- Headquarters: Bremen-Sebaldsbrück, Germany
- Key people: Peter Feldhaus (chairman)
- Parent: TKMS

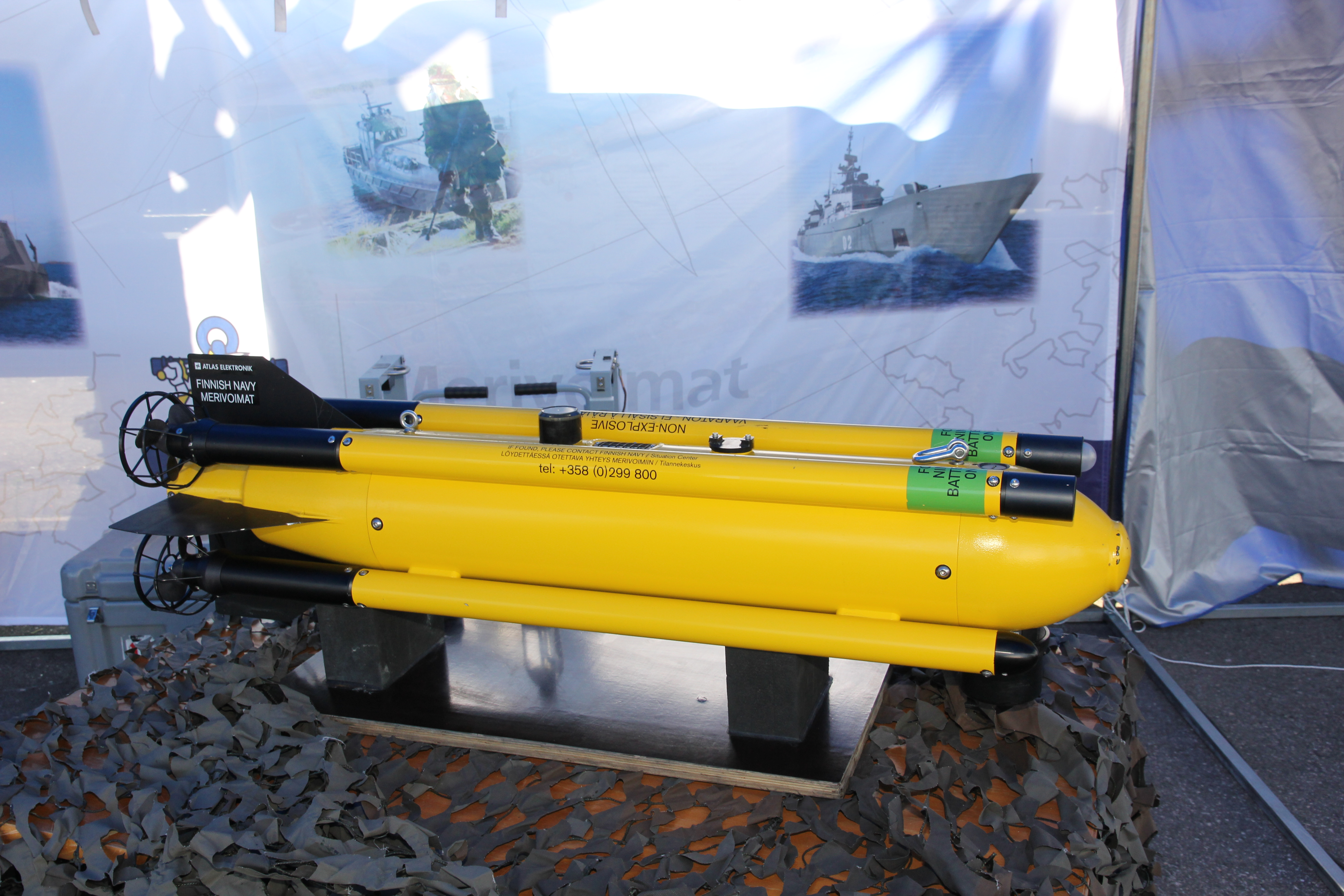
Seafox drone manufactured by Atlas Elektronik

Atlas Elektronik GmbH is a naval/marine electronics and systems business based in Bremen, Germany. It is involved in the development of integrated sonar systems for submarines and heavyweight torpedoes.

The company was a subsidiary of BAE Systems until December 2005, when it was sold to ThyssenKrupp and EADS.

Atlas Elektronik became a wholly owned subsidiary of TKMS (ThyssenKrupp Marine Systems) in 2017.

== History ==
=== Early history ===
The company was founded in 1902 as Norddeutsche Maschinen- und Armaturenfabrik GmbH, focusing on shipbuilding and naval engineering services. Its name was changed in 1911 to Atlas Werke AG, the origin of its modern-day name.

During the First World War, Atlas Werke built U-boats for the Imperial German Navy.

After the war, the company shrank in size and began to focus on civilian technology, due to restrictions imposed by the Treaty of Versailles.

Following the Nazi seizure of power, the company grew to become an arms supplier for the Kriegsmarine. Atlas manufactured torpedoes, minesweepers and Enigma machines, among other things.

=== After 1945 ===
After the end of the Second World War, Atlas was rebuilt. The shipbuilding division and other business areas were sold off, shifting the focus solely to marine and defence electronics.

Starting in the 1960s, the company switched ownership several times, including several years spent as subsidiary of Friedrich Krupp AG (after 1965) and Bremer Vulkan (1991). In 1992, Atlas merged with STN Systemtechnik Nord, a large defence electronics supplier, into STN Atlas Elektronik GmbH. Five years later, in 1997, STN Atlas was taken over by Rheinmetall (51%) and BAE Systems (49%).

In 2003 STN Altas was split; Rheinmetall acquired the land systems business (Rheinmetall Defence Electronics) and BAE took control of the naval business, keeping the name Atlas Elektronik.

=== Sale to ThyssenKrupp ===
Logo until 2017

BAE Systems announced it intended to sell the company in 2005. The main bidders were ThyssenKrupp/EADS, Thales Group and L-3 Communications. On December 30 the joint ThyssenKrupp/EADS bid, valued at €145 million (£100m), was named the winner with the companies holding 51% and 49% respectively.

The bid was complicated by the requirement of the German government to approve any sale as acceptable. The Financial Times described the sale as "cut price" because the French company Thales bid €300 million, but was blocked from purchasing Atlas on national security grounds.

Airbus Defence and Space announcement sale its remaining shares in Atlas Elektronik to ThyssenKrupp on 12 January 2017. The merge of ThyssenKrupp Marine Systems and Atlas Elektronik was completed on 3 April 2017.

== Products ==
- Submarine systems
- Surface combatant systems
- Mine warfare systems, e.g. SeaFox ROV for mine disposal
- Anti-submarine warfare systems
- Maritime security systems
- Unmanned vehicles
- Naval weapons, e.g. Atlas Elektronik SUT and DM2A4 (SeaHake mod 4) heavyweight torpedoes
- Marine communication systems
- Customer services

== Subsidiaries ==
- Hagenuk Marinekommunikation (Germany)
- Atlas Elektronik India
- Atlas Elektronik Finland
- Atlas Elektronik Canada
- Atlas Elektronik UK
- Atlas Maridan (Denmark)
- Atlas North America
- Anec Korea (South Korea)
- Sonartech Atlas (Australia)
- Atlas UAE

The group also includes the associated subsidiaries Cybicom Atlas Defence (South Africa) and Advanced Lithium Systems (Greece)
