= HMS Shoreham (M112) =

Sandown-class minehunter of the Royal Navy

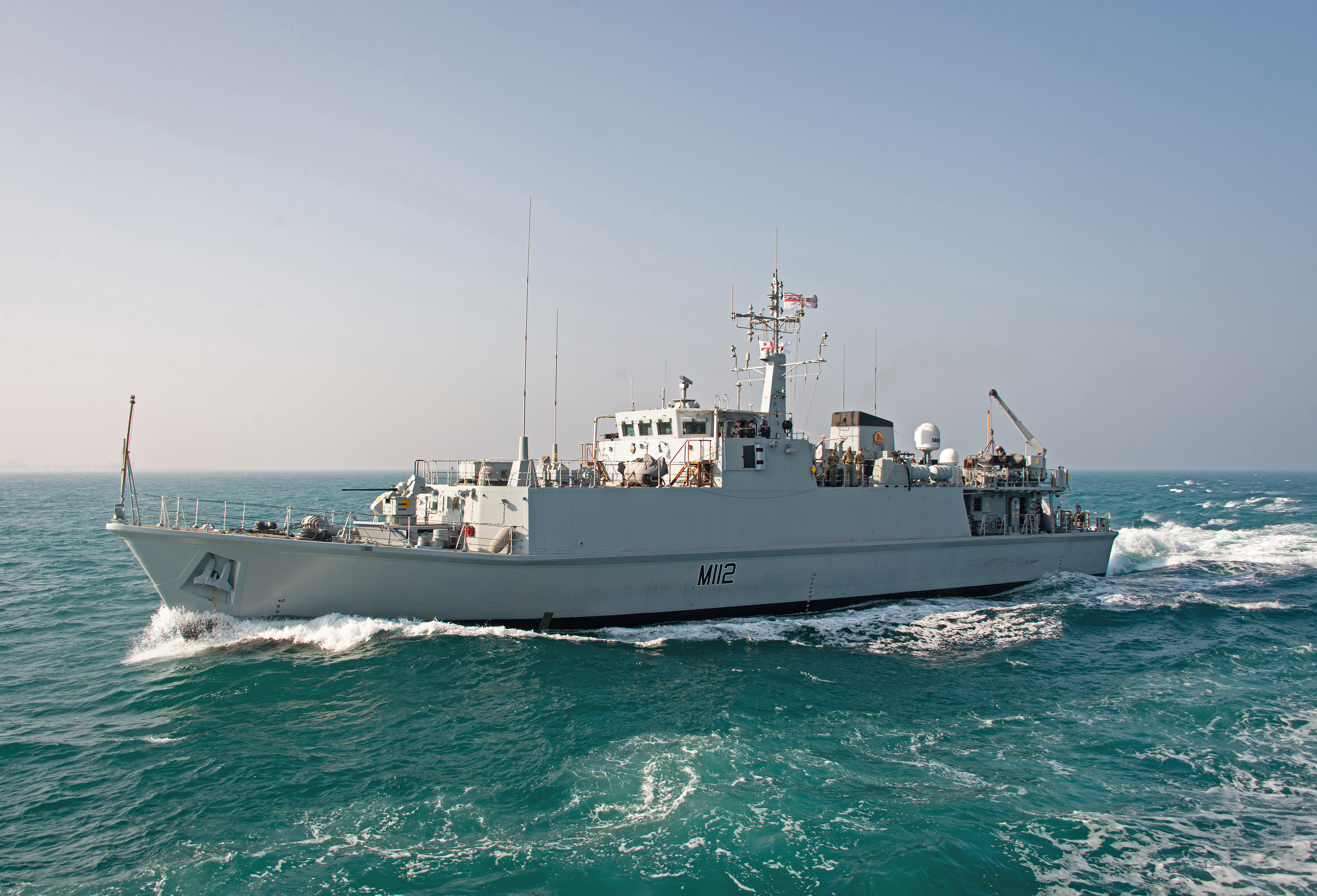
- Shoreham off Bahrain in 2021

History

United Kingdom
- Name: HMS Shoreham
- Builder: Vosper Thornycroft
- Launched: 9 April 2001
- Commissioned: 20 July 2002
- Decommissioned: October 2022
- Home port: HMNB Clyde
- Identification: IMO number: 4906812; MMSI number: 232002833; Callsign: GCVO; Pennant number: M112
- Status: Decommissioned, transferred to Ukraine as Cherkasy
- Badge

General characteristics
- Class & type: Sandown-class minehunter
- Displacement: 600 t (590 long tons)
- Length: 52.5 m (172 ft 3 in)
- Beam: 10.9 m (35 ft 9 in)
- Draught: 2.3 m (7 ft 7 in)
- Propulsion: Diesel-electric drive; Paxman Valenta 6RP200E diesels; 1,136 kW (1,523 shp); Voith Schneider Propellers, Schottel bow thrusters
- Speed: 13 kn (24 km/h; 15 mph)
- Complement: 34 (accommodation for up to 40)
- Sensors & processing systems: Radar Type 1007 I-Band; Sonar Type 2093
- Electronic warfare & decoys: SeaFox mine disposal system; Diver-placed explosive charges
- Armament: 1 × 30 mm DS30M Mk2 gun; 2 × miniguns; 3 × general purpose machine guns

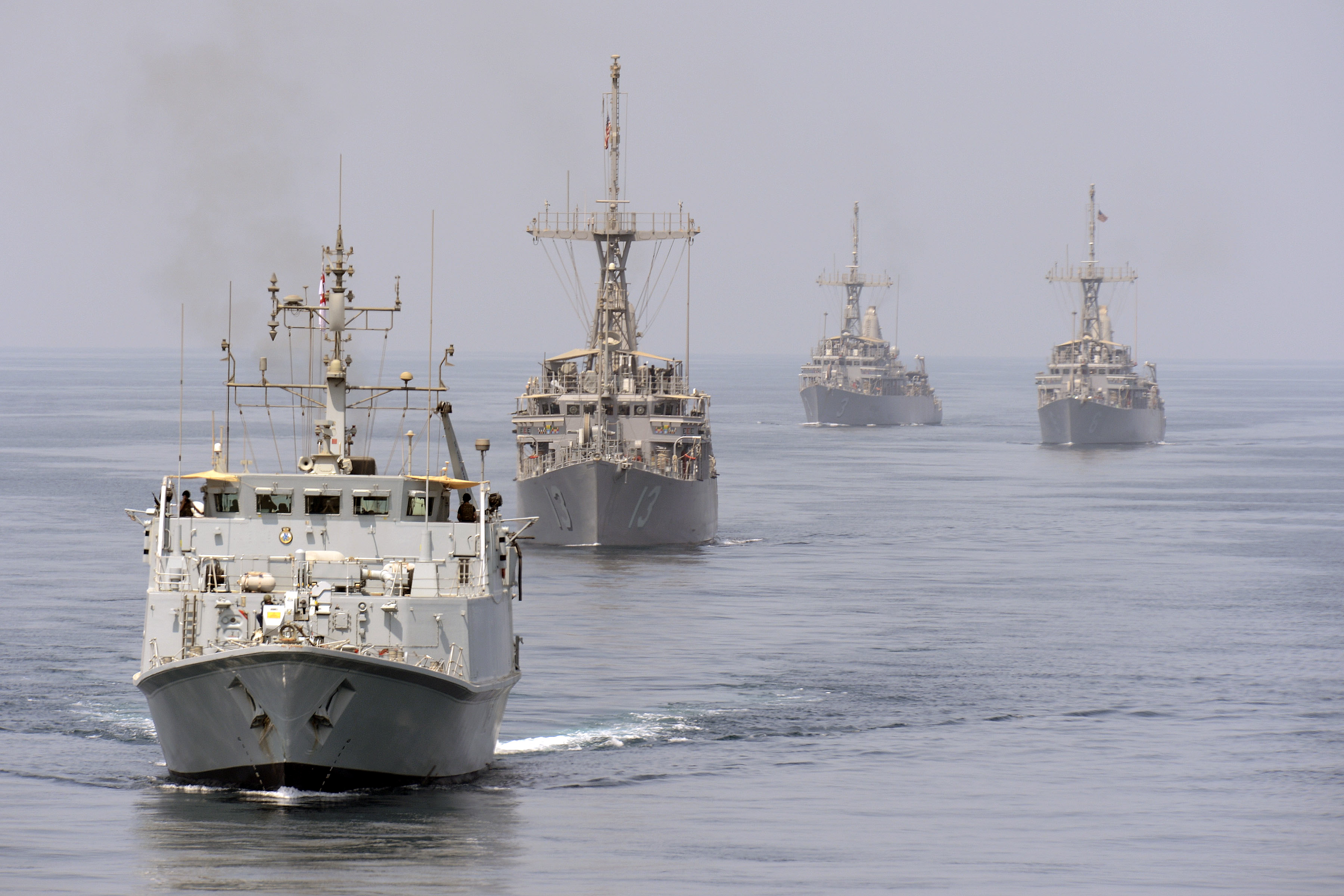
HMS Shoreham leads a MCM convoy in the Persian Gulf, 2012

HMS Shoreham is a Sandown-class minehunter, formerly of the British Royal Navy. She was the fifth vessel to bear the name. From 2018 to 2021, Shoreham was deployed at UKNSF Bahrain together with three other mine countermeasures ships as part of 9 Mine Countermeasures Squadron on Operation Kipion.

In 2022 she was decommissioned from the Royal Navy and transferred to Ukraine, where she in 2023 was commissioned into the Ukrainian Navy as Cherkasy (Ukrainian: Черкаси), with pennant number M311.

== Operational history ==
=== Royal Navy (UK) ===
==== 2001–2010 ====
Shoreham was accepted into service on 28 November 2001 and commissioned in a ceremony in her namesake port on 20 July 2002.

==== 2011–2022 ====
In 2012, Shoreham deployed to the Persian Gulf to join the 9th Mine Countermeasures squadron based in Bahrain. She returned to Faslane on 28 August 2015 after three years away.

Shoreham entered refit in Rosyth in 2016 for repair work to her hull. Other work carried out included installing a new galley, fitting a new fire detection system and improving the high-pressure air system. She was handed back to the Royal Navy in January 2017.

In spring 2017, Shoreham deployed with NATO Mine Countermeasures Group 1 (SNMCMG1), operating around Northern Europe. During the course of this deployment Shoreham, the last of the Sandown class to be built, took part in naval exercises with the former HMS Sandown, now operated by the Estonian Navy as Admiral Cowan.

From 2018 to 2021, Shoreham served with 9 Mine Countermeasures Squadron operating from HMS Jufair in the Persian Gulf. In August 2021, Shoreham returned to the U.K having been relieved by her sister ship HMS Bangor.

In May 2022, Shoreham embarked on a final short tour of the UK ahead of her planned decommissioning including a final visit to her namesake port during which 1,500 members of the public toured the ship.

In September 2022, she was spotted operating around Firth of Forth carrying the name "Черкаси" (Ukrainian: Cherkasy) and the pennant number M311. Though still reportedly in commission with the Royal Navy, she was now training sailors of the Ukrainian Navy prior to her planned handover to that Navy. In October 2022 it was reported that she had been decommissioned.

=== Ukrainian Navy ===
On 2 July 2023, the ship was commissioned into the Ukrainian Navy's Minesweeper Division as "Черкаси" (Ukrainian: Cherkasy), in honour of the minesweeper "Черкаси" that was lost during the Russian annexation of Crimea in 2014. The ceremony was held in Glasgow. In April 2024, it was indicated that Cherkasy and her sister ship Chernihiv were to be based at HMNB Portsmouth for the "foreseeable future as they prepare for exercises with the Royal Navy alongside the US Navy in UK waters, which will help Ukraine understand how to operate with NATO navies".
