= HMS Ramsey (M110) =

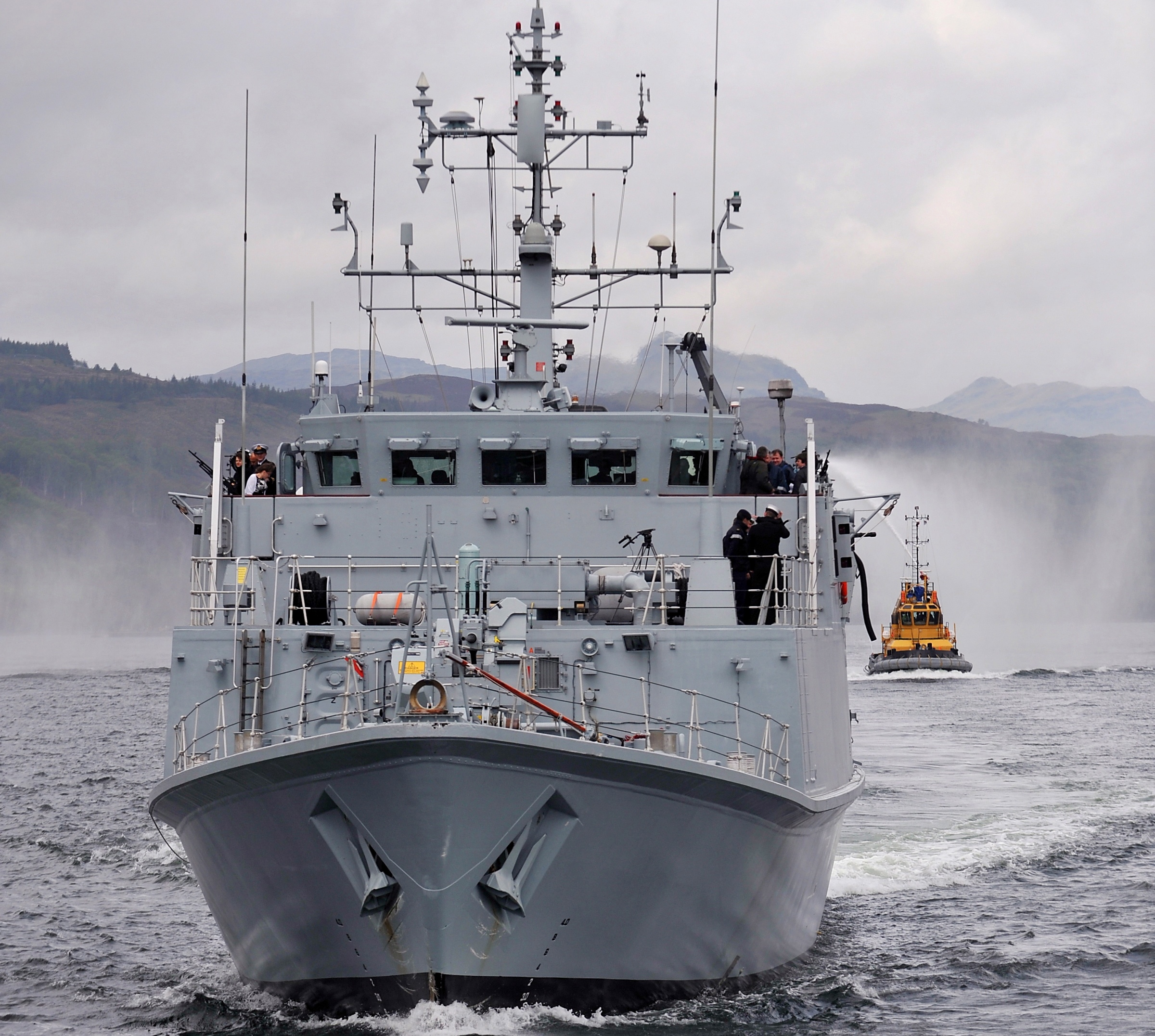
- HMS Ramsey, 2011

History

United Kingdom
- Name: HMS Ramsey
- Operator: Royal Navy
- Builder: Vosper Thornycroft
- Launched: 25 November 1999
- Sponsored by: Lady Alynne Dunt, wife of Vice Admiral Sir John Dunt
- Commissioned: September 2000
- Decommissioned: 4 August 2021
- Home port: HMNB Clyde, Faslane
- Identification: MMSI number: 367000190; Pennant number: M110
- Status: Decommissioned
- Badge

General characteristics
- Class & type: Sandown-class minehunter
- Displacement: 600 t (590 long tons)
- Length: 52.5 m (172 ft 3 in)
- Beam: 10.9 m (35 ft 9 in)
- Draught: 2.3 m (7 ft 7 in)
- Propulsion: Paxman Valenta 6RP200E diesels 1,523 shp (1,136 kW); Diesel-electric drive; Voith Schneider Propellers; Schottel bow thrusters
- Speed: 13 knots (24 km/h; 15 mph)
- Complement: 34 (accommodation for up to 40)
- Sensors & processing systems: Radar Type 1007 I-Band; Sonar Type 2093
- Electronic warfare & decoys: SeaFox mine disposal system; Diver-placed explosive charges
- Armament: 1 × 30 mm DS30M Mk2 gun; 2 × Miniguns; 3 × General purpose machine guns

HMS Ramsey was a Sandown-class minehunter of the British Royal Navy. Like other vessels of the Sandown class, Ramsey was built of glass-reinforced plastic and other non-magnetic materials so that her hull does not trigger naval mines as easily as standard warships.

She was the third vessel of the Royal Navy named after the eponymous town on the Isle of Man.

On 11 March 2009, Ramsey and her sister ship Blyth returned from a 2 1/2-year deployment in the Middle East to their home port at HMNB Clyde. During this time the crews of those ships were rotated on and off with eight different crews based in the UK. She set sail for another deployment in the Middle East on 11 March 2011.

In 2020, Blyth participated in the annual NATO BALTOPS exercise, remaining later in the Baltic with a NATO minewarfare group.

Ramsey and Blyth were decommissioned in joint ceremony at Rosyth on 4 August 2021. The Royal Navy announced in 2021 that following a refit by Babcock she will be transferred to the Ukrainian Navy, but later reports suggest she will go to the Romanian Navy. She was sold for scrap soon after.
