= HMS Penzance (M106) =

1998 Sandown-class minehunter of the Royal Navy

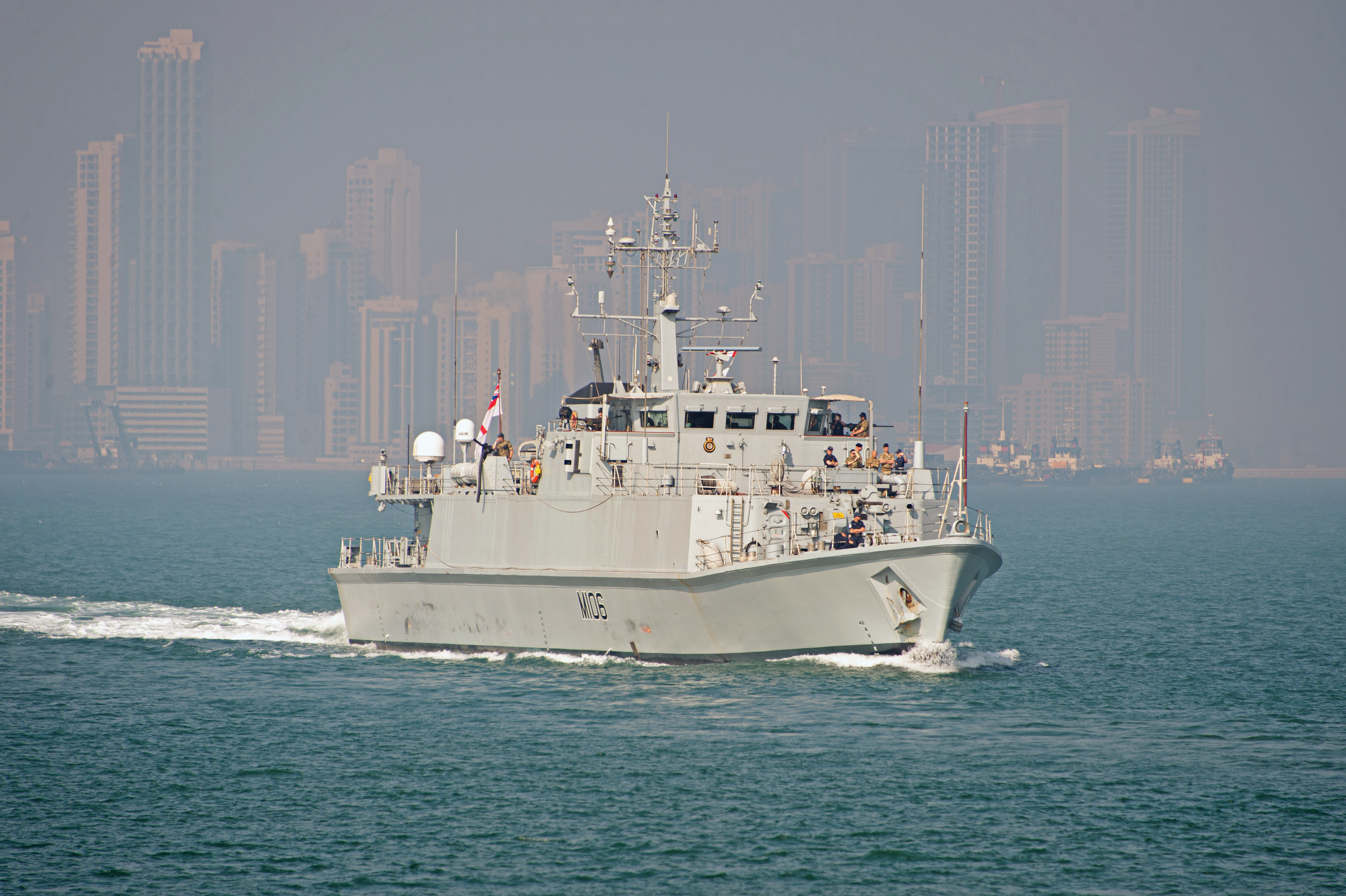
- HMS Penzance off Bahrain, 2021

History

United Kingdom
- Name: Penzance
- Builder: Vosper Thornycroft
- Launched: 11 March 1997
- Commissioned: 14 May 1998
- Home port: HMNB Clyde
- Identification: MMSI number: 234626000; Callsign: GCUI; Pennant number: M106
- Motto: Diligenter Pensa; "Diligent thought"
- Status: Decommissioned

General characteristics
- Class & type: Sandown-class minehunter
- Displacement: 600 t (590 long tons)
- Length: 52.5 m (172 ft 3 in)
- Beam: 10.9 m (35 ft 9 in)
- Draught: 2.3 m (7 ft 7 in)
- Propulsion: Paxman Valenta 6RP200E diesel engine 1,523 shp (1,136 kW), diesel-electric drive, Voith Schneider Propellers, Schottel bow thrusters
- Speed: 13 knots (24 km/h; 15 mph)
- Complement: 34 (accommodation for up to 40)
- Sensors & processing systems: Radar Type 1007 I-band; Sonar Type 2093
- Electronic warfare & decoys: SeaFox mine disposal system; Diver-placed explosive charges
- Armament: 1 × 30mm DS30B S30GM1; 2 × Miniguns (may have been replaced by Browning .50 caliber heavy machine guns as of 2023); 3 × General purpose machine guns

HMS Penzance was a Sandown-class minehunter commissioned by the Royal Navy in 1998. She was named after the seaside town of Penzance in Cornwall, and was the fourth vessel to bear the name. She was decommissioned in January 2024.

== Construction and career ==
In 2000, Penzance was awarded the freedom of the town of Penzance.

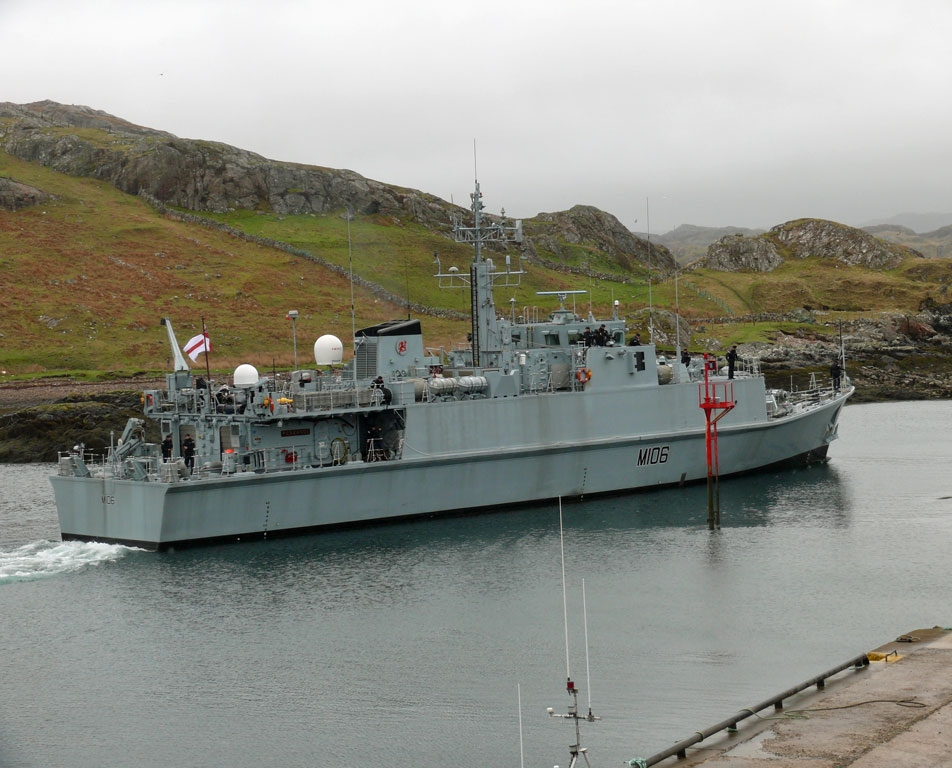
HMS Penzance near Kinlochbervie, 2009

In 2020 Penzance deployed long-term to the Persian Gulf, operating as part of 9 Mine Countermeasures Squadron from HMS Jufair in Bahrain. In this role, crews for Penzance rotate every four months.

In April 2021 Penzance was involved in a collision with HMS Chiddingfold in Mina Salman, Bahrain. Both vessels remained afloat and were able to berth safely. Penzance returned to U.K. waters from the Persian Gulf in mid-2022.

On 17 April 2023, in Scottish waters Penzance nearly collided with 12,000 tonne Norwegian tanker Sten Baltic, which slowed down to avoid collision. None of Penzance's bridge officers had noticed the tanker until radioed to speed up to avoid a collision. The senior bridge officer, who tried to cover up his actions, was court-martialed losing his seniority and fined.

In November 2023, Penzance deployed with the mine countermeasures vessel HMS Cattistock and other Royal Navy warships to patrol northern European waters with vulnerable undersea critical infrastructure in order to assist in protecting such assets. It was reported that this deployment might be the minehunter's last since she was expected to decommission before 2025. In January 2024, Penzance sailed into Rosyth for the final time, flying her paying off pennant.
