= Charles Sheridan Swan =

Charles Sheridan Swan (27 January 1831 – 26 April 1879) was an English engineer and shipbuilder who cofounded Swan Hunter.

Swan was born in Longbenton, Northumberland (now North Tyneside). In 1851, he was working in the coal industry as an engineer. In 1874, he took over the management of a shipyard established in 1842 by a John Coutts and by then owned by a Dr Charles Mitchell who was married to one of his (Swan's) sisters. He only managed the yard for five years as in 1879 he was killed returning from the Continent on a paddle steamer.

His widow continued the business after Swan's death in partnership with George Hunter.
