= Largs Bay =

Largs Bay may mean:

- Largs, Scotland, and its associated bay, Largs Bay
- Largs Bay, South Australia, a suburb, beach and jetty
- RFA Largs Bay (L3006), a ship
