= RFA Lyme Bay =

2007 Bay-class dock landing ship of the Royal Fleet Auxiliary

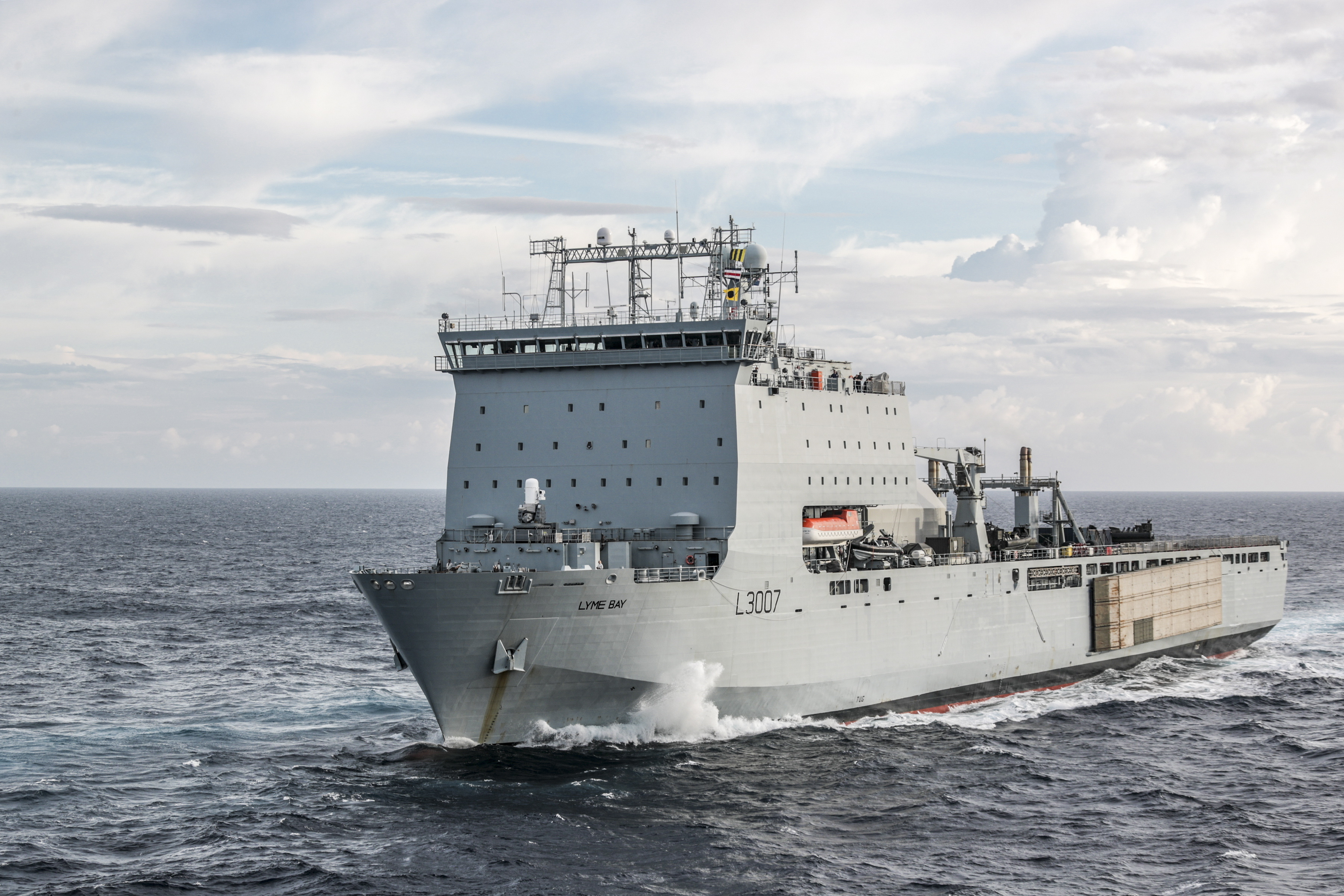
- RFA Lyme Bay in the Mediterranean, 2020

History

United Kingdom
- Name: RFA Lyme Bay
- Namesake: Lyme Bay, Dorset
- Ordered: 18 December 2000
- Builder: Swan Hunter / BAE Systems
- Laid down: 22 November 2002
- Launched: 3 September 2005
- In service: 26 November 2007
- Home port: Falmouth
- Identification: Pennant number: L3007; IMO number: 9240768; Deck code: YB
- Status: In active service
- Badge

General characteristics
- Class & type: Bay-class landing ship dock
- Displacement: 16,160 t (15,905 long tons) full load
- Length: 579.4 ft (176.6 m)
- Beam: 86.6 ft (26.4 m)
- Draught: 19 ft (5.8 m)
- Propulsion: 2 × Wärtsilä 8L26 generators, 6,000 hp (4.5 MW); 2 × Wärtsilä 12V26 generators, 9,000 hp (6.7 MW); 2 × azimuth thrusters; 1 × bow thruster
- Speed: 18 knots (33 km/h; 21 mph)
- Range: 8,000 nmi (15,000 km; 9,200 mi) at 15 kn (28 km/h; 17 mph)
- Boats & landing craft carried: 1 LCU or 2 LCVP in well deck; Mexeflote powered rafts
- Capacity: 1,150 linear metres of vehicles (up to 24 Challenger 2 tanks or 150 light trucks); Cargo capacity of 200 tons ammunition or 24 TEU containers
- Troops: 356 standard, 700 overload
- Complement: 60
- Armament: 2 × DS30B Mk 1 30 mm guns; 2 × Phalanx CIWS; 4 × 7.62mm Mk.44 Miniguns (may be replaced by Browning .50 caliber heavy machine guns as of 2023); 6 × 7.62mm L7 GPMGs
- Aircraft carried: Not routinely carried but a temporary hangar can be fitted.
- Aviation facilities: Flight deck can operate helicopters up to Chinook size

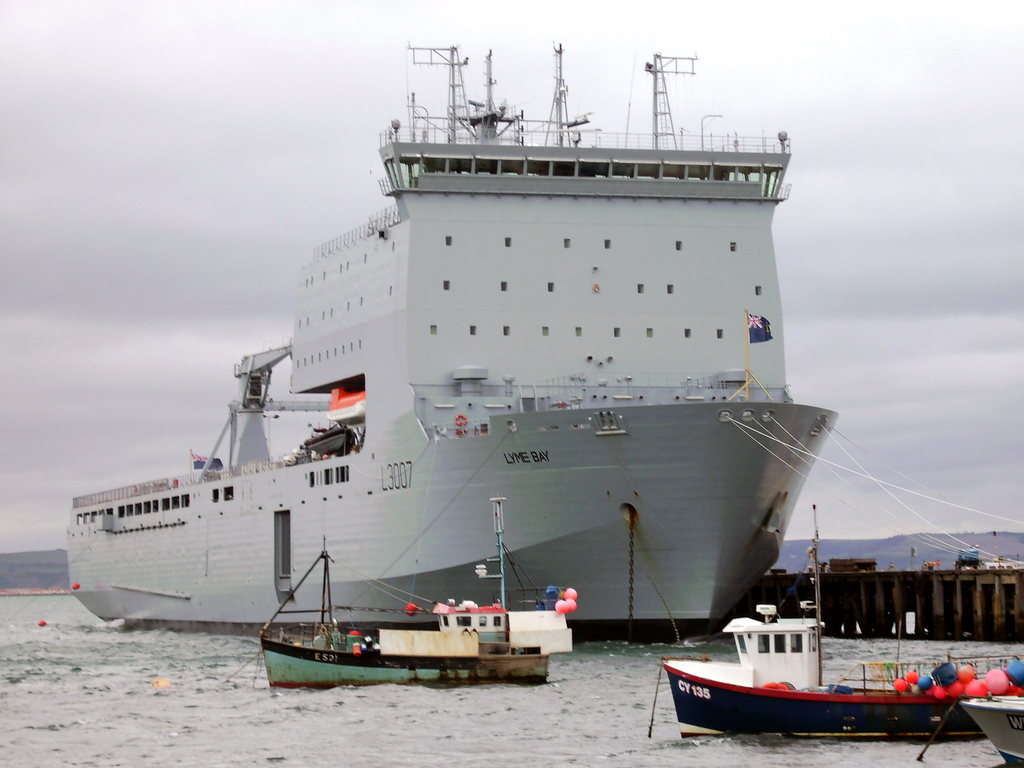
RFA Lyme Bay at Portland, August 2007

RFA Lyme Bay is a Bay-class auxiliary dock landing ship (LSD(A)) of the British Royal Fleet Auxiliary (RFA). Ordered from Swan Hunter in 2000, the ship was launched in 2005. However, cost overruns and delays saw the shipbuilder removed from the project, and the incomplete ship was towed to Govan for finishing by BAE Systems Naval Ships. Lyme Bay entered service in late 2007; the last ship of the class to join the RFA.

== Design and construction ==
The Bay class was designed as a replacement for the Round Table-class logistics ships operated by the RFA. The new design was based on the Royal Schelde Enforcer design; a joint project between the Dutch and Spanish resulting in the Rotterdam-class and Galicia-class amphibious warfare ships. The main difference with the British ships is the lack of a helicopter hangar. The ships were originally designated "Auxiliary Landing Ship Logistics" or ALSL, but this was changed in 2002 to "Landing Ship Dock (Auxiliary)" or LSD(A), better reflecting their operational role. Four ships were ordered; two from Swan Hunter, and two from BAE Systems Naval Ships.

The Bay-class ships have a full load displacement of 16,160 tonnes (15,900 long tons). Each is 579.4 feet (176.6 m) long, with a beam of 86.6 feet (26.4 m), and a draught of 19 feet (5.8 m). Propulsion power is provided by two Wärtsilä 8L26 generators, providing 6,000 horsepower (4.5 MW), and two Wärtsilä 12V26 generators, providing 9,000 horsepower (6.7 MW). These are used to drive two steerable azimuth thrusters, with a bow thruster supplementing. Maximum speed is 18 knots (33 km/h; 21 mph), and the Bay-class ships can achieve a range of 8,000 nautical miles (15,000 km; 9,200 mi) at 15 knots (28 km/h; 17 mph). Lyme Bay is armed with two 30 mm DS30B cannons, four Mk.44 miniguns, six 7.62mm L7 GPMGs, and two Phalanx CIWS. The standard ship's company consists of 60 officers and sailors.

As a sealift ship, Lyme Bay is capable of carrying up to 24 Challenger 2 tanks or 150 light trucks in 1,150 linear metres of space. The cargo capacity is equivalent of 200 tons of ammunition, or 24 Twenty-foot equivalent unit containers. During normal conditions, a Bay-class ship can carry 356 soldiers, but this can be almost doubled to 700 in overload conditions. Helicopters are not routinely carried on board, but a temporary hangar can be fitted and the flight deck is capable of handling helicopters up to the size of Chinooks, as well as Merlin helicopters and Osprey tiltrotor aircraft. The well dock can carry one LCU Mark 10 or two LCVPs, and two Mexeflotes can be suspended from the ship's flanks. Two 30-ton cranes are fitted between the superstructure and the flight deck.

Lyme Bay and sister ship Largs Bay were ordered from Swan Hunter on 18 December 2000. Lyme Bay was laid down at Swan Hunter's shipyard at Wallsend, Tyne and Wear on 22 November 2002. The ship was launched on 3 September 2005. The Bay class construction project saw major delays and cost overruns, particularly in the Swan Hunter half of the project. Shortly after Largs Bay was handed over to the RFA, Swan Hunter was stripped from the project, with BAE taking full responsibility for the class on 13 June 2006. Lyme Bay was towed to BAE's shipyard in Govan for completion, departing on 16 July and arriving on the River Clyde on 22 July. The ship was the last to be built on the River Tyne. BAE completed construction, and Lyme Bay was dedicated on 26 November 2007; the last ship of the class to enter RFA service.

== Operational history ==
Lyme Bay was deployed for three years on a Maritime Security Patrol in the Persian Gulf, based in Bahrain, acting in a support role of coalition and allied forces. In June 2012, Lyme Bay sailed from Bahrain to return home to undergo a planned refit and regeneration period.

In August 2013, she joined the COUGAR 13 task group. On 16 October 2013 she joined Operation Atalanta, the EU's counter-piracy force off Somalia; she rejoined the COUGAR group in mid-November.

Lyme Bay has deployed for the COUGAR 14 Response Force Task Group exercise.

Between June and December 2015 the ship was on Hurricane watch in the Caribbean and had a Mexeflote and Combat Support Boat (CSB) with their crews from 17 Port & Maritime Regt RLC on board to provide the amphibious capability that had not been seen on APT (North) before. A team of Royal Marines and Royal Engineers were attached on board with a wide range of skill sets along with a Lynx HMA.8 from 234 Flight of 815 Naval Air Squadron for the duration. In September she spent six days off Dominica providing humanitarian and disaster relief following Tropical Storm Erika. This saw the Mexeflote transferring 10 vehicles ashore and 100 tonnes of water and aid, alongside were the HADR team to help the local population. Lyme Bay's assistance was also required by The Bahamas just a few weeks later after devastating effects from Hurricane Joaquin. Lyme Bay finished Atlantic Patrol Tasking (North) in December 2015.

Lyme Bay assisted with the search and recovery of EgyptAir Flight 804 which crashed over the Mediterranean Sea on 19 May 2016.

After 17 Port and Maritime Regt proving the true capabilities of the Mexeflote and LSD(A) Bay-class ships working in unison in 2015 during APT (North), both the Royal Fleet Auxiliary and 17 Port and Maritime Regt have secured a 3-year deployment with both LSD(A) and Mexeflote paired respectively.

An extensive refit in Falmouth took place in 2017. Lyme Bay was returned to the fleet after the refit and sea trials were complete on 8 March 2018. April 2019 saw RFA Lyme Bay take part in Exercise Joint Warrior 19–1, off the coast of northwest Scotland.

In May 2021, Lyme Bay took over as command vessel of 9 Mine Countermeasures Squadron operating from HMS Jufair in Bahrain. In May 2022, Lyme Bay returned to the U.K. for a refit. It was reported that she might be selected for conversion to a future Littoral Strike Ship role. However, the conversion itself was delayed and in July 2022 it was reported that the littoral strike role would in fact be assumed by RFA Argus instead. Lyme Bay herself was earmarked to join Argus as part of Littoral Response Group (South), which was to deploy east of Suez in the latter part of 2023. Lyme Bay and Argus deployed in that role starting in October 2023 with Lyme Bay embarking a company from 40 Commando and Commando Raiding Craft (CRC) from 539 Raiding Squadron RM. It is envisaged that Lyme Bay will be based at the UK Joint Logistics Support Base in Oman. It was subsequently indicated by the Government that she was to remain, for a time, in the Eastern Mediterranean with Argus as part of a broader British regional presence given the outbreak of the Gaza war. It was expected to carry aid materials from Cyprus to Gaza, but eventually delivered its aid to Egypt due to unaddressed safety concerns.

In March 2024, maintenance of Argus and Lyme Bay was undertaken at the Larsen & Toubro's Kattupalli Shipyard in India. This was the first time that a Royal Navy ship had arrived in an Indian shipyard for maintenance. The ships, escorted by HMS Diamond, had transited through the Red Sea to reach India. In April 2024, LRG(S) participated in Maritime Partnership Exercise with Indian Navy's Eastern Fleet in the Indian Ocean. The exercise included stealth frigate INS Sahyadri. The tasks conducted in the exercise included tactical manoeuvres, boarding ops, surface engagement against simulated asymmetric threats, cross deck visits & cross deck helo ops.

In July 2024, both Lyme Bay and Argus deployed to Australia for exercise "Predators Run" which included troops from 40 Commando Royal Marines, and also involved US and Australian forces. In late 2024, Lyme Bay was reported in the Atlantic and paid a four-day visit to Ghana which was to be followed by visits to Nigeria, Sierra Leone and Senegal along with exercises with regional navies.

In June 2025, Lyme Bay began a contractor support maintenance period at the A&P Tyne shipyard. The ship was reported operational again in October 2025, participating in exercise "Arctic Tide" in Norway. However, as of late-2025 Lyme Bay was reportedly laid-up in Gibraltar due to "budgetary restrictions".

In early 2026, in response to the outbreak of the 2026 Iran War, reports suggested that Lyme Bay was again being reactivated, possibly to provide support in the vicinity of the British Sovereign Base Areas on Cyprus. It was subsequently indicated that the ship would be refitted to serve in a mine countermeasures command role for Royal Navy autonomous systems. In May 2026, HMS Stirling Castle arrived in Gibraltar carrying the autonomous vessels RNMB Ariadne and RNMB Halcyon, along with other equipment, for likely operation from RFA Lyme Bay.

RFA Lyme Bay was actively sailing in the Indian Ocean in 2026.
