= George Burton Hunter =

English shipbuilder

Sir George Burton Hunter KBE DSC
- Hunter in 1920
- Born: 19 December 1845; Sunderland, England
- Died: 21 January 1937 (aged 91); Jesmond, England
- Occupation: Shipbuilder

Sir George Burton Hunter KBE DSC (19 December 1845 – 21 January 1937) was an English shipbuilder based on Tyneside.

== Career ==
Born in Sunderland, Hunter was a pupil under Thomas Meek before being apprenticed to William Pile, his cousin. In 1869 he moved to Clydeside where he worked for R. Napier & Sons. He returned to Wearside in 1873 and formed a partnership with S. P. Austin; this partnership was dissolved in 1879 and instead Burton became Manager of a new firm known as C. S. Swan & Hunter on Tyneside. By 1893 the firm was the largest shipbuilder on Tyneside. The business was incorporated in 1895 with Hunter as Chairman.

He became Mayor of Wallsend in 1901 and was knighted in 1918.

Burton acquired Wallsend Hall in 1914 and then presented the hall and its grounds to Wallsend Corporation in 1919: the facility evolved to become the Sir G B Hunter Memorial Hospital.

== Family ==
In 1873 he married Annie Hudson: they went on to have four daughters and two sons. He lived at The Willows in Jesmond in Newcastle upon Tyne.
