= Sir G B Hunter Memorial Hospital =

- Cumbria, Northumberland, Tyne and Wear NHS Foundation Trust
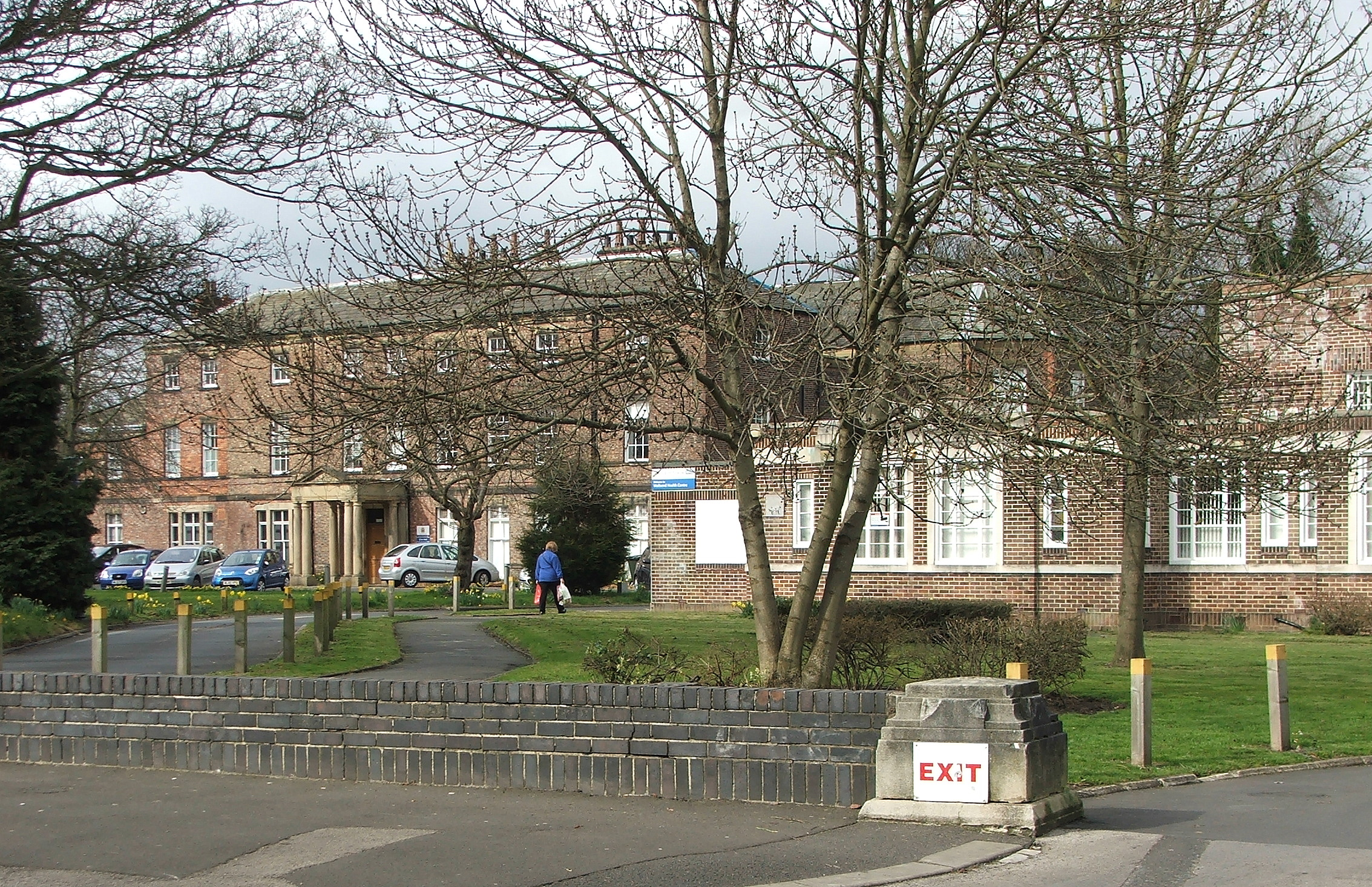
- The old hall on the left and the health centre on the right

- Shown in Tyne and Wear

Geography
- Location: Wallsend, Tyne and Wear, England, United Kingdom
- Coordinates: 54.9962°N 1.5312°W

Organisation
- Care system: Public NHS
- Type: Mental health

Services
- Emergency department: No Accident & Emergency

History
- Founded: 1919

Links
- Lists: Hospitals in England

The Sir G B Hunter Memorial Hospital is a health facility at Wallsend Green, Wallsend, Tyne and Wear, England. It is managed by Cumbria, Northumberland, Tyne and Wear NHS Foundation Trust.

== History ==
The facility has its origins in a private house, known as Wallsend Hall, built in the early 19th century. The hall was originally occupied by William Clark, then by his son-in-law, John Wright, who were both Mayors of Wallsend, and then by Robert Richardson Dees, a local solicitor, before being acquired by Sir George Burton Hunter in 1914. Burton presented the hall and its grounds to Wallsend Corporation in 1919. The site was developed as a hospital in the 1920s and extended to the east in the 1940s to create the current health centre. The hospital joined the National Health Service in 1948. The hall itself was re-designated for municipal use in the 1950s.
