= Swan Hunter =

Shipbuilding company based in England

Coordinates: 54.98675°N 1.52856°W

- Type: Private
- Industry: Shipbuilding; Naval architecture Offshore installation services
- Founded: 1880; 146 years ago
- Headquarters: Wallsend, Tyne and Wear, England
- Key people: Gerard Kroese, (Director)
- Number of employees: 25 including contractors (2017)
- Website: swanhunter.com

Swan Hunter, formerly known as Swan, Hunter & Wigham Richardson and originally known as C. S. Swan & Hunter, is a shipbuilding design, engineering, and management company, based in Wallsend, Tyne and Wear, England.

At its apex, the company represented the combined forces of three powerful shipbuilding families: Swan, Hunter and Wigham Richardson.

The company was responsible for some of the greatest ships of the early 20th century, most famously RMS Mauretania which held the Blue Riband for the fastest crossing of the Atlantic, and RMS Carpathia which rescued survivors from RMS Titanic.

In 2006 Swan Hunter ceased vessel construction on Tyneside, but continues to provide design engineering services.

== History ==
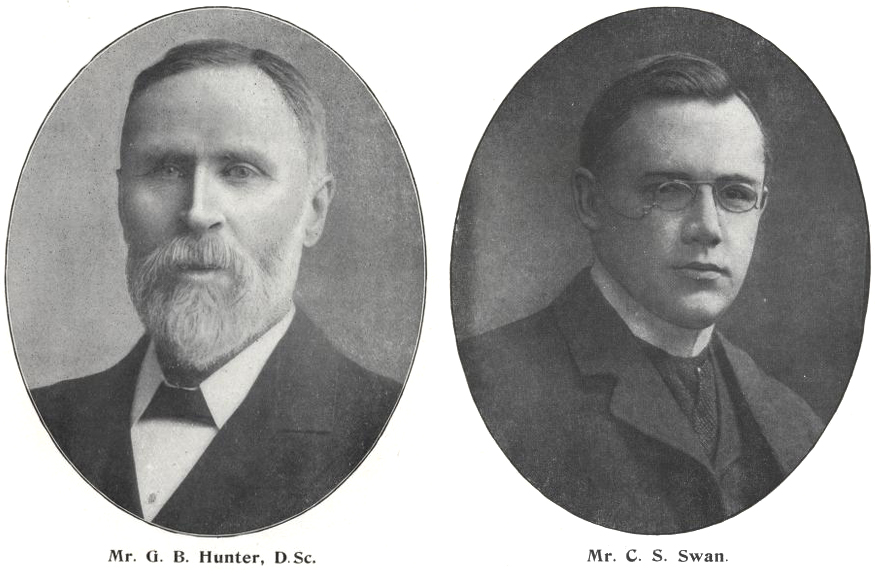
Shipbuilders G B Hunter and C S Swan (Jr) in 1907

=== Early history ===
Shipbuilding began on what would become C. S. Swan & Hunter's Middle Yard in 1873 under Coulson, Cooke & Co. owned by shipbuilder Charles Mitchell. Mitchell had worked under John Coutts nearby in Low Walker until 1852 when he started his own business, steadily expanding until breaking ground on the new site with two of his associates in 1873.

However, in 1874 the joint venture failed and Mitchell took over, delegating management to his brother-in-law Charles Sheridan Swan, taking the name C. S. Swan & Co.

Charles Sheridan Swan died in 1879 in an accident at sea, his son and heir Charles Sheriton Swan was only nine years old. Charles Sheriton Swan would go on to serve an apprenticeship at the Wallsend Slipway & Engineering Company which would later be absorbed by the company.

The East Yard was founded on the site of the Wallsend Chemical Works, which underwent a change of ownership in 1883. By 1891, C. S. Swan & Hunter had purchased the land and extended the yard onto it, expanding from three building berths or slipways to six. Two of these were large, covered slipways with electric gantry cranes, an innovative construction method for the time.

The site that would become the West Yard was originally that of Schlesinger, Davis & Co. from 1863 until 1893. The site was purchased by C. S. Swan & Hunter in 1897.

John Wigham Richardson founded the Neptune Works nearby in 1860, on the site previously occupied by Coutts.

=== C. S. Swan & Hunter ===
C. S. Swan & Hunter was founded by Sunderland shipbuilder George Burton Hunter, in partnership with Mary, the widow of Charles Sheridan Swan in 1880.

Hunter had recently dissolved his partnership with S. P. Austin in Sunderland and entered negotiations with Charles Mitchell and H. F. Swan, brother of Charles Sheridan Swan. They brokered the partnership, placing Hunter as the managing director. Charles Sheriton Swan would later become a director by 1903.

C. S. Swan & Hunter launched the largest cargo steamer then afloat, the 7,323 GRT Milwaukee, in 1896, and quickly broke their own record by launching the 9,041 GRT Monarch the following year for Furness, Withy & Co. The following year they were commissioned to produce another cargo vessel, this one of 8,056 GRT for Christopher Furness, but this was purchased before launch by Cunard Line for £115,000, who named the vessel SS Ultonia.

Around the time they purchased Ultonia, Cunard placed an order for what was known as an 'intermediate' liner. Not as fast as RMS Lucania, not as large as RMS Oceanic, but fast enough and large enough to pay well. This new ship was named RMS Ivernia, launched in 1899. She was Cunard's largest ship at time of launch.

The success and flexibility of Ivernia and her sister ship Saxonia (built at John Brown & Company, Clydebank), that protected Cunard from fluctuations in seasonal passenger trade, prompted Cunard to order a third, smaller ship of the same class from C. S. Swan & Hunter. This ship was launched in 1902 as RMS Carpathia and was later made famous for her role in the aftermath of the sinking of the RMS Titanic in 1912.

=== Swan, Hunter & Wigham Richardson ===
In 1903, C. S. Swan & Hunter merged with Wigham Richardson (founded by John Wigham Richardson as Neptune Works in 1860), specifically to bid for the important contract to build RMS Mauretania on behalf of Cunard. Their bid was successful, and the new company, Swan Hunter and Wigham Richardson Ltd, went on to build what was to become, in its day, the most famous oceangoing liner in the world. Also in 1903, the Company took a controlling interest in the Wallsend Slipway & Engineering Company, which was an early licensed manufacturer of Parsons steam turbine engines, which enabled Mauretania to achieve her great speed. Mauretania was launched from Wallsend on 20 September 1906 by the Duchess of Roxburghe. The firm expanded rapidly in the early part of the twentieth century, acquiring the Glasgow-based Barclay Curle in 1912.

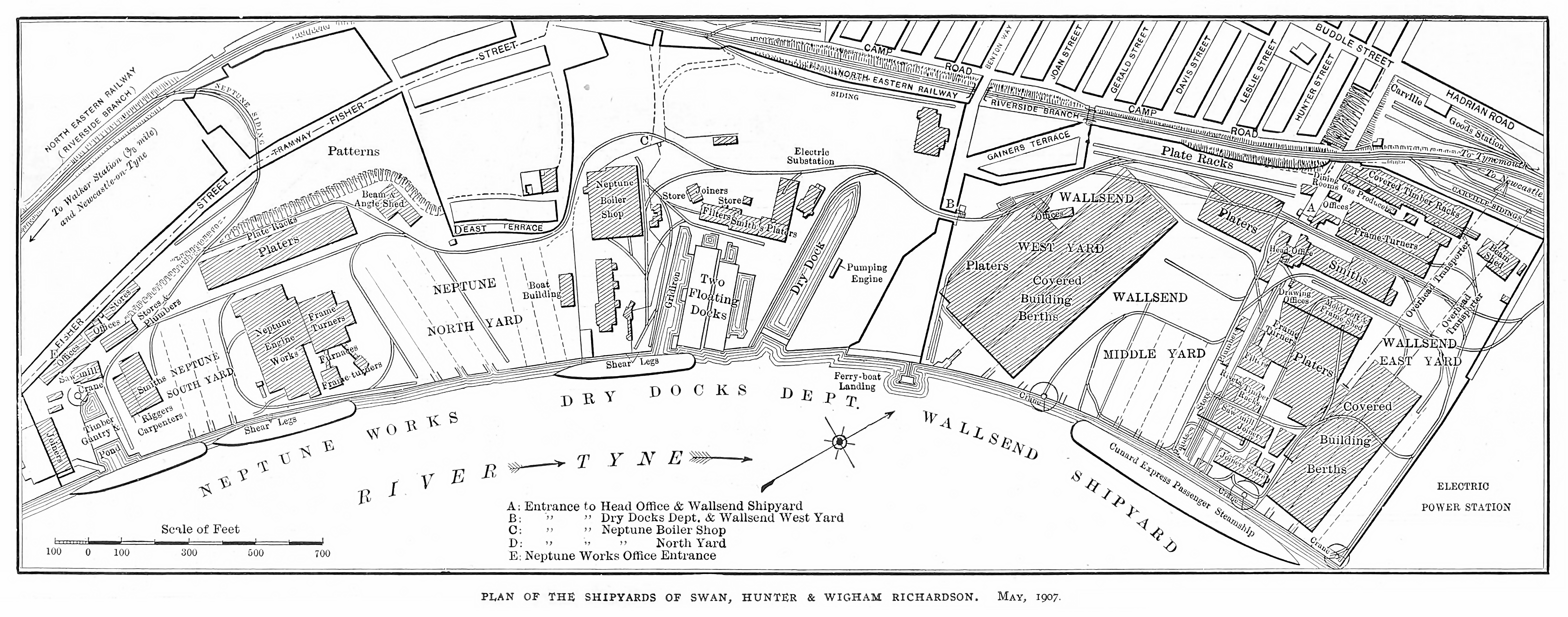
Plan of the Shipyards of Swan, Hunter & Wigham Richardson in 1907

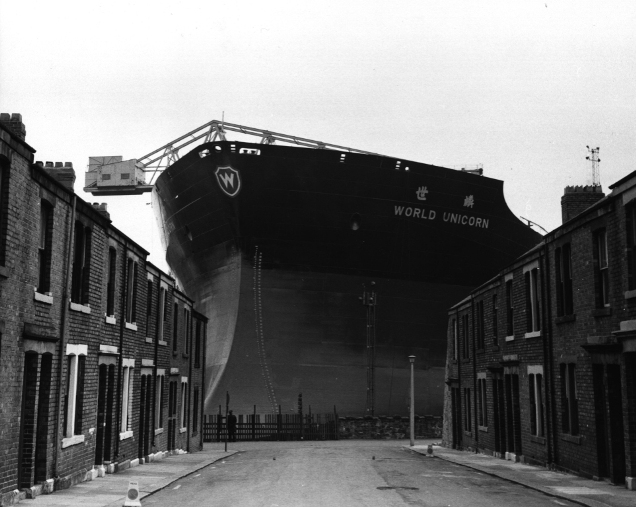
World Unicorn, built by Swan Hunter at the Wallsend shipyard, Tyneside, in 1973.

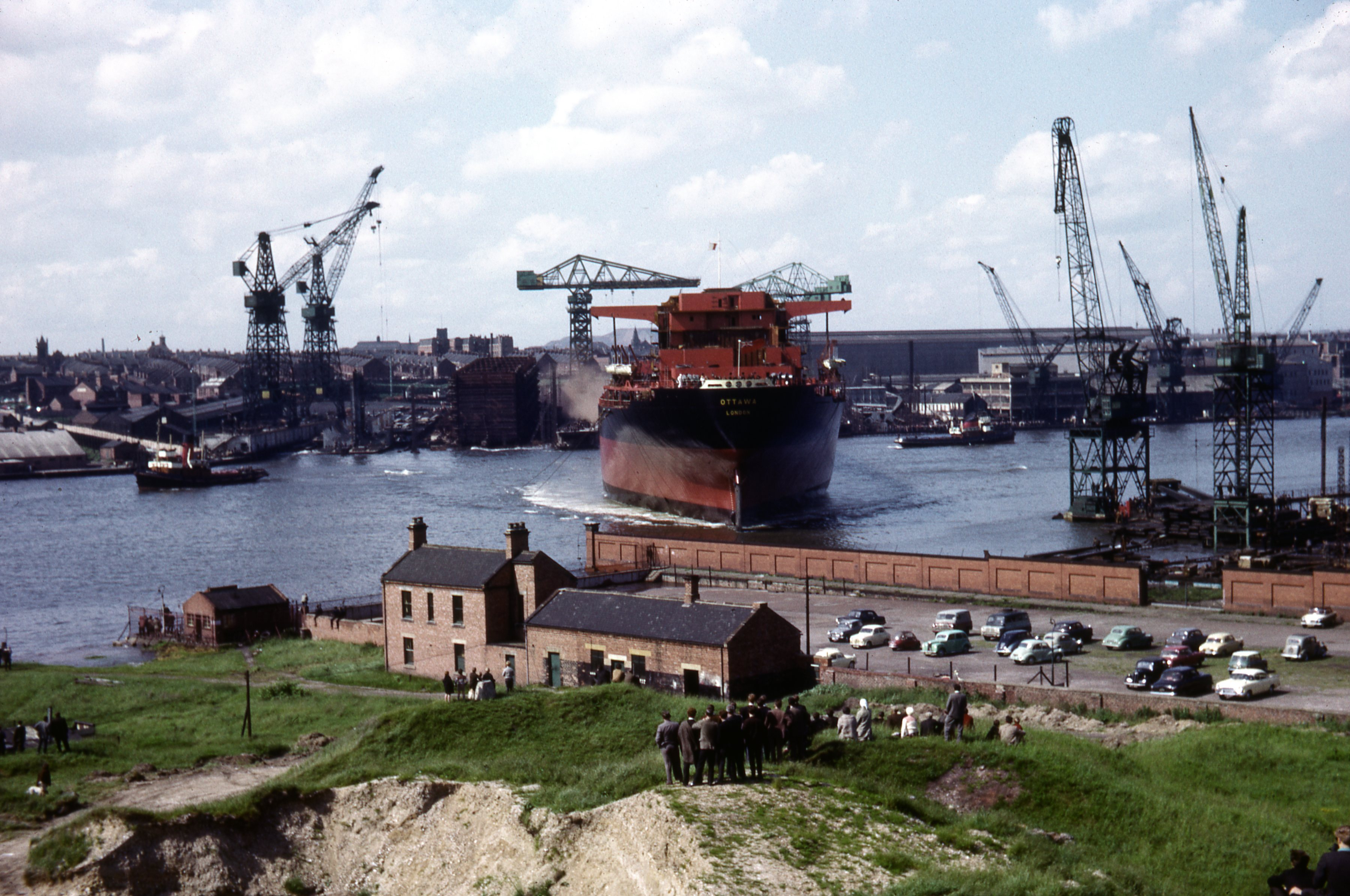
Tanker Ottawa launch, Wallsend shipyard, circa 1964

=== Swan Hunter & Tyne ===
In 1966, Swan Hunter & Wigham Richardson merged with Smiths Dock Company to form Associated Shipbuilders, which later became Swan Hunter Group. Following the publication of the Geddes Report recommending rationalisation in British shipbuilding, the Company went on to acquire Clelands Shipbuilding Company and John Readhead & Sons in 1967. Meanwhile, Swan Hunter inherited both the Naval Yard at High Walker on the River Tyne of Vickers-Armstrongs and the Hebburn Yard of Hawthorn Leslie in 1968. In 1973 further expansion came with the purchase of Palmers Dock at Hebburn from Vickers-Armstrongs.

Then in 1977, Swan Hunter Group was nationalised as part of British Shipbuilders. The former flagship of the Royal Navy, HMS Ark Royal was built at Swan Hunter during this period, entering service in 1985.

=== Swan Hunter ===
The Company was privatised again in 1987 but decided to close its Neptune Yard in 1988. It was then forced to call in the receivers when the UK government awarded the contract for HMS Ocean to Kvaerner Govan in 1993. The receiver took steps to break up the business. However, the main shipyard in Wallsend was bought out from receivership by Jaap Kroese, a Dutch millionaire. The yard subsequently undertook several ad-hoc ship repair and conversion projects for private-sector customers.

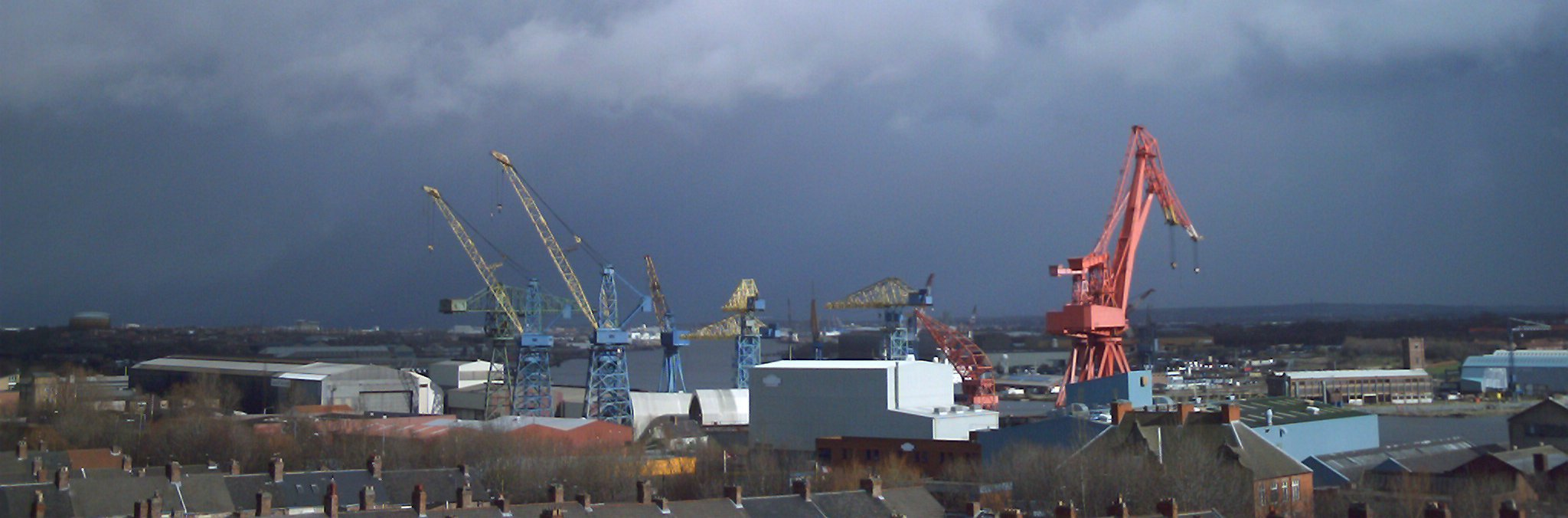
A view of the Wallsend shipyard shortly after its closure

In 2000, Swan Hunter was awarded the contract to design and build two (Auxiliary) Landing Ship Dock ships for the Royal Fleet Auxiliary with two other ships being built by BAE Systems Naval Ships: the cost of the two Swan Hunter ships was to be £210 million including £62 million for lead yard services, with an inservice date of 2004. By July 2006, the costs had risen to £309 million and only one ship had been delivered. As a result of this, the second ship RFA Lyme Bay was transferred to BAE Systems Govan in Glasgow for completion.

In 2001, Swan Hunter acquired Kværner's Port Clarence offshore yard at Teesside but then in 2006 sold it to Wilton Engineering Group.

In November 2006, after the failure to complete Lyme Bay within budget and resulting exclusion from future Royal Navy shipbuilding projects, Jaap Kroese announced that the business was effectively finished and placed the Wallsend Yard's iconic cranes up for sale. He also said that he was actively looking for a buyer for the land. During this time, Lyme Bay's earlier sister ship, Largs Bay, was noted as the last ship to be built and fully completed by Swan Hunter. In April 2007, Swan Hunter's cranes, along with its floating dock and other equipment, were sold to Bharati Shipyards, India's second-largest private-sector shipbuilder. The entire plant machinery and equipment from Swan Hunter was dismantled and transported to India over six months to be rebuilt at Bharati Shipyards.

Swan's performed the conceptual design of Pioneering Spirit, provisionally named Pieter Schelte, the world's largest platform installation/decommissioning and pipelay vessel. The basic design of the lifting systems was completed by the end of 2008, and detailed design of the hulls by May 2010.

In 2008, the company said it was concentrating on ship design with just under 200 people employed.

In 2016, Jaap Kroese died but the company said it would continue with its business of ship design. At the time, the company had 40 employees and contractors.

Also in 2016, Swan Hunter was relaunched into the subsea industry by Gerard Kroese, the eldest son of former owner Jaap Kroese. Swan Hunter started to offer specialist equipment, design, engineering & project management services to the offshore renewables and subsea oil & gas energy markets. On 12 October 2016, the company announced the issue of a letter of intent for the design and build of a basket carousel loading tower. The company announced further equipment pool growth through a 15Te tensioner and 450Te reel drive system. Swan Hunter announced loading tower readiness on 5 May 2017 with completion of mobilisation onto EMAS Chiyoda Subsea's multi-lay vessel 'Lewek Constellation' shortly thereafter.

== Operations ==
The Company owned three main yards:

- The Neptune Yard at Walker-on-Tyne inherited from Wigham Richardson (opened in 1860 and closed in 1988)
- The Wallsend West Yard at Wallsend inherited from Charles Sheridan Swan (opened in 1842 and closed in 2006)
- The Naval Yard at High Walker inherited from Vickers-Armstrongs (opened in 1912 and closed during the 1980s)

All three were on the north side of the River Tyne. The company also owned the Wallsend Slipway & Engineering Company, the yard that built the engines for the Mauretania, from 1903 until the 1980s. At various times Swan Hunter also owned Palmers Hebburn Yard, Hawthorn Leslie Hebburn Yard and Readheads at South Shields which were all on the south side of the River Tyne.

== Ships built by Swan Hunter ==
Naval vessels

- Centaur-class aircraft carrier
  - HMS Albion
- Invincible-class aircraft carriers
  - HMS Ark Royal
  - HMS Illustrious
- Colossus-class aircraft carrier
  - HMS Vengeance
- Nairana-class escort carrier
  - HMS Vindex
- King George V-class battleship
  - HMS Anson (1942)
- Town-class cruiser
  - HMS Edinburgh (1938)
- Crown Colony-class cruisers
  - HMS Gambia (1940)
  - HMS Mauritius (1941)
- Acorn-class destroyer
  - HMS Hope
- Battle-class destroyers
  - HMS Barfleur
  - HMS Corunna
  - HMS Gabbard
  - HMS Trafalgar
- Daring-class destroyer
  - HMS Daring
- Hunt-class destroyers
  - HMS Bolebroke
  - HMS Border
  - HMS Calpe
  - HMS Eridge
  - HMS Exmoor
  - HMS Farndale
  - HMS Grove
  - HMS Hambledon
  - HMS Heythrop
  - HMS Hursley
  - HMS Holderness
- Tribal-class destroyer
  - HMS Somali
- A-class destroyers
  - HMS Codrington
- B-class destroyers
  - HMS Brilliant
  - HMS Bulldog
- E-class destroyers
  - HMS Esk
  - HMS Express
- H-class destroyers
  - HMS Hunter
  - HMS Hyperion
- J-class destroyer
  - HMS Janus
- K-class destroyer
  - HMS Khartoum
- M-class destroyer
  - HMS Marmion
  - HMS Martial
  - HMS Mary Rose
  - HMS Matchless
  - HMS Menace
  - HMS Nessus
  - HMS Nestor
  - HMS Pasley
- U and V-class destroyer
  - HMS Grenville
  - HMS Ulster
  - HMS Vigilant
  - HMS Virago
- V-class destroyers
  - HMS Vimiera
  - HMS Violent
  - HMS Vittoria
- W-class destroyers
  - HMS Whirlwind
  - HMS Wrestler
- Type 82 destroyer
  - HMS Bristol
- Type 42 destroyers
  - HMS Newcastle
  - HMS Glasgow
  - HMS Exeter
  - HMS York
- Type 14 (or Blackwood-class) anti-submarine frigates
  - HMS Russell
  - HMS Pellew
- Type 22 frigates
  - HMS Chatham
  - HMS Coventry
  - HMS Sheffield
- Type 23 frigates
  - HMS Marlborough
  - HMS Westminster
  - HMS Northumberland
  - HMS Richmond
- Hastings-class sloop
  - HMS Scarborough
- Ness-class combat stores ship
  - RFA Lyness
  - RFA Stromness
  - RFA Tarbatness
- Fort Victoria-class replenishment oiler
  - RFA Fort George
- Rover-class tankers
  - RFA Black Rover (1973)
  - RFA Gold Rover (1973)
- Bay-class landing ships
  - RFA Largs Bay
  - RFA Lyme Bay – Completed by BAE Systems
- IRIS Kharg (1977)

Commercial vessels

- Abukir (1920)
- Achiever (circa 1984)
- Afrique (1907)
- Antarctic (1913)
- Arawa (1907)
- Ariosto (1940)
- Atlantic Causeway (1969)
- Atlantic Conveyor (1970)
- Augustina (1927)
- Aurania (1916)
- Ascania (1911)
- Badagry Palm (1) (1956)
- Bamenda Palm (1) (1958)
- Bello (1930)
- British Admiral (1917)
- British Character (1941)
- British Coast (1919)
- British Colony (1927)
- British Diligence (1937)
- British Dominion (1928)
- British Empress (1917)
- British Endurance (1936)
- British Fame (1936)
- British Fusilier (1923)
- British Governor (1926)
- British Gratitude (1942)
- British Grenadier (1922)
- British Gunner (1922)
- British Harmony (1941)
- British Hussar (1923)
- British Influence (1939)
- British Motorist (1924)
- British Petrol (1925)
- British Pluck (1928)
- British Resolution (1937)
- British Respect (1943)
- British Sailor (1918)
- British Scout (1922)
- British Star (1918)
- British Tenacity (1939)
- British Thrift (1928)
- British Union (1927)
- British Virtue (1945)
- British Viscount (1921)
- CA Larsen (1913)
- RMS Carpathia (1902)
- City of Canterbury (1922)
- City of Lyons (1926)
- City of Oxford (1926)
- City of Paris (1922)
- Corte (1906)
- Coslar (1906)
- Derbyshire (1976)
- Dimboola (1912)
- QSMV Dominion Monarch (1938)
- TSS Dover (1965)
- Duntroon (1935)
- Dwarka (1947)
- Elmina Palm (1957)
- Enugu Palm (1958)
- RMS Franconia (1910)
- Frontenac (1928)
- Germanic (1931)
- Ghandara (circa 1976)
- Ibadan Palm (1959)
- Ikeja Palm (1961)
- Ilesha Palm (1961)
- Ilorin Palm (1959)
- Inanda (1925)
- Imbricaria (1935)
- Ivernia (1899)
- Jean Brillant (1935)
- Kano Palm (1958)
- Katsina Palm (1957)
- Kittiwake (1906)
- RMS Knight of Malta (1929)
- Kowloon Bridge (1973)
- Kyle (1913)
- RMS Laconia (1911)
- RMS Laconia (1921)
- Lagos Palm (1961)
- TS Leda (1952)
- Lida (1938)
- Lindenfels (1906)
- Lobito Palm (1960)
- Lowenburg (1907)
- Matadi Palm (1970)
- RMS Mauretania (1906)
- Megantic (1962)
- Miraflores (1921)
- Mitra (1912)
- Moyra (1931)
- Mytilus (1916)
- Neverita (1944)
- Nidarnes (1926)
- Northenden (1886) For Manchester Sheffield and Lincolnshire Railway - later Great Central Railway
- Opopo Palm (1942)
- Port Adelaide (1911)
- Port Alma (1928)
- Port Auckland (1949)
- Port Brisbane (1949)
- Port Chalmers (1933)
- Port Elliot (1910)
- Port Fairy (1928)
- Port Gisborne (1927)
- Port Halifax (1937)
- Port Hobart (1925)
- Port Huon (1927)
- Port Jackson (1937)
- Port Lincoln (1946)
- Port Macquarie (1944)
- Port Napier (1940)
- Port New Plymouth (1960)
- Port Phillip (1942)
- Port Pirie (1947)
- Port Sydney (1955)
- Port Townsville (1935)
- Port Victor (1942)
- Port Vindex (1944)
- Powerful (1903)
- Prince George (1910)
- Prince Rupert (1910)
- Príncipe Perfeito (1961)
- Provence (1951)
- Ranella (1912)
- TEV Rangatira (1971)
- Rauenfels (1907)
- Regulus (1907)
- Reina Victoria-Eugenia (1912)
- Rosalind (1890)
- Saint Clair (1929)
- Sir Parkes (1951)
- South Africa (1930)
- Spartan (1890)
- Stephano (1965)
- Tamahine (1925)
- Toiler (1910)
- Venezia (1907)
- Victoria (1902)
- Vikingen III (1929)
- Vistafjord (1972)
- Volo (1938)
- Waterford (1912)
- SS Warrington (1886) For Manchester Sheffield and Lincolnshire Railway – later Great Central Railway)
- Zenda (1932)

Cable ships

- Alert
- All America
- Ariel
- Bullfinch
- Bullfrog
- Bullhead
- Cambria
- Colonia
- Dominia
- Edward Wilshaw
- Emile Baudot
- Guardian
- Iris
- John W. Mackay
- Lord Kelvin
- Marie Louise Mackay
- Monarch
- Pacific Guardian (1984)
- Patrol
- Recorder
- Sir Eric Sharp (Launched 1988 – renamed CS IT Intrepid )
- St. Margarets
- Stanley Angwin
- Telconia

Bulk Carrier

- Hoegh Duke (1984)
- Robkap IV (1977)
- Liverpool Bridge Renamed to the MV Derbyshire (1976)

Research Vessels

- CSS Acadia (1913)
- HMCS Cartier (later renamed HMCS Charny)
- RRS James Clark Ross Polar survey

Tankers

- Shell Supplier (1946)
- ARA Punta Médanos (1950)
- Velutina (1950)
- Velletia (1952)
- Helix (1953)
- Helcion (1954)
- Heldia (1955)
- Helisoma (1956)
- Volvula (1956)
- Llanishen (1957)
- Zaphon (1957)
- Varicella (1959)
- Solen (1961)
- Ottawa (1964)
- Sir Winston Churchill (1964)
- Clementine Churchill (1965)
- Narica (1967)
- Nacella (1968)
- Esso Northumbria (1969)
- Esso Hibernia (1970)
- Stolt Lion(1970) Chemical carrier
- Faraday (1970) Liquified petroleum gas tanker
- Texaco Great Britain (1971)
- London Lion (1972)
- Frank D. Moores (1973)
- World Unicorn (1973)
- Windsor Lion (1974)
- Tyne Pride (1975)
- Everett F. Wells (1976)
- BP Achiever (1983)

== Battleship Potemkin ==
On 1 May 2006, British pop-duo Pet Shop Boys performed their soundtrack to the 1925 Soviet silent film Battleship Potemkin alongside the Royal Northern Sinfonia at the shipyard.

== See also ==
- List of shipbuilders and shipyards
