= Wallsend Slipway & Engineering Company =

UK ship repairing company

- Company type: Private
- Industry: Shiprepairing
- Founded: 1871
- Defunct: 1903
- Fate: Acquired
- Successor: Swan Hunter
- Headquarters: Point Pleasant, UK

Wallsend Slipway & Engineering Company Ltd was formerly an independent company, located on the River Tyne at Point Pleasant, near Wallsend, Tyne & Wear, around a mile downstream from the Swan Hunter shipyard, with which it later merged.

== History ==
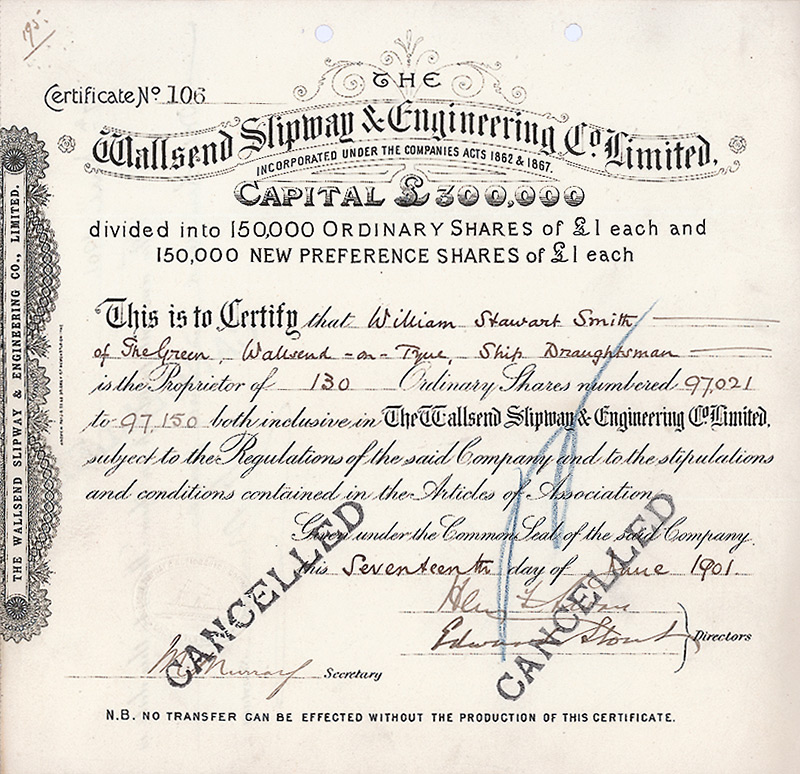
Share of the Wallsend Slipway & Engineering Company Ltd from the 17. June 1901

The Company was formed by Charles Mitchell, a shipbuilder, in November 1871 as The Wallsend Slipway Co. with the objective of repairing the shipping vessels of various shipowners with whom he had recently established a business relationship.

One of the first ships repaired was the Earl Percy berthed in 1873.

In 1874 Willam Boyd was appointed managing director and it was Boyd who introduced marine engine building to the firm - this becoming over the next decade its most important activity - which brought the words 'Engineering' into the full title of the firm which then became ' The Wallsend Slipway and Engineering Co Ltd'. In 1903 Swan Hunter took a controlling interest in the Company.

The company manufactured Parsons turbines under license for ships including the famous RMS Mauretania and numerous British warships.

In 1977 the business was nationalised and became part of British Shipbuilders. The site then passed to AMEC which operated it as part of an offshore facility known as the Hadrian Yard: it was responsible for pre-fabricated construction of the Gateshead Millennium Bridge completed in 2001 and also conducted fitting out of the Bonga FPSO in 2003.

Amec mothballed the yard in 2004. It was announced in April 2008 that the site was to be sold and then in November 2008 the site was acquired by Shepherd Offshore.

In March 2009, SLP, a Suffolk-based engineering business, announced that it would lease part of the yard from Shepherd Offshore to build offshore gas production platforms for the North Sea.

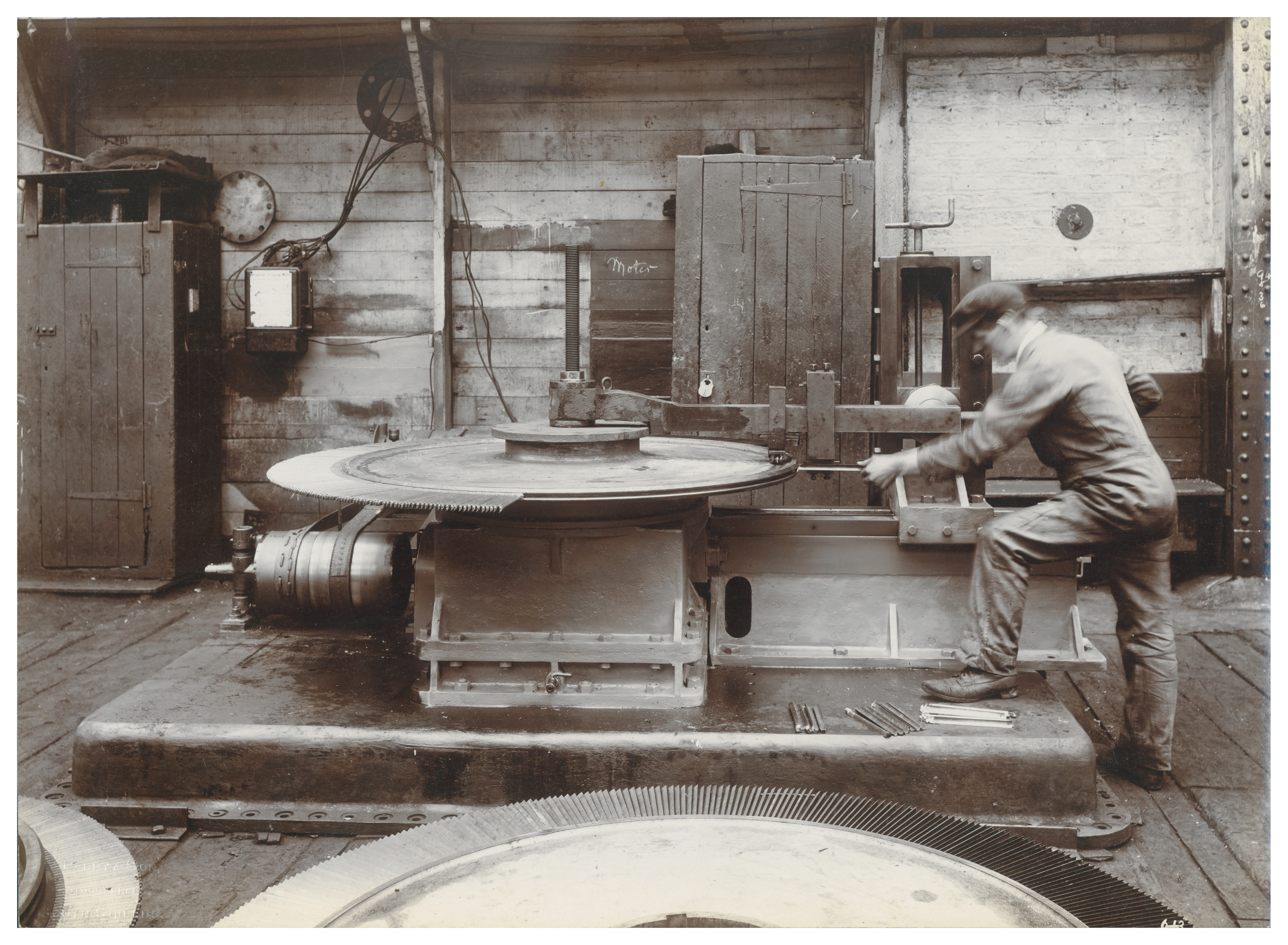
Wallsend Slipway Worker Operating Turbine Blading Machine. Original photo is in Tyne & Wear Archives.
