= Point Pleasant, Wallsend =

Area of Wallsend, Tyne and Wear, England

Point Pleasant is part of the town of Wallsend, Tyne and Wear, England, lying between the town centre and the River Tyne.

The historic area was once the home of Wallsend Slipway & Engineering Company, which built engines for some of the most famous ships constructed on the Tyne. The site is now owned by Shepherd Offshore.

Point Pleasant Hall was an historic mansion dating back several hundred years, until most of it was demolished in the 1930s. During this demolition, an abandoned tunnel was found in the main hall which it is believed may have led to Jarrow Monastery, although this has never been substantiated. In late 2009, the one remaining wing of the old hall (subsequently known as Point Pleasant House) was demolished pending further development.

Today, Point Pleasant is made up of two streets of terraced houses and six semi-detached properties, originally built for senior staff at the Slipway.

The site of the former Point Pleasant Station, on the former Riverside Loop of the Tyneside Electric network, can still be identified. The station was closed in 1973.

Famous ex-residents include Charlie Hardwick (born Claire Elizabeth Hardwick; 3 November 1960)[2], an English actress well known for her part in ITV's Emmerdale as Val Pollard.
