= Mexeflote =

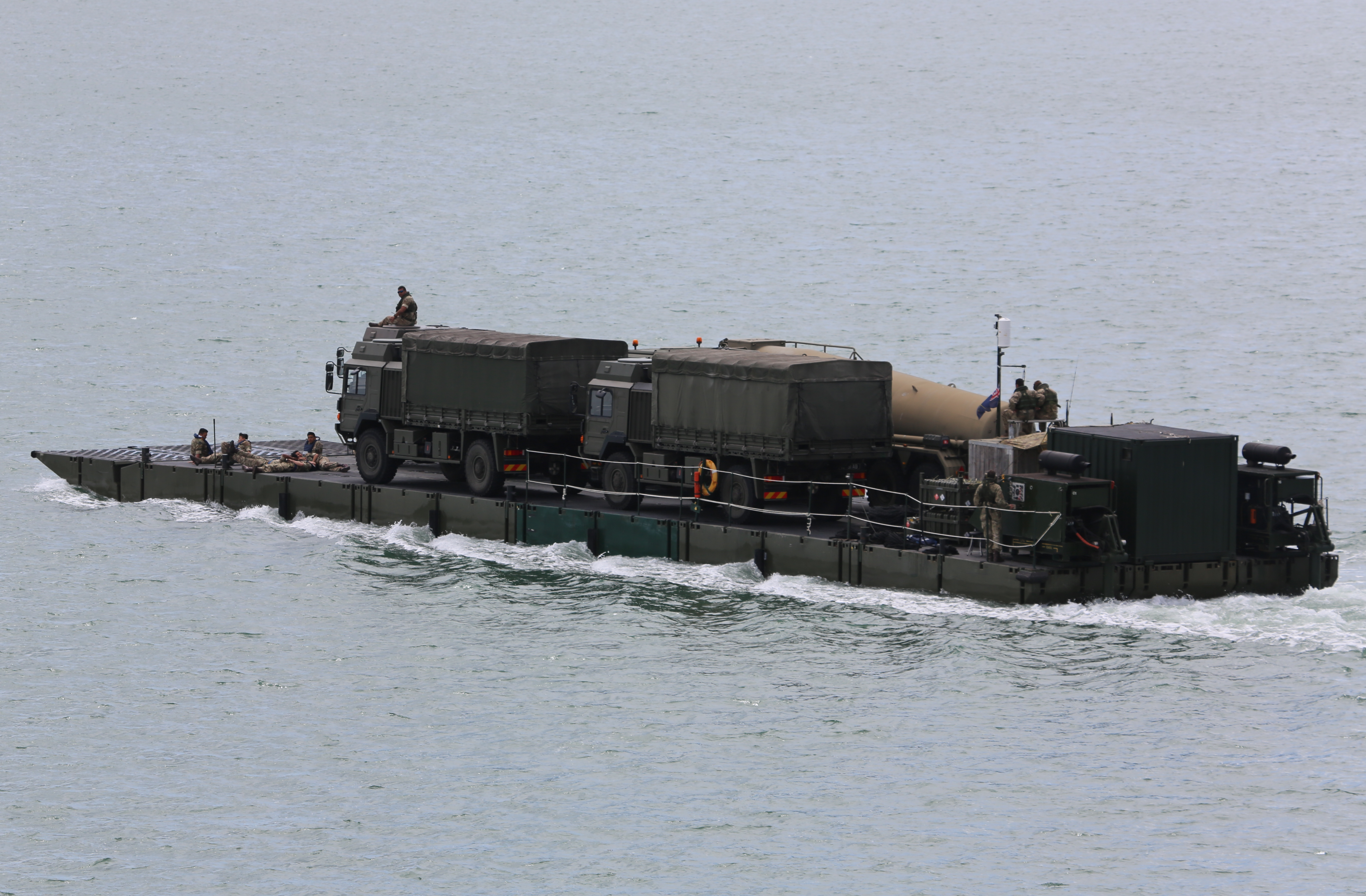
- A Mexeflote raft
- Type: Landing raft
- Place of origin: United Kingdom

Specifications
- Length: Standard: 20.12 m (66 ft 0 in); Maxi: 38.41 m (126 ft 0 in)
- Width: Standard: 7.42 m (24 ft 4 in); Maxi 12.20 m (40 ft 0 in)
- Crew: 6
- Engine: 2 × Hydromaster 6 cyl. diesel engines at 75 hp (56 kW) each or 2 × Thrustmaster OD150N propulsion units 150 hp (110 kW) combined
- Payload capacity: Standard: 60,000 kg (130,000 lb); Larger: 120,000 kg (260,000 lb); Largest: 180,000 kg (400,000 lb)

The Mexeflote is a landing raft used by the United Kingdom's Royal Logistic Corps and the Royal Australian Navy to move goods and vehicles between ship and shore. It was first used by British military in the 1960s. It was used during the Falklands War, and has been used in humanitarian aid missions. The system was developed from the earlier Rhino ferry. The Mexeflote is named after the Military Engineering Experimental Establishment (MEXE) in the UK where it was designed, in conjunction with the neologism "flote" instead of "float".

== History ==
The Mexeflote was introduced to the UK military in the 1960s, and it subsequently saw service in the Falklands War, in which three units were used, including in Southampton, where they were used in loading the Royal Fleet Auxiliary and Royal Navy ships going to the Falklands. Mexeflotes were used as causeways between ships in the open ocean, stores were driven between ships over a Mexeflote causeway with Fiat Allis forklifts. Sergeant Boultby of 17 Port Regiment, RCT was awarded the Military Medal for using his Mexeflote to rescue survivors at Bluff Cove.

In February 1983 a Mexeflote was used to move a Short Sandringham flying boat from Lee-on-Solent to Southampton docks from where it would then be moved to Southampton Hall of Aviation which was then under construction.

In 1994, the British Army ordered an additional 50 units, and in 2000 they upgraded 60 of the rafts. The Mexeflote was used during the 2010 Haiti earthquake, to transport supplies to the remote Haitian village of Anse-à-Veau from RFA Largs Bay.

The rafts are crewed by the Royal Logistic Corps and they are largely used by the Royal Fleet Auxiliary's Bay-class landing ships. As part of the Royal Australian Navy's acquisition of the Bay-class ship RFA Largs Bay (renamed HMAS Choules for Australian service), two Mexeflotes were also acquired.

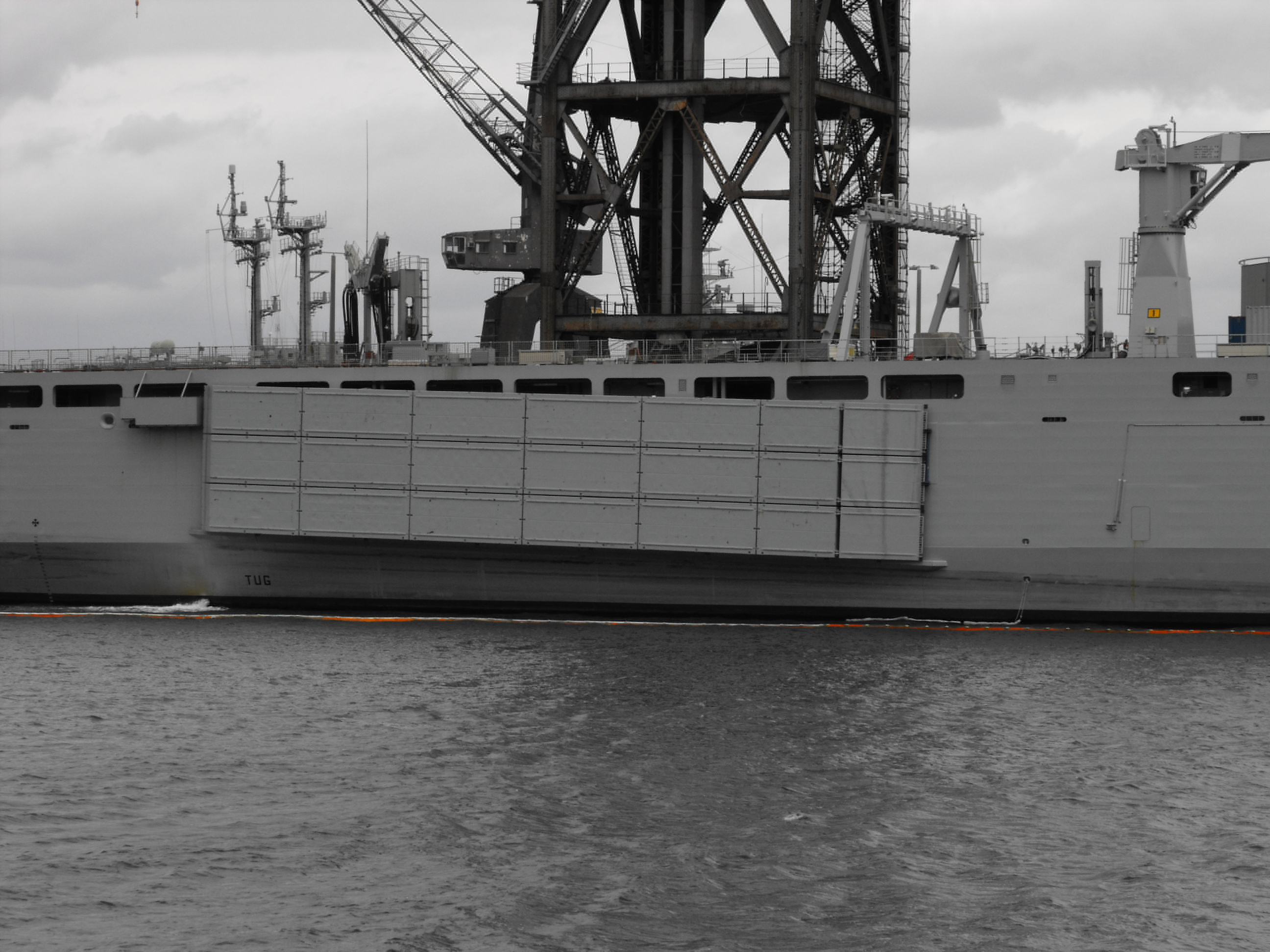
A Mexeflote suspended from the starboard flank of HMAS Choules

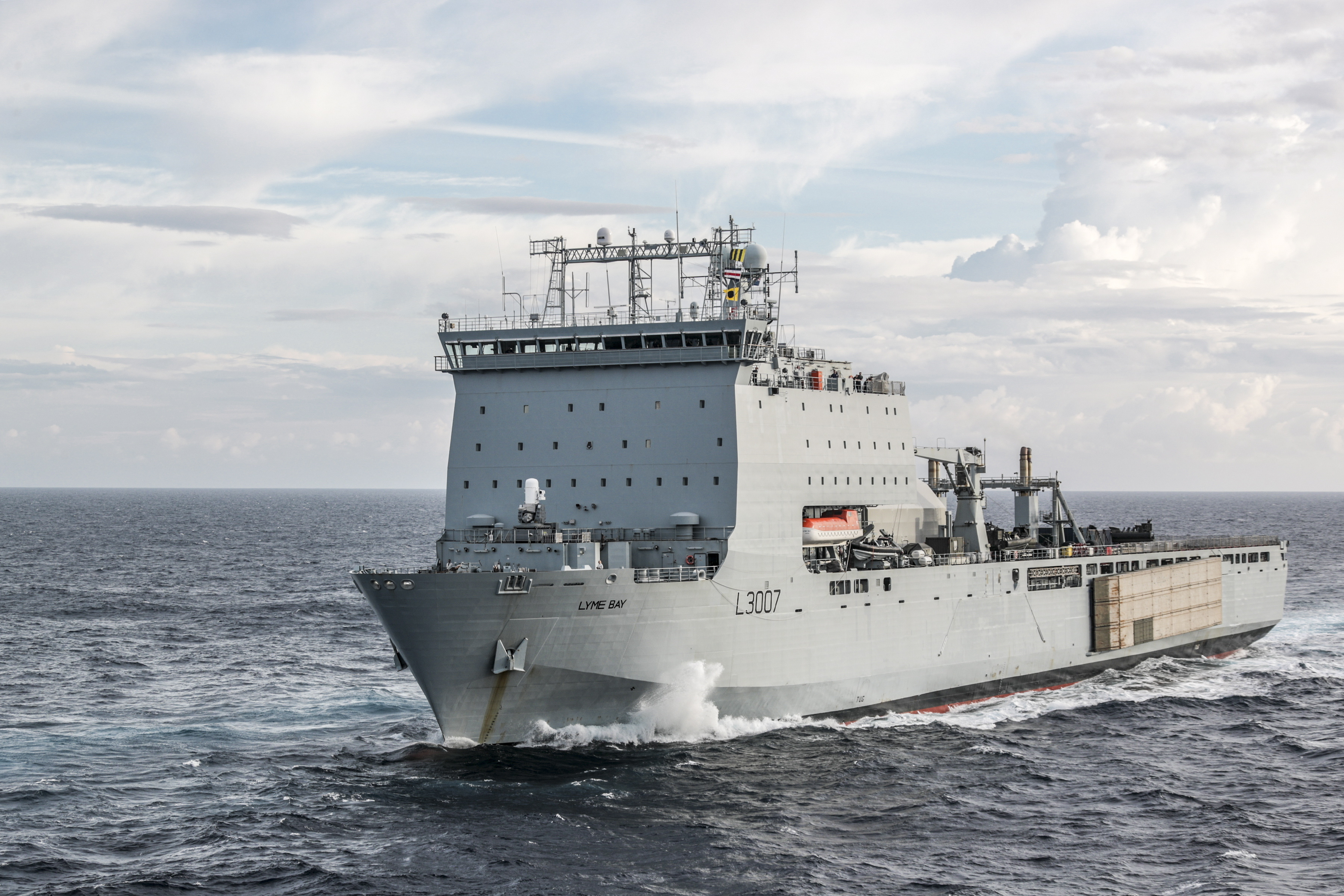
RFA Lyme Bay with a Mexeflote on its port side

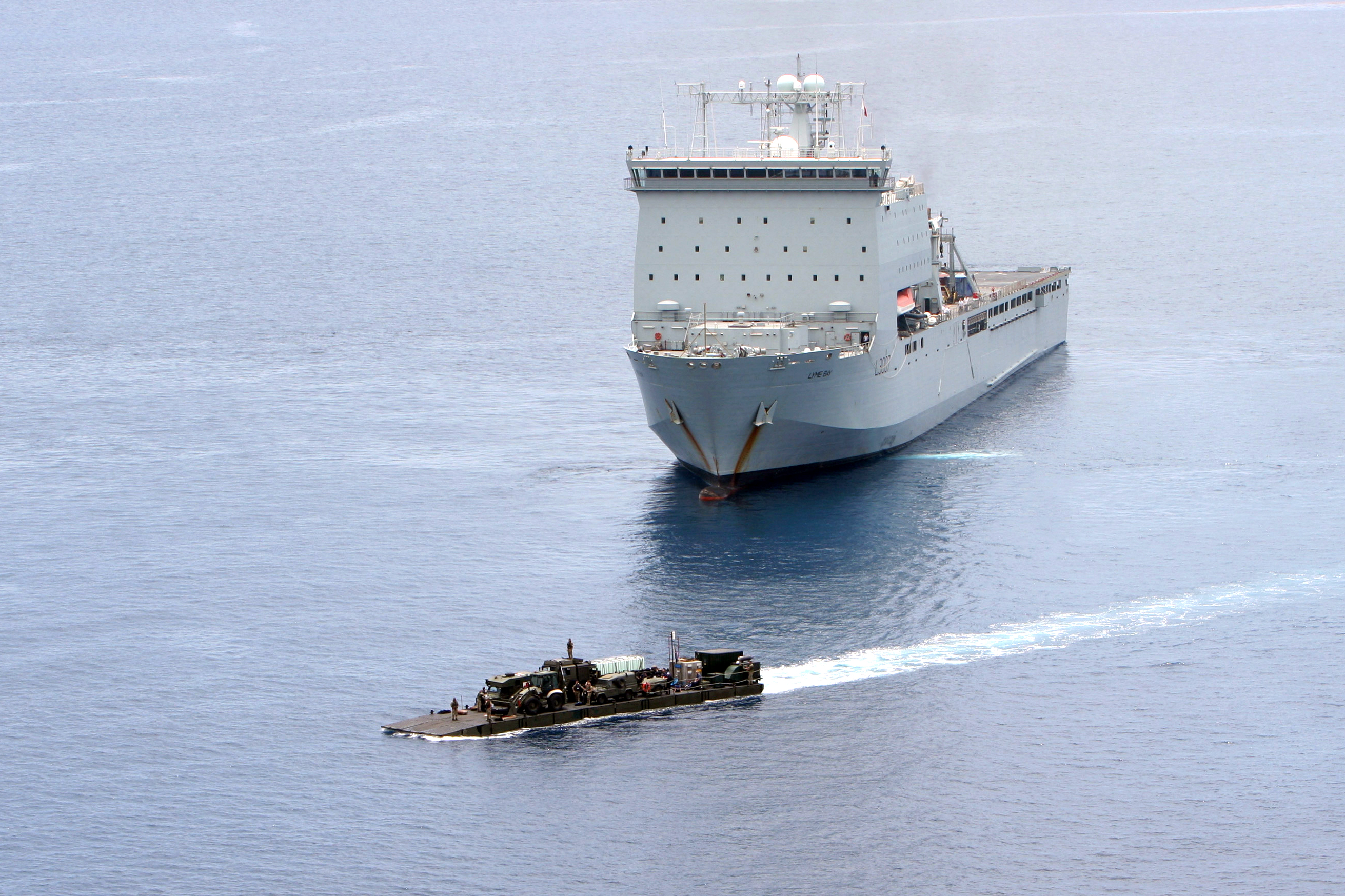
Mexeflote transporting disaster relief teams ashore from RFA Lyme Bay

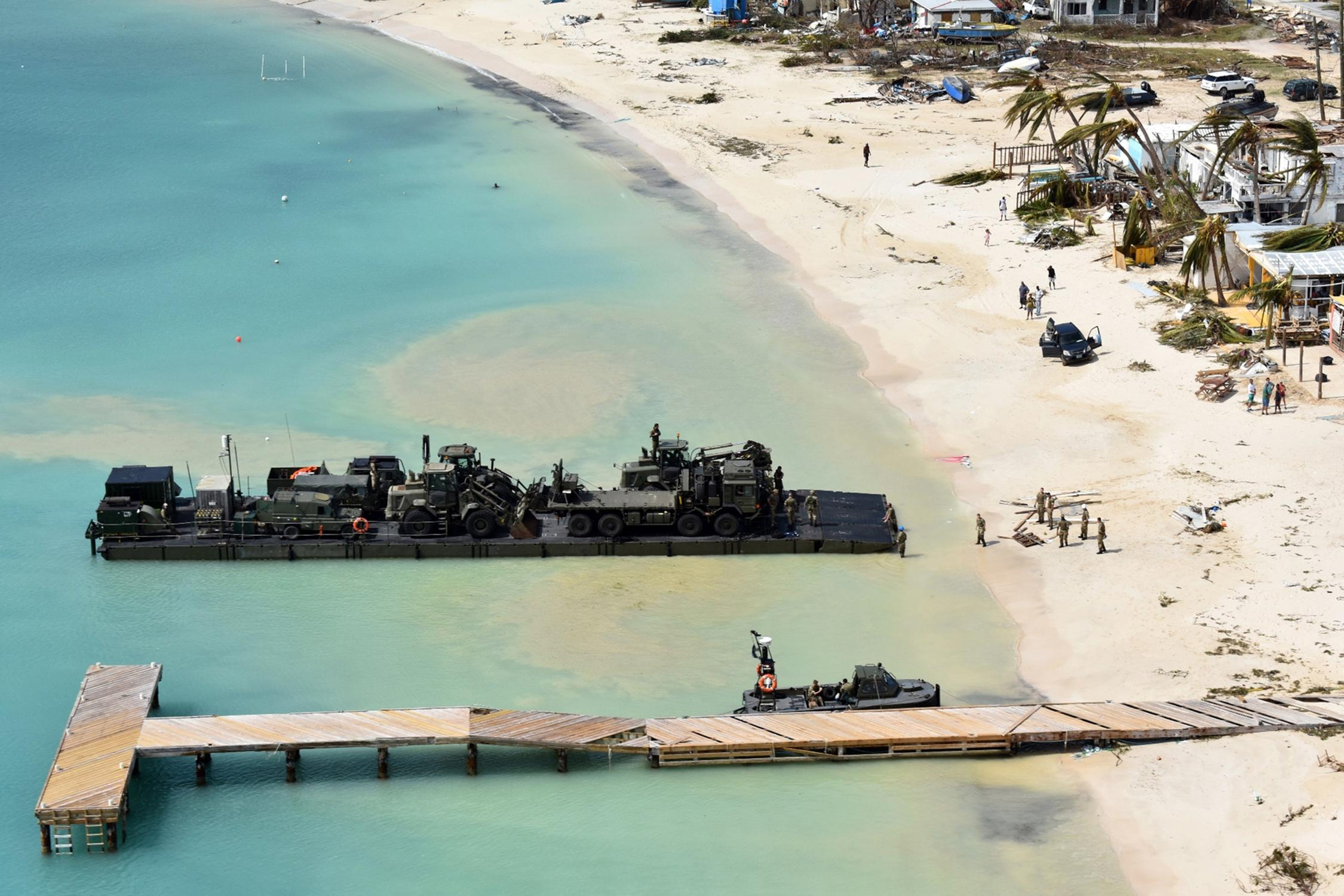
Royal Logistics Corps Mexeflote arrives in Anguilla

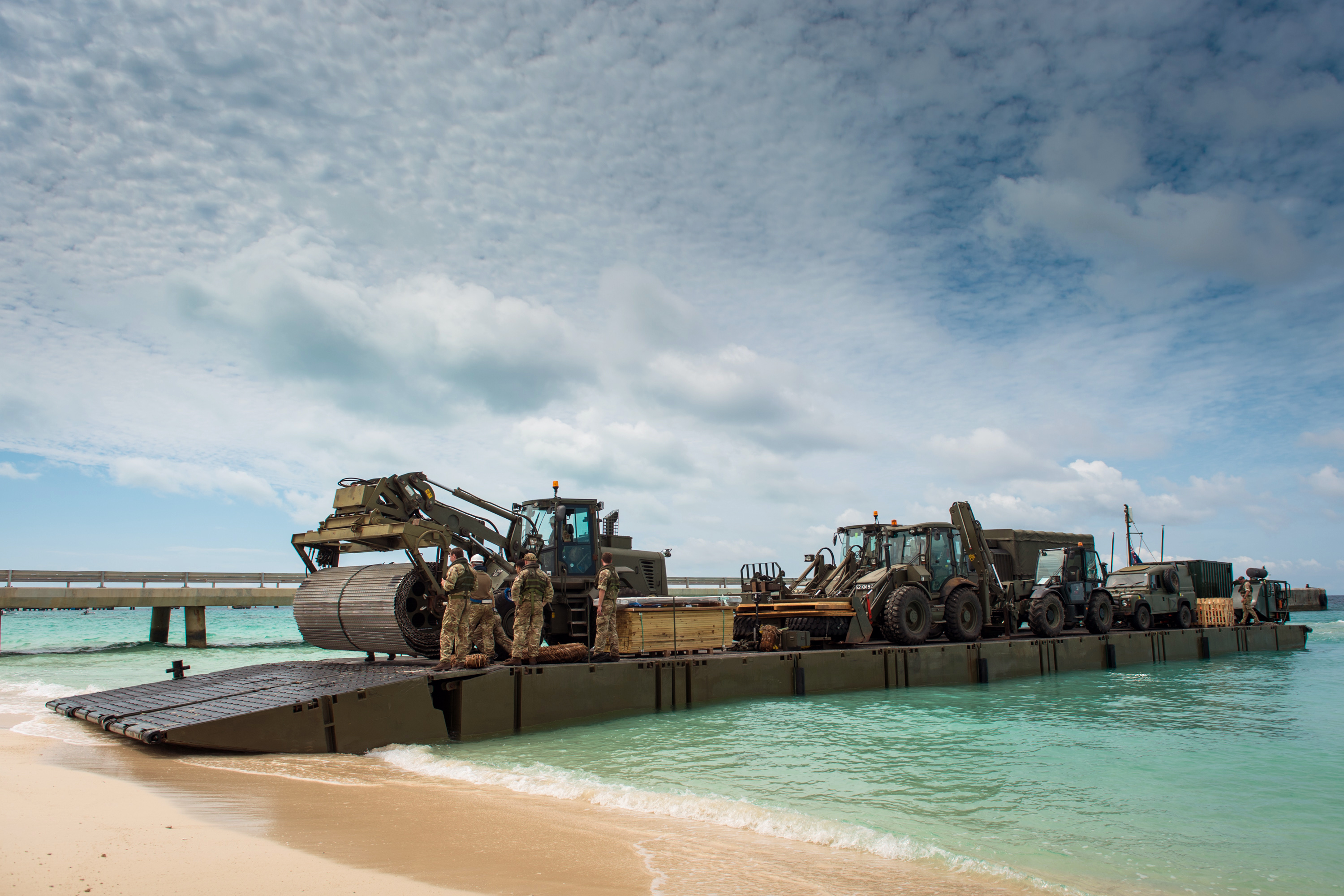
Mexeflote unloading on the beach at Grand Turk with heavy plant for use in the rebuild after the hurricane

== Design ==
Mexeflote is a powered raft (two diesel engines), used to move goods and vehicles between ship and shore when a pier is not available. The Mexeflote is designed in three sizes;

Type	Length	Width	Capacity	Ref
Standard size	20.12 m (66 ft 0 in)	7.32 m (24 ft 0 in)	60,000 kg (130,000 lb)	
Larger versions (Maxi-Mexeflote)	38.41 m (126 ft 0 in)	7.32 m (24 ft 0 in)	120,000 kg (260,000 lb)	
Larger versions (Maxi-Mexeflote)	38.41 m (126 ft 0 in)	12.2 m (40 ft 0 in)	180,000 kg (400,000 lb)	

Each version has three components; bow, stern, and centre, which can be fitted together as required, making the Mexeflote a versatile craft. The different sections allow it to be used as a raft, a floating pontoon, or as a causeway from ship to shore.

Mexeflote was the basis for the design of the Modular Elevated Causeway.
