= HMAS Choules =

Bay-class landing ship

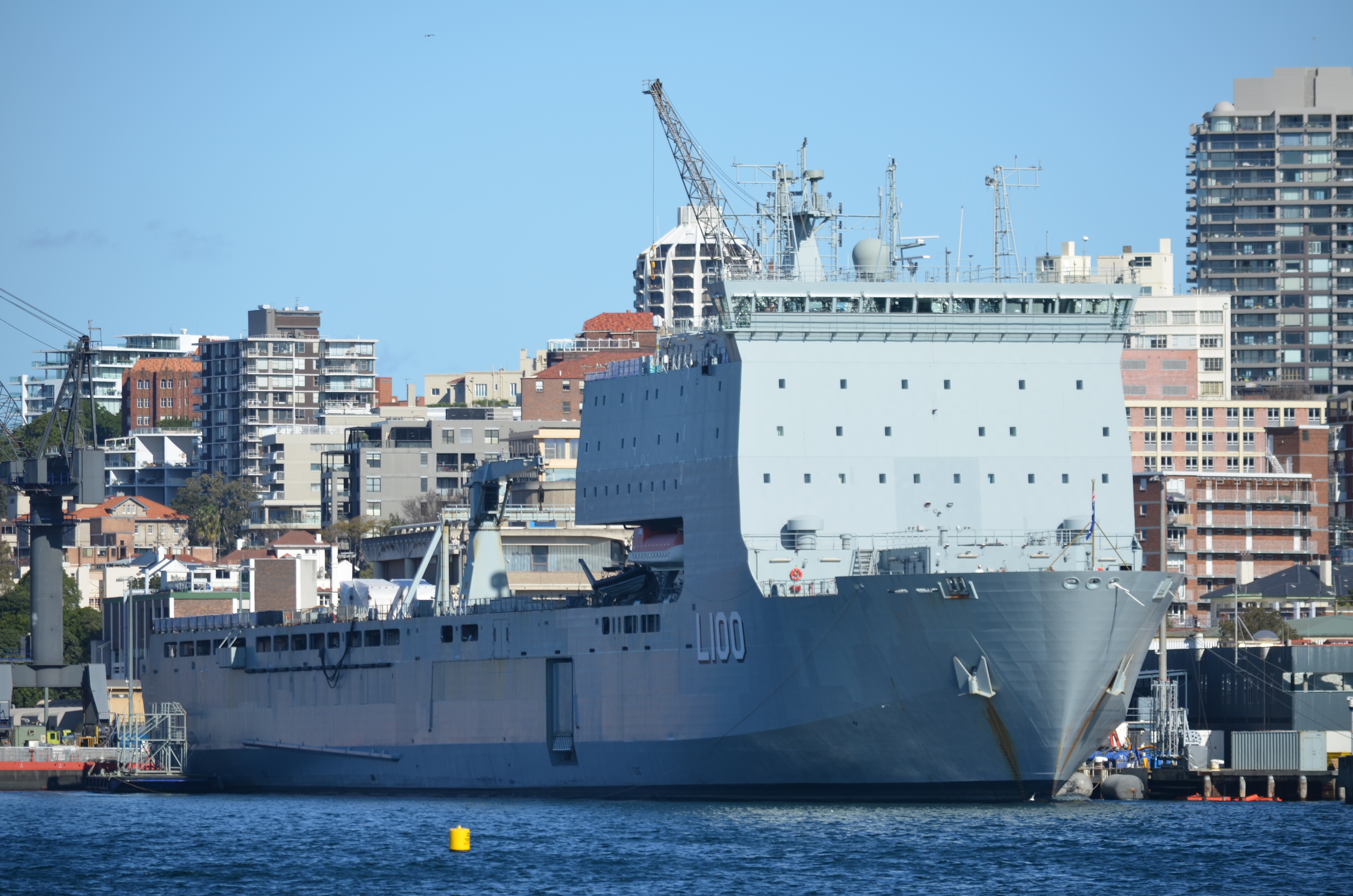
- HMAS Choules at Fleet Base East Sydney Harbour, Australia in August 2014

History

United Kingdom
- Name: Largs Bay
- Namesake: Largs Bay
- Ordered: 18 December 2000
- Builder: Swan Hunter, Wallsend, Tyne and Wear, England
- Laid down: 28 January 2002
- Launched: 18 July 2003
- In service: 28 November 2006
- Out of service: April 2011
- Identification: IMO number: 9240756; MMSI number: 232653000; Callsign: GCIA; Pennant number: L3006
- Fate: Decommissioned under SDSR, sold to Australia

Australia
- Name: Choules
- Namesake: Chief Petty Officer Claude Choules
- Acquired: 6 April 2011
- Commissioned: 13 December 2011
- Home port: Fleet Base East
- Identification: IMO number: 9240756; MMSI number: 503688000; Callsign: VKJC; Pennant number: L100
- Motto: "Face Difficulty With Zeal"
- Status: Active as of 2022
- Badge

General characteristics
- Class & type: Bay-class landing ship dock
- Displacement: 16,160 t (15,905 long tons) full load (RFA); 16,190 t (15,934 long tons) (RAN)
- Length: 579.4 ft (176.6 m)
- Beam: 86.6 ft (26.4 m)
- Draught: 19 ft (5.8 m)
- Propulsion: 2 × Wärtsilä 8L26 generators, 6,000 hp (4.5 MW); 2 × Wärtsilä 12V26 generators, 9,000 hp (6.7 MW); 2 × propulsion pods; 1 × bow thruster
- Speed: 18 knots (33 km/h; 21 mph)
- Range: 8,000 nmi (15,000 km; 9,200 mi) at 15 kn (28 km/h; 17 mph)
- Boats & landing craft carried: 1 LCU Mark 10, 1 LCM-8, or 2 LCVPs (Royal Marines version or RAN version); 2 Mexeflote powered rafts
- Capacity: 1,150 linear metres of vehicles (up to 24 Challenger 2 tanks, 32 M1A1 Abrams tanks, or 150 light trucks); Cargo capacity of 200 tons ammunition or 24 TEU containers
- Troops: 356 standard or 700 overload
- Complement: RFA: 60-70 core, increased for operational deployments; RAN - 158 fully crewed
- Sensors & processing systems: RAN service: EID ICCS integrated communications control system; CEAFAR-S multi-function radar
- Armament: RFA service; Fit to receive: Phalanx CIWS; 30 mm DS30B cannon; RAN service: 1 Phalanx CIWS; AN/SLQ-25 Nixie
- Aircraft carried: Blackhawk and Seahawk helicopters frequently embarked; flight deck can operate helicopters up to Chinook size
- Aviation facilities: No permanent hangar; temporary hangar can be fitted.

HMAS Choules (L100) is a Bay-class landing ship that served with the Royal Fleet Auxiliary (RFA) from 2006 to 2011, before being purchased by the Royal Australian Navy (RAN). The vessel was built as RFA Largs Bay by Swan Hunter in Wallsend, Tyne and Wear. She was named after Largs Bay in Ayrshire, Scotland, and entered service in November 2006. During her career with the RFA, Largs Bay served as the British ship assigned to patrol the Falkland Islands in 2008, and delivered relief supplies following the 2010 Haiti earthquake.

At the end of 2010, Largs Bay was marked as one of the vessels to be removed from service under the Strategic Defence and Security Review. She was offered for sale, with the RAN announced as the successful bidder in April 2011. After modifications to make her more suited for Australian operating conditions, the vessel was commissioned in December 2011 as HMAS Choules, named after Royal Navy and Royal Australian Navy Chief Petty Officer Claude Choules. A propulsion transformer failure kept the ship out of service between July 2012 and April 2013.

== Design and construction ==
The Bay class was designed as a replacement for the Round Table-class logistics ships operated by the RFA. The new design was based on the Royal Schelde Enforcer design; a joint project between the Dutch and Spanish resulting in the Rotterdam-class and Galicia-class amphibious warfare ships. The main difference with the British ships is the lack of a helicopter hangar. The ships were originally designated "auxiliary landing ship logistics" or ALSL, but this was changed in 2002 to "landing ship dock (auxiliary)" or LSD(A), better reflecting their operational role. Four ships were ordered; two from Swan Hunter, and two from BAE Systems Naval Ships.

The Bay-class ships have a full load displacement of 16,160 tonnes (15,900 long tons) in RFA service; this increased slightly to 16,190 tonnes (15,930 long tons) after modifications for RAN service. Largs Bay/Choules is 579.4 feet (176.6 m) long, with a beam of 86.6 feet (26.4 m), and a draught of 19 feet (5.8 m). Propulsion power is provided by two Wärtsilä 8L26 generators, providing 6,000 horsepower (4.5 MW), and two Wärtsilä 12V26 generators, providing 9,000 horsepower (6.7 MW). These are used to drive two steerable propulsion pods, with a bow thruster supplementing. Maximum speed is 18 knots (33 km/h; 21 mph), and the Bay-class ships can achieve a range of 8,000 nautical miles (15,000 km; 9,200 mi) at 15 knots (28 km/h; 17 mph). Largs Bay was fitted for but not with a Phalanx CIWS and a 30mm DS30B cannon when required for self defence. The RAN's webpage for Choules does not specify any armament. In British service, the everyday ship's company consisted of 60 to 70 RFA personnel, with this number supplemented by members of the British Armed Forces when Largs Bay was deployed operationally. The RAN opted to maintain the ship at full operational crewing at all times, with a ship's company of 158, including 22 Army and 6 RAAF personnel.

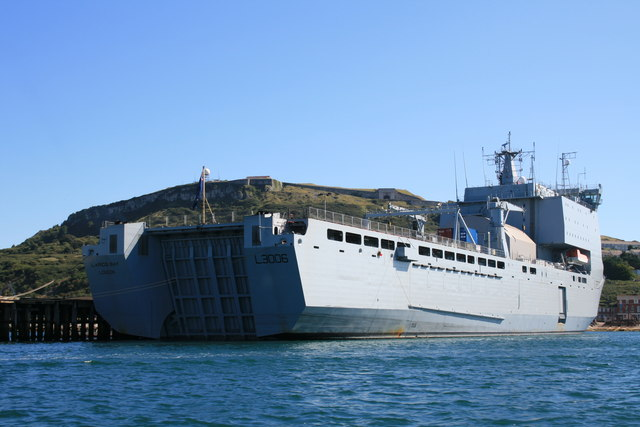
RFA Largs Bay in Portland Harbour, August 2009

As a sealift ship, Largs Bay is capable of carrying up to 1,150 linear metres of vehicles; equivalent to 24 Challenger 2 tanks, 32 M1A1 Abrams tanks, or 150 light trucks. The cargo capacity is equivalent of 200 tons of ammunition, or 24 twenty-foot equivalent unit containers. During normal conditions, a Bay-class ship can carry 356 soldiers, but this can be almost doubled to 700 in overload conditions. The ship does not have permanent hangar facilities. However, a temporary hangar may be fitted and in Australian service the twin-spot flight deck has been extensively utilized with the embarkation of Blackhawk, MRH-90 and Seahawk helicopters. In the period one year prior to April 2014 the ship had clocked up 1,000 deck landings. The flight deck is capable of accommodating helicopters up to the size of a Chinook heavy-lift helicopter. The well dock can carry one LCU Mark 10, one LCM-8, or two LCVPs (either the Royal Marines version or the Royal Australian Navy version), and two Mexeflotes can be suspended from the ship's flanks. The LCM-1E landing craft being acquired by the RAN will not fit into the dock. Two 30-ton cranes are fitted between the superstructure and the flight deck.

Largs Bay and sister ship Lyme Bay were ordered from Swan Hunter on 18 December 2000. Largs Bay was laid down at Swan Hunter's shipyard at Wallsend, Tyne and Wear on 28 January 2002; the first ship of the class work started on. The ship was launched on 18 July 2003. The ship was completed and accepted by the Ministry of Defence in April 2006, over a year late. Largs Bay was dedicated on 28 November 2006, the second of the class to enter service with the RFA. The Bay-class construction project saw major delays and cost overruns, particularly in the Swan Hunter half of the project. Shortly after Largs Bay was handed over, Swan Hunter was stripped from the project, with BAE taking full responsibility for the class and Lyme Bay towed to BAE's shipyard in Govan for completion in June 2006.

== Operational history ==
=== United Kingdom ===
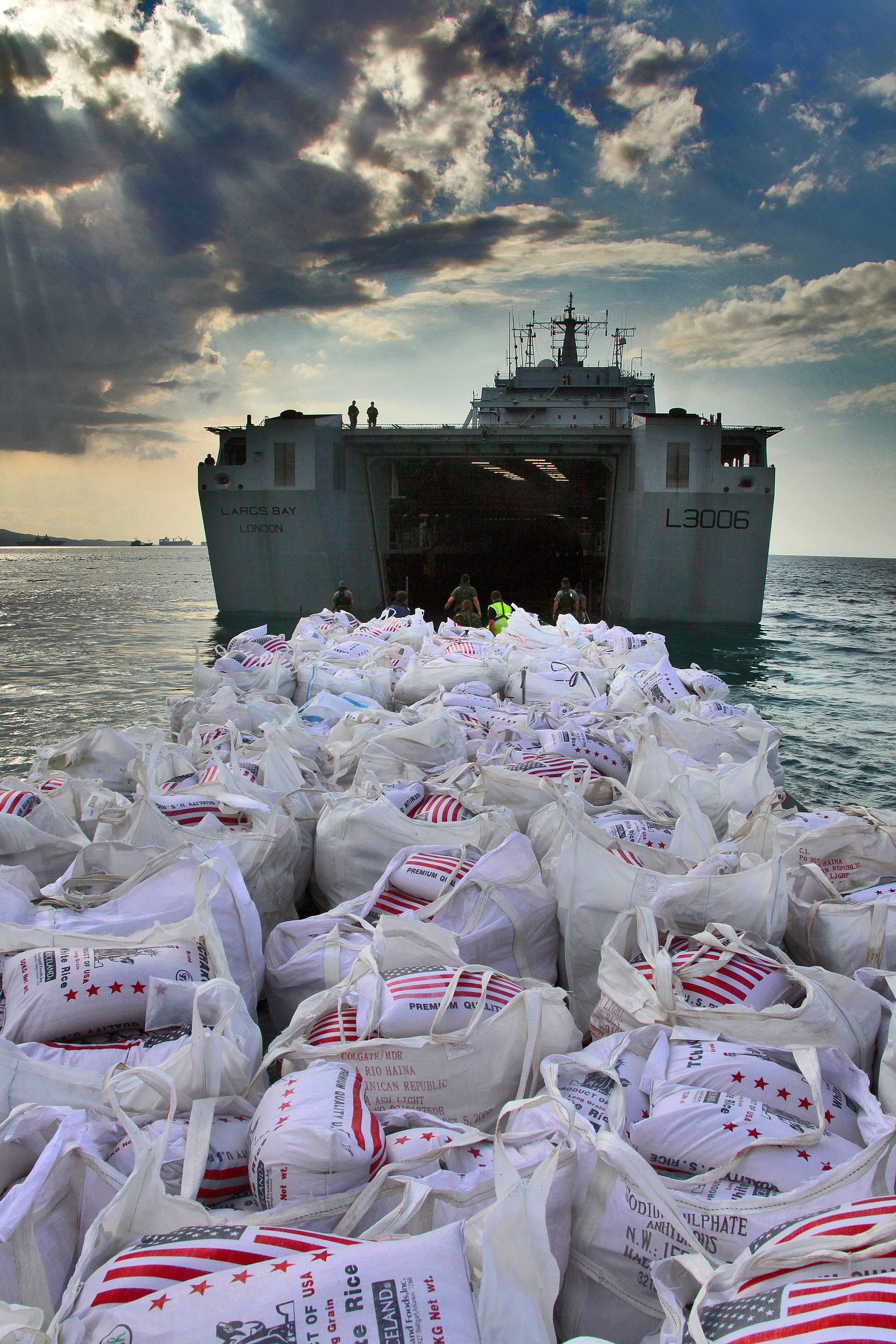
Humanitarian supplies being unloaded from Largs Bay in Haiti

Four months after entering service, an engine room fire resulted in steering and propulsion issues, requiring Largs Bay to be towed to Plymouth for repairs. In late November 2007, Largs Bay embarked 815 Naval Air Squadron 215 Flight and left home waters for the Caribbean to conduct counter-drug operations. She visited eleven islands including Barbados, Curaçao, Grand Turk, Martinique, Trinidad and also the USA. Three days after leaving Barbados Largs Bay's patrolling helicopter spotted a small fishing vessel stopped in the water and detained her after a pursuit; 575 kilograms (1,268 lb) of cocaine were recovered, with an estimated £20 million European street value. She participated in Navy Days while in port at Curaçao, where several hundred people toured her.

In late 2008, it was reported that Largs Bay was to replace HMS Northumberland for duties in the Falkland Islands. Northumberland was to have left for the Islands in December 2008, but was instead sent for pirate patrol off Somalia.

In early 2010, Largs Bay was deployed to the Arctic Circle. Following the 2010 Haiti earthquake, the ship was pulled from exercises and sailed on 3 February to deliver a load of relief supplies to Haiti. On 18 February 2010, she arrived at Port-au-Prince and unloaded 430 tonnes (470 tons) of supplies plus 165 tonnes (182 tons) of rations, while engineers from the ship began work on restoring electricity ashore. On 30 March 2010, she returned home. Largs Bay's actions were recognised in December 2011 with the awarding of the Firmin Sword of Peace.

In August 2010, the ship participated in the Bournemouth Air Festival.

=== Decommissioning and transfer ===
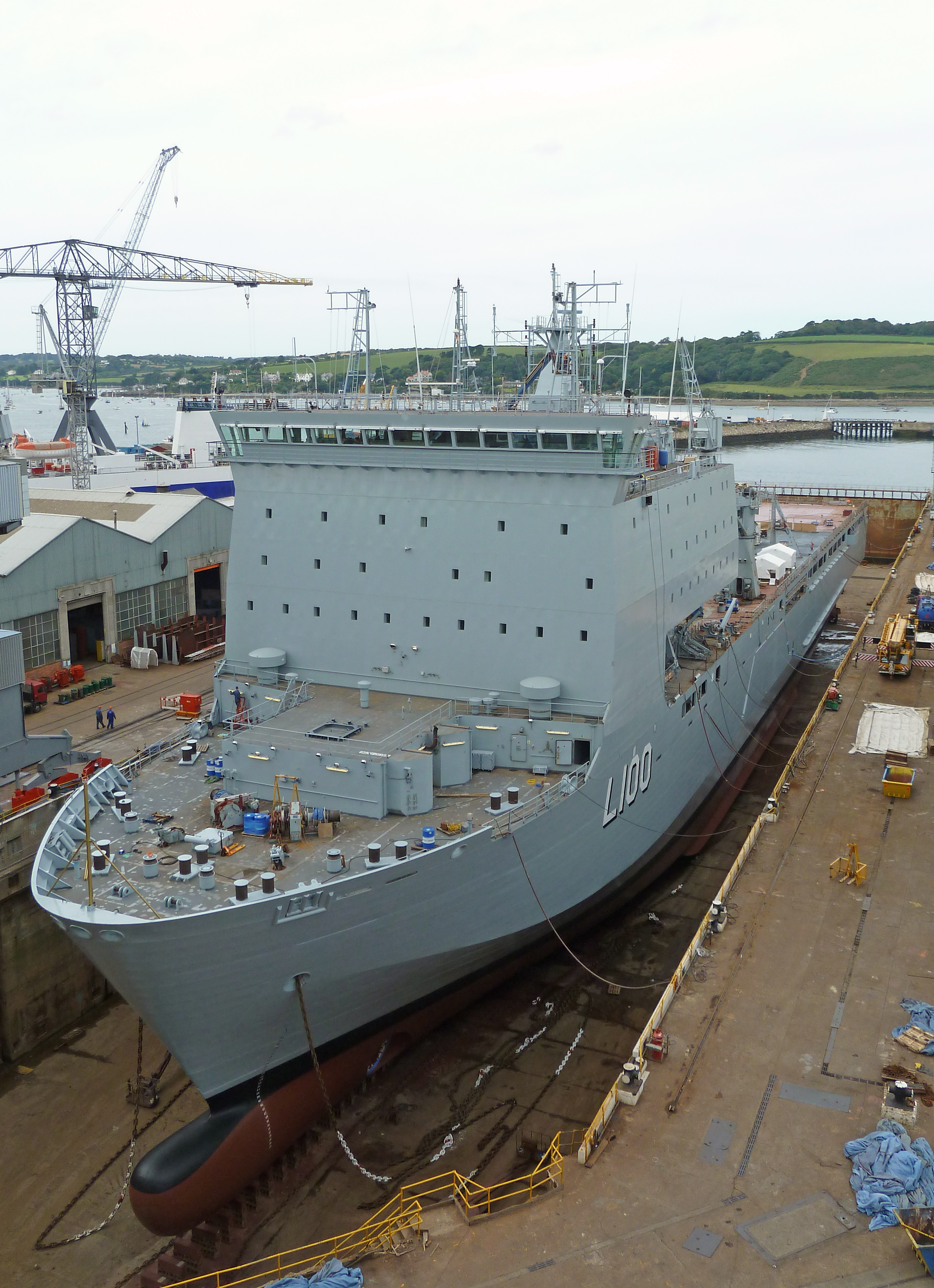
Largs Bay in Falmouth Docks during August 2011. Note that her new RAN pennant number has been painted on her hull.

In December 2010, it was announced that the ship would be decommissioned in April 2011 as part of the Strategic Defence and Security Review. Shortly after marking Largs Bay for disposal, the British Ministry of Defence contacted the Chilean government and suggested the vessel as a potential replacement for the landing ship tank vessel Valdivia, which was due to leave service. In January 2011, the Australian Department of Defence announced that it was interested in purchasing the vessel for the RAN as a replacement for the heavy landing ship HMAS Tobruk or one of the Kanimbla-class amphibious warfare ships. Interest in the ship was also shown by Brazil and India.

On 17 March 2011, the Australian Department of Defence announced that the RAN would be bidding for Largs Bay; this was followed on 6 April by news that a £65 million (A$100 million) bid had been successful. Sea trials during April showed that the ship was in good condition, although she would have to be modified before entering Australian service, particularly to allow operation in tropical conditions. During a 16-week docking at the A&P Group shipyard in Falmouth, the modifications were made, along with refit work to maintain the ship's Lloyds certification. The RAN also acquired two Mexeflote landing rafts for use with the ship.

On 13 August, it was announced that Largs Bay would be renamed HMAS Choules when commissioned into the RAN. The name comes from Chief Petty Officer Claude Choules, who served in both the Royal Navy and the RAN during his career, and was the last known living participant in World War I. Choules is the second RAN vessel to be named after an enlisted sailor, following the submarine HMAS Sheean. The ship was assigned the pennant number L100, reflecting the 100th anniversary of the RAN's origin in 2011. Her motto is "Face Difficulty With Zeal".

On 14 October, the vessel was handed over to the RAN. She arrived in Fremantle, Western Australia on 10 December, and was commissioned into the RAN on 13 December. Choules entered full operational service in early 2012, and is based at Fleet Base East.

=== Australia ===
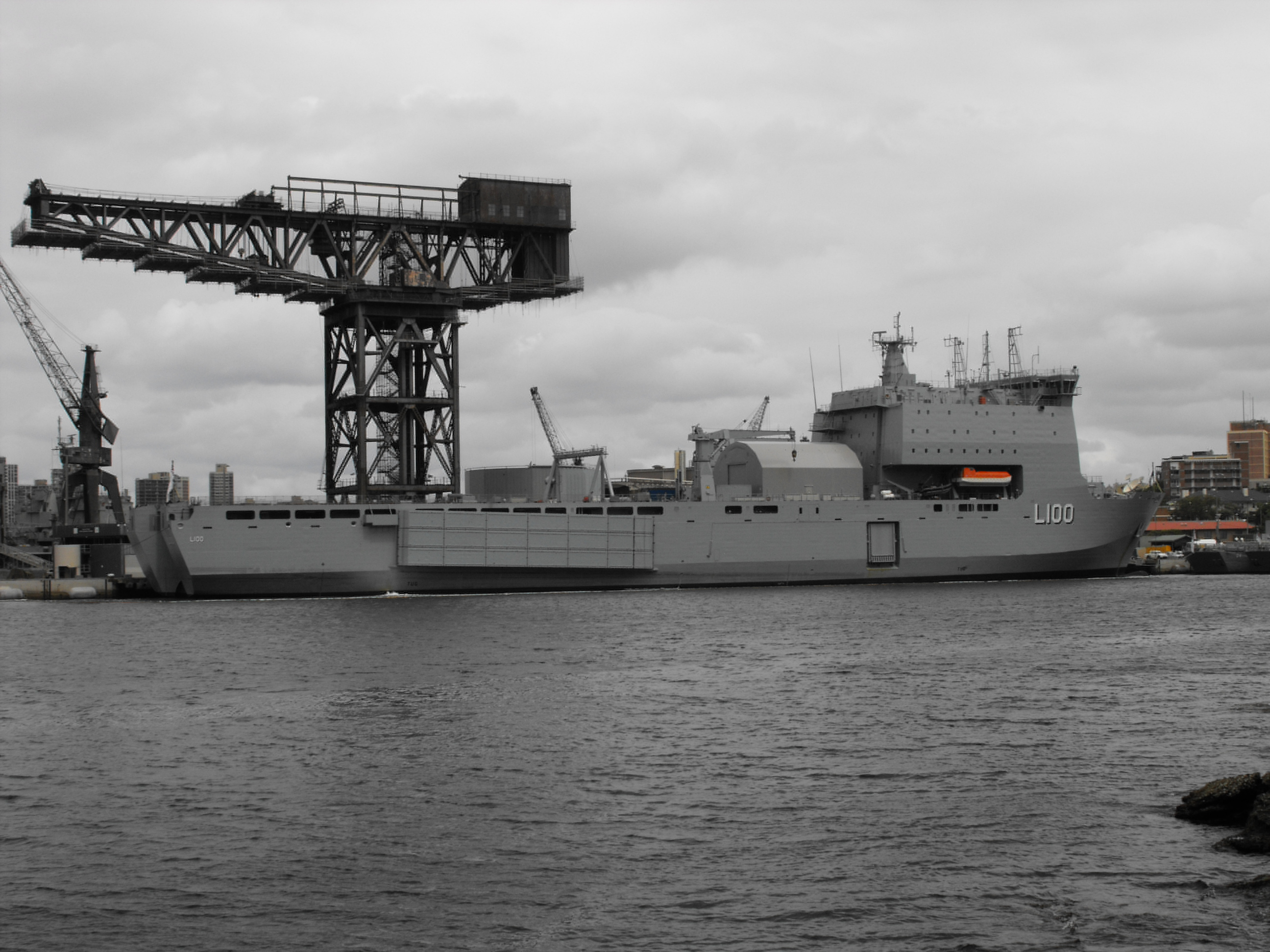
HMAS Choules at Fleet Base East in January 2012. The ship's temporary hangar structure is visible behind the superstructure.

On 24 February 2012, Choules arrived in Townsville. This was in preparation for a month of amphibious warfare training exercises with the Australian Army's 3rd Brigade.

In June 2012, one of the two main electrical transformers involved in the ship's propulsion system failed, after an earlier engineers report highlighted "overheating of the propulsion motors and transformers". Inspection found that insulation failure had short-circuited the transformer, while other transformers aboard showed premature wear. Unable to find an available spare, a new unit had to be ordered from the manufacturer. In June, it was predicted that Choules would be out of service for four to five months, but by October, claims were made that the ship would be inoperable until at least January 2013, and if all of the wear-showing transformers were replaced, she would not return to service until April 2013. By December, the faulty transformer had been replaced, and the RAN had decided that although the other transformers (propulsion and others) had been shown to have acceptable levels of wear, all would be replaced before Choules was reactivated. These repairs were completed in early 2013, and the ship was assessed as ready to re-enter service on 12 April.

For a short time from July 2013, Choules was anchored offshore of the Manus Regional Processing Centre in Papua New Guinea to provide temporary accommodation for Department of Immigration and other personnel, due to a lack of accommodation at the centre. In April 2015, the ship transported 46 Vietnamese asylum seekers back to Vũng Tàu, after their vessel was intercepted at sea on 20 March by Australian border protection units and their claims were rejected after interviews at sea lasting less than 40 minutes.

Choules' operational role was reevaluated after the Canberra-class landing helicopter dock ships entered service in 2016, but will likely be kept on to fill the role of the strategic sealift ship envisioned by the 2009 Defence white paper.

In March 2017 Choules was sent to Queensland to support recovery after Cyclone Debbie.

Choules was deployed to Vanuatu on 30 September 2017 to aid in the rescue of 11,000 people from a volcanic eruption of Monaro Voui.

In January 2020, Choules was deployed to the coastal town of Mallacoota in East Gippsland, Victoria, to evacuate thousands of people trapped by bushfires and to ferry them south to Hastings in Western Port Bay.

On 14 February 2021, HMAS Choules left Australia for Papua New Guinea with 5 Isuzu fire trucks donated by Queensland Fire and Emergency Services.

On 11 March 2021, Gippsland officially announced Mallacoota as the new ceremonial homeport for HMAS Choules.

Choules underwent a major refit between 2020 - 2021 as part of SEA3030-2 Capability Assurance Project, Mid-Life Upgrade (CAP) by A&P Australia.

In May 2022 it was announced that Choules would be eventually replaced by one of two sought 'Joint Support Ships' under Project Sea 2200.

In early 2024 it was revealed that Choules had been fitted with a new CEA Technologies radar.
