= Wallsend =

Town in North Tyneside, England

Coordinates: 54.991°N 1.534°W

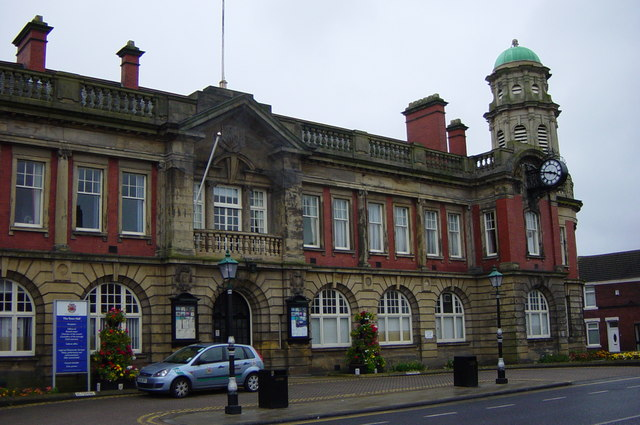
- Wallsend Town Hall

- Location within Tyne and Wear
- Population: 43,826
- OS grid reference: NZ301664
- Metropolitan borough: North Tyneside
- Metropolitan county: Tyne and Wear
- Region: North East
- Country: England
- Sovereign state: United Kingdom
- Post town: WALLSEND
- Postcode district: NE28
- Dialling code: 0191
- Police: Northumbria
- Fire: Tyne and Wear
- Ambulance: North East
- UK Parliament: Newcastle upon Tyne East and Wallsend

Wallsend (/ˌwɔːlzˈɛnd/) is a town in North Tyneside, Tyne and Wear, England, at the eastern end of Hadrian's Wall. It has a population of 43,842 and lies four miles (6.5 kilometres) east of Newcastle upon Tyne.

== History ==
=== Roman Wallsend ===
In Roman times, this was the site of the fort of Segedunum. This fort protected the eastern end of Hadrian's Wall, which did not terminate at the western wall of the fort, but continued from its south-eastern corner down to the shore of the River Tyne. As David Breeze writes, "In the early nineteenth century, as recorded by Bruce, John Buddle the Younger had often seen the Wall foundations extending far into the river when swimming there as a boy."

=== Pre-Conquest ===
The withdrawal of the Romans from the Wall immediately brought the Picts from the north and shortly afterwards the Angles, sailing from near the mouth of the River Elbe with frequent raids both from sea and from land. Ida the Saxon laid waste to the whole of the north in 547 and Wallsend doubtless suffered in the general devastation. It was not until the golden age of Northumberland under Edwin of Northumbria, and the subsequent introduction of the Christian faith by King Oswald of Northumbria (635–642) and St Aidan, that Wallsend enjoyed a time of peace and progress. This time of peace came to an abrupt end in 794 when the Danes (or Vikings) swarmed up the Tyne in great numbers. In the years before the Norman Conquest, there was a struggle for mastery between Danes and Angles.

=== 19th century to present ===
Several urban sanitary districts were formed in the parish in the late 19th century: Willington Quay, Howdon and Wallsend itself. The first two joined to form the Willington Quay urban district under the Local Government Act 1894, with the portion of the parish outside any urban sanitary district forming the parish of Willington in Tynemouth Rural District. Wallsend was incorporated as a municipal borough in 1901, and in 1910 took over Willington Quay and Willington, and also part of the parish of Longbenton. St Peter's Church, Wallsend (Church of England) has four fine stained glass windows by Michael Healy of An Túr Gloine: St Patrick, St Peter and St Luke (1913); Our Lord with the Nativity and the Shepherds (1919); Angel of the Resurrection with St George and St Christopher (1921); Our Lord walking on water (1921); and a window by Ethel Rhind, also of An Túr Gloine, depicting The Good Shepherd, Mary of Bethany, David (1921).

=== Shipbuilding ===
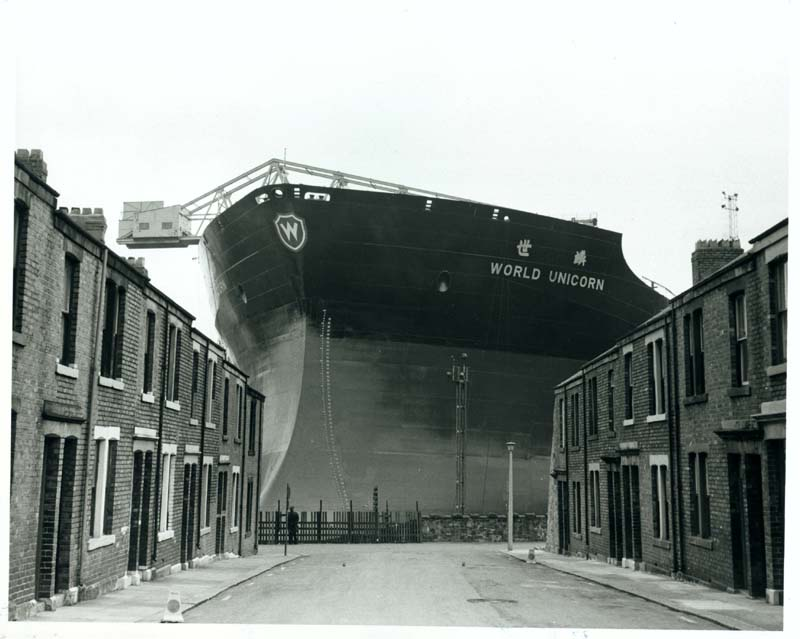
World Unicorn being built by Swan Hunter at the Wallsend shipyard in 1973

Wallsend has a history of shipbuilding and was the home of the Wigham Richardson shipyard, which later amalgamated to form Swan Hunter & Wigham Richardson, probably best known for building the RMS Mauretania. This express liner held the Blue Riband, for the fastest crossing of the Atlantic, for 22 years.

Other famous ships included the RMS Carpathia which rescued the survivors from the Titanic in 1912, and the icebreaker Krasin (launched as Sviatogor) which rescued the Umberto Nobile expedition on Spitzbergen in 1928, when Roald Amundsen perished. The story is retold in the movie The Red Tent, starring Sean Connery and Peter Finch.

Charles Parsons launched his revolutionary Turbinia here in 1894, thus not only revolutionising the navies of the world, but also, through the large-scale production of affordable electricity, making a significant contribution to the modern age. He features in a BBC film called The Inventor of the Twentieth Century.

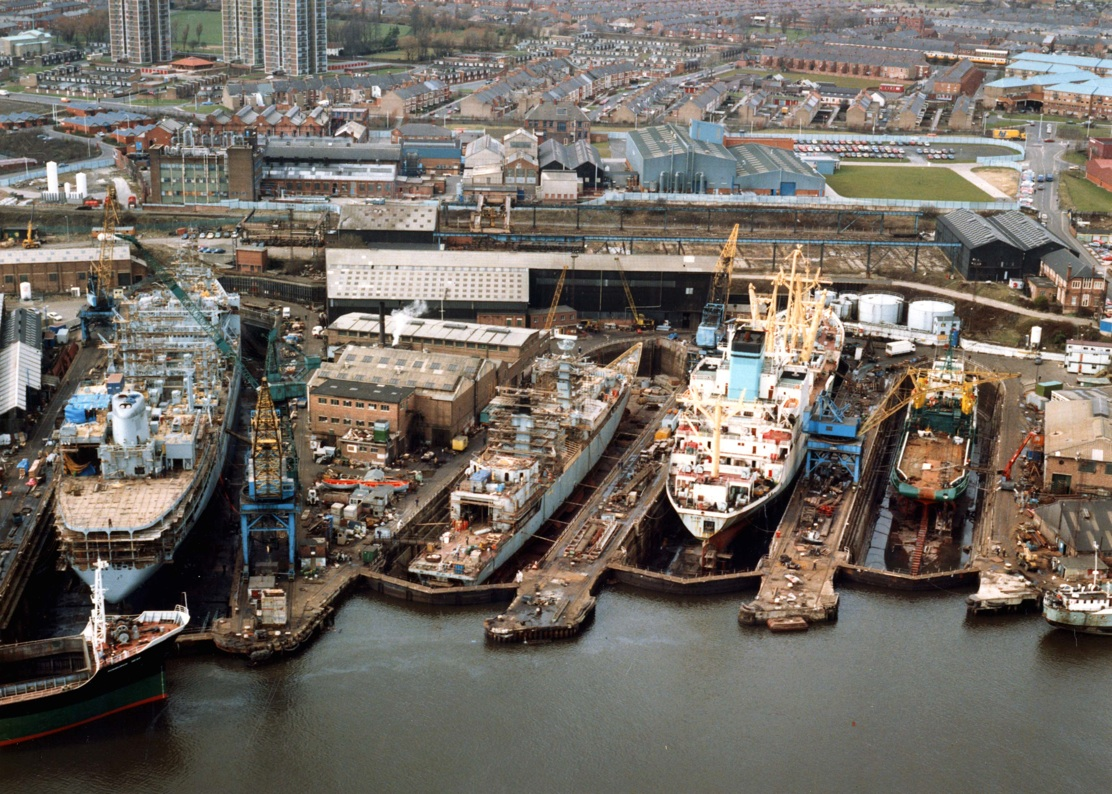
Wallsend ship repair dry docks, 1987

Russian novelist Yevgeny Zamyatin worked at Swan Hunter in 1916–17, and used it as background for his great anti-utopian work We which was a major influence on George Orwell's Nineteen Eighty-Four.

World War II ships built here include HMS Sheffield and HMS Victorious which took part in the sinking of the Bismarck. Other ships built there include the new HMS Ark Royal in the 1980s.

The shipyard closed in 2007. The musical The Last Ship by Sting is set in the shipyard. The former Wallsend Slipway & Engineering Company Shipyard continues to operate, constructing offshore oil rigs and as a TV studio: productions from there include the hit ITV drama Vera starring Brenda Blethyn and Inspector George Gently starring Martin Shaw.

=== Coal mining ===
Much of Wallsend's early industry was driven by coal mining. The Wallsend Colliery consisted of seven pits which were active between 1778 and 1935. In the 1820s the pits became incorporated as Russell's Colliery, which then became the Wallsend and Hebburn Coal Company Ltd. By 1924 the colliery employed 2,183 people. Its most prominent manager was mining and railway engineer John Buddle who helped develop the Davy Lamp.

Between 1767 and 1925, there were 11 major incidents recorded at the colliery resulting in over 209 deaths. In 1821, a gas explosion resulted in 52 deaths. On 18 June 1835, a gas explosion in one of the tunnels killed 102 miners, the youngest of whom was aged eight and the oldest 75. Many of the dead were found with their cloth caps in their mouths. This is believed to have been an attempt to prevent inhalation of the gas which eventually killed them. The bodies were extracted and buried in St Peter's churchyard at the top of the bank overlooking the Wallsend Burn. A plaque has been erected within the churchyard to commemorate this tragedy.

In 1969, the Rising Sun Colliery in Wallsend was closed. It was the last Tyneside colliery on the north bank of the river.

=== Twentieth century ===
The town has expanded greatly in terms of housing since the end of World War II, and since the 1960s. Wallsend Town Centre—including the main shopping area known as the "Wallsend Forum"—is in fact to the west of the land covered by the town. To the north of this area lies the older estate of High Farm and the new estate of Hadrian Lodge. The town centre of Wallsend is separated from the eastern areas of the town by the Wallsend Burn, a stream running through a small glacial valley from north-west to south-east and through the Willington Gut into the River Tyne. To the east of the Burn is the old area of Holy Cross, which contains the ruins of a medieval church, the pre-war estate of Rosehill and the mainly post-war estate of Howdon. To the south of Howdon lies Willington Quay which, as its name suggests, once served shipping but which is now dominated by industry and housing. East Howdon forms a small enclave between Willington Quay and North Shields.

The town's principal thoroughfare and shopping street is the High Street. To the north of this street is Wallsend Green, the town's most picturesque area, consisting of large houses as well as the Sir G B Hunter Memorial Hospital, surrounding a green square. Behind the Green, where the Burn runs through the parkland of the Hall Grounds lies Richardson Dees Park, a traditional British municipal park, whose restoration has frequently been demanded by local residents and is planned with many improvements such as a skate and BMX park, better pathways, and a rebuilding of the Duffy Memorial Fountain. On Rheydt Avenue in Wallsend is Centurion Park Golf Club, previously named Wallsend Golf Club. It has 18 holes and a driving range.

Wallsend also has a rugby club which is situtated in Battle Hill. The team is named Wallsend RFC and has over 200 players. Wallsend RFC has been in Wallsend for 175 years. Wallsend's rugby team brings key support to the community and helps sport in Wallsend thrive.

The town is home to Wallsend Boys Club, which has produced many famous football players such as Alan Shearer, Lee Clark, Steve Watson, Peter Beardsley, Robbie Elliott, Mick Tait and Michael Carrick. It is also hometown and birthplace to internationally successful musician Sting, whose song All This Time refers to the Roman wall and fort. The musical The Last Ship, composed and written by Sting, is set in Wallsend.

Wallsend Town Hall, a large Edwardian Baroque style building in High Street East, was completed in 1908.

=== Commemorating Roman history ===
In dedication to its Roman heritage, Wallsend's historic name Segedunum is shown in many places in the town, and signs with Latin wordings can also be found. Wallsend Metro Station has some signs in English and Latin. Such translations tend to amuse, with contrasts between today's and ancient times. Segedunum Roman Fort Museum has displays on Roman history as well as reconstructions of a bath house and a section of the Roman Wall which once stood on the site.

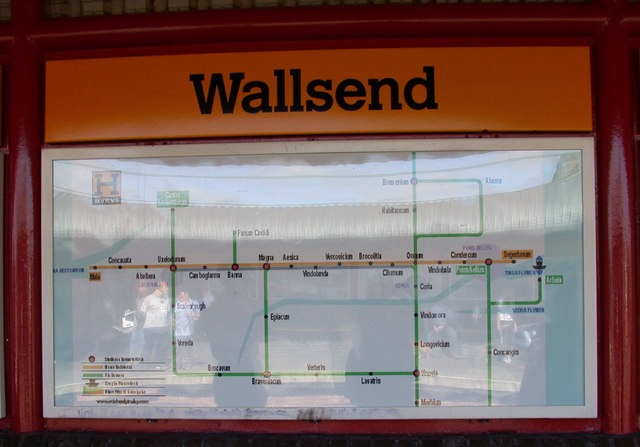
A Hadrian's Wall map imitating the style of a Metro map

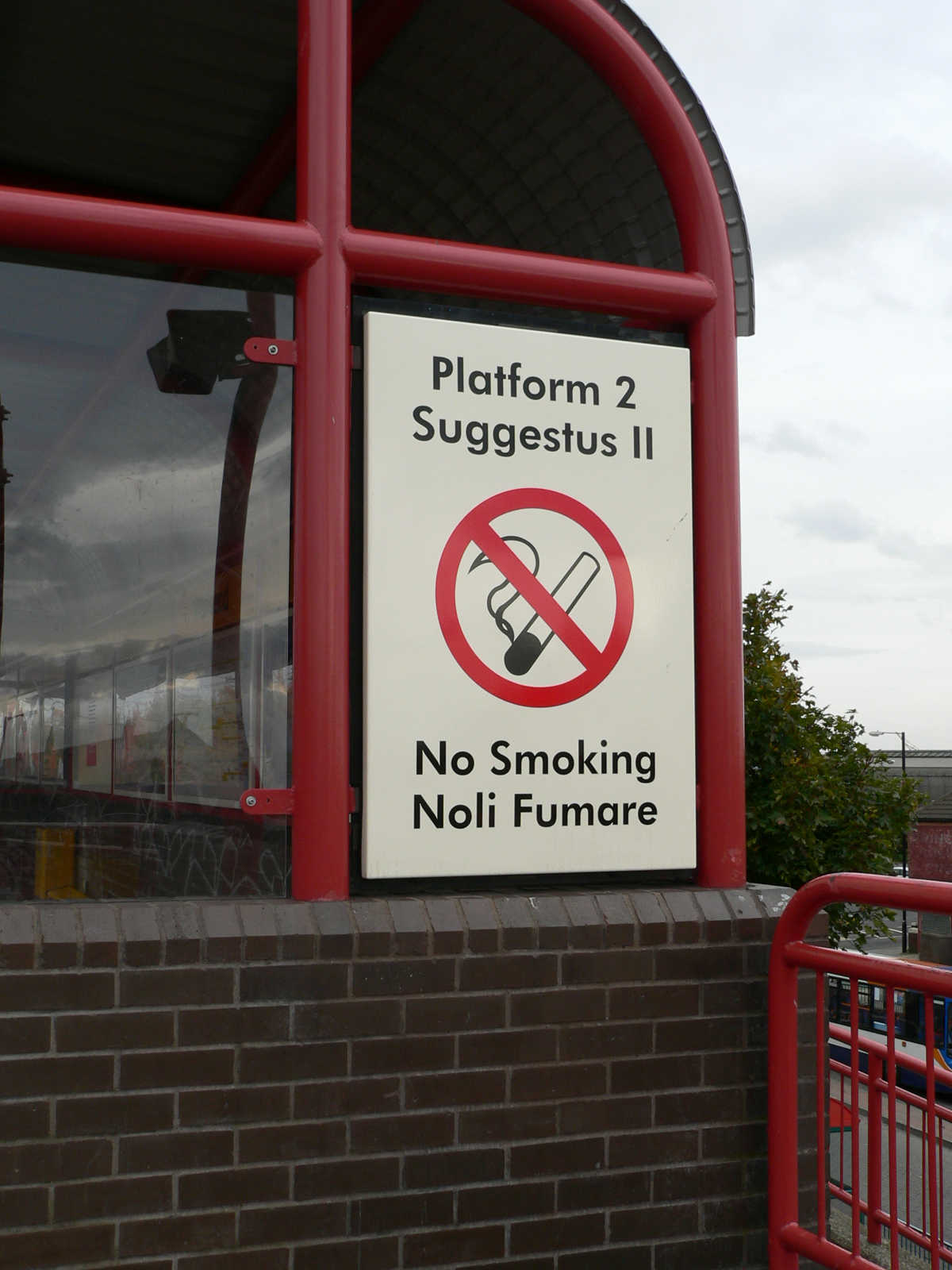
Bilingual, English–Latin station platform and no smoking sign

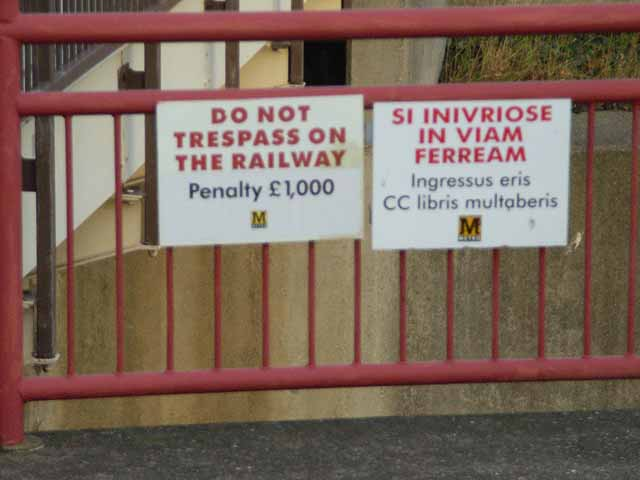
No trespassing signs, in English and Latin with different penalties (£200 in the Latin)

== Geography ==
Wallsend is on the Bank of the River Tyne and one of its tributaries flows through Wallsend known as the Wallsend Burn.

== Demography ==
In 2011, Wallsend had a population of 43,826, compared with 42,842 in the previous census.

	Wallsend	North Tyneside
White British	95.1%	95.1%
Asian	1.9%	1.9%
Black	0.6%	0.4%

In Wallsend, 4.9% of the population is non-white British, which is the same as the surrounding borough. It also has the same percentage of Asian people, but has slightly more black people. Wallsend is the second least ethnically diverse major urban subdivision in Tyneside and has a larger percentage of white British people compared with Tynemouth which is also slightly larger in population. However it has more ethnic minorities than Jarrow, which is south of the river Tyne.

== Notable people ==
- Paul W. S. Anderson – filmmaker
- Andrea Riseborough – actress
- Sheldon Hall – film historian
- Peter Higgs – theoretical physicist, winner of the Nobel Prize in Physics
- Paul Kennedy – historian
- Andrew Leslie – shipbuilder
- John Anthony McGuckin – theologian, Orthodox Archpriest
- Vicky Pattison – reality TV star
- Charlie Hardwick – actress
- Danny Murphy – actor
- Janet McTeer – actress

=== Politics ===
- John McKay – MP for Wallsend 1945–1964
- Chi Onwurah – MP for Newcastle Upon Tyne Central 2010 to present
- T. Dan Smith – regional politician

=== Music ===
- Richard Gaddes – opera administrator
- Ray Jackson – musician
- Ochre – musician
- Venom – band
- Sting – musician

=== Football – players, managers, coaches ===
- Steve Bruce
- Brian Laws
- Michael Carrick
- George Reay
- Lee Clark
- Neil McDonald
- Tony Lowery
- Steve Watson
- Paul Stephenson
- Michael Smith
- Barry Richardson

=== Other sports players ===
- Billy Bolt – motorcycle rider, FIM SuperEnduro World Championship winner
- Kevin McDine – darts player
- Chris Thorman – Rugby
- Gary Wilson – snooker player

== See also ==
- Point Pleasant
- North East England

== Sources ==
- Atkinson, Frank (1979). The Great Northern Coalfield 1700-1900. Newcastle upon Tyne: Frank Graham. ISBN 0 85983 121 3.
