= USS Chief =

USS Chief has been the name of three ships in the United States Navy.

- USS Chief (AMc-67), was renamed Bold on 23 May 1941.
- USS Chief (AM-315), was an Auk-class minesweeper which served from 1943 until 1955.
- USS Chief (MCM-14), is an Avenger-class mine countermeasures ship commissioned on 5 November 1994.
