= USS Warrior =

1990 Avenger-class mine countermeasures ship

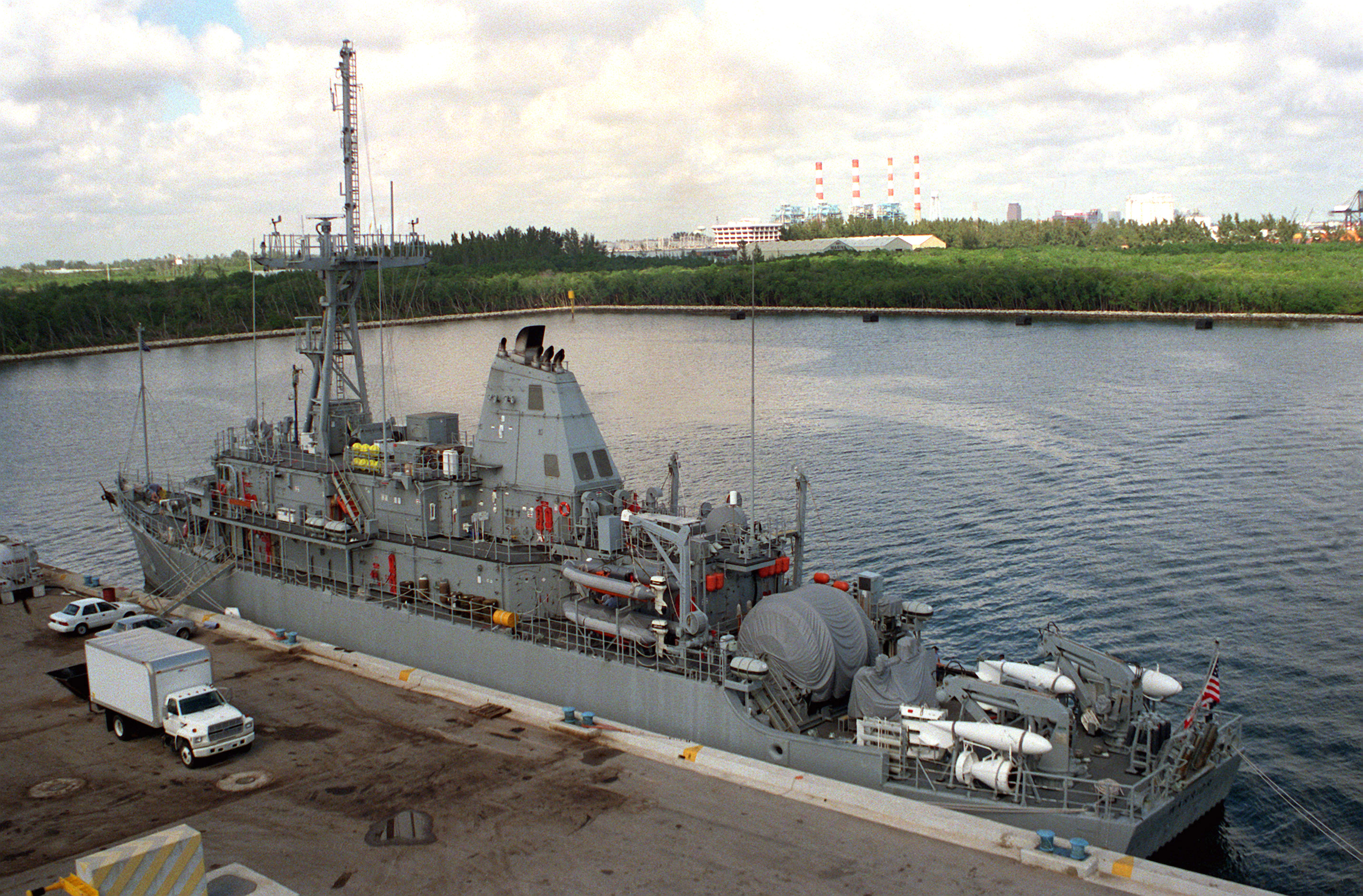
- USS Warrior (MCM-10)

History

United States
- Name: USS Warrior
- Builder: Peterson Builders, Sturgeon Bay, Wis.
- Laid down: 15 September 1989
- Launched: 8 December 1990
- Acquired: 30 December 1992
- Commissioned: 3 April 1993
- Home port: Sasebo, Japan
- Identification: MCM-10
- Motto: Full Speed Ahead
- Status: in active service
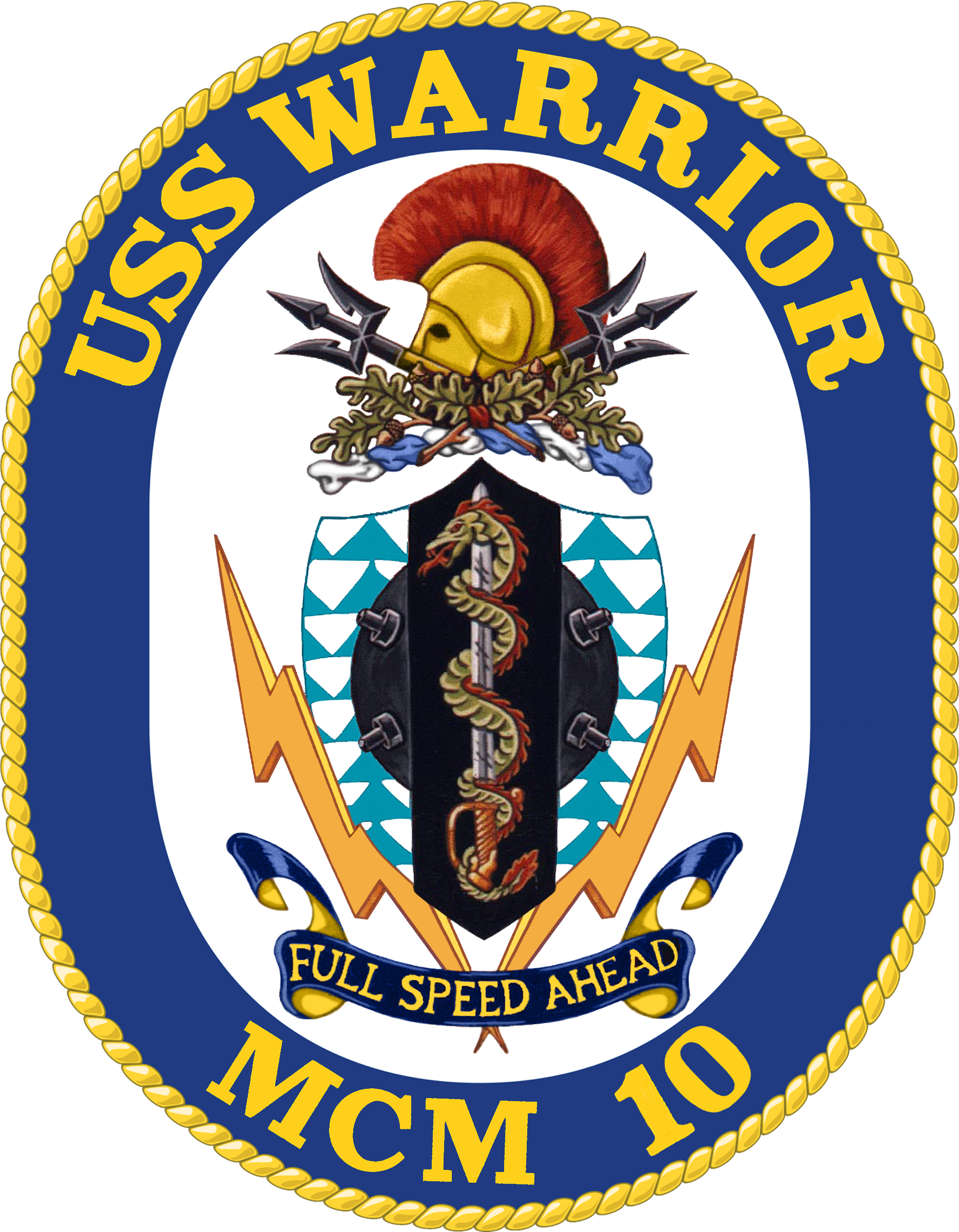
- Badge

General characteristics
- Class & type: Avenger-class mine countermeasures ship
- Displacement: 1,253 tons (light); 1,367 tons (full)
- Length: 224 ft (68 m)
- Beam: 39 ft (12 m)
- Draft: 15 ft (4.6 m)
- Propulsion: 4 × Isotta Fraschini diesel engines (600 BHP each), 2 × controllable reversible pitch propellers, 2 × rudders, 2 × electric light load propulsion motors
- Speed: 13.5 knots (25.0 km/h; 15.5 mph)
- Complement: 6 officers, 75 enlisted
- Armament: 2 × M2HB .50 caliber machine guns, 2 × M60 machine guns, 2 × Mk 19 grenade launchers
- Notes: Except for the engines and other equipment, Warrior's hull is made entirely of wood.

USS Warrior (MCM-10) is an Avenger-class mine countermeasures ship of the United States Navy.

The Avenger-class ships were designed to have very low acoustic and magnetic signatures to avoid detonating mines. While most modern warships have steel hulls, the Avengers have wooden hulls with an external coating of fiberglass. They are equipped with sophisticated minehunting and classification sonar as well as remotely operated mine neutralization and disposal systems.

== Service history ==
Warrior was laid down on 25 September 1989 at Peterson Builders in Sturgeon Bay, Wisconsin. She was launched on 8 December 1990, and was commissioned on 3 April 1993.

On 7 August 1998, Warrior rescued four men from a sinking boat off the coast of Charleston, South Carolina. "We were in the right place at the right time," said Chief Boatswain's Mate (SW) John Valdez.

In June 2005, Warrior, along with four other mine countermeasure ships, participated in a mine warfare exercise off the coast of Florida. The other ships involved were Gladiator, Shrike, Oriole and Cormorant.

On 26 February 2013, 7th Fleet announced that Warrior would be transferred from 5th Fleet in Bahrain to 7th Fleet in Sasebo, Japan to replace Guardian, which had recently been decommissioned after running aground in the Philippines.

== Awards and accomplishments ==
- Won the 2004 Safety Excellence Award in the Mine Warfare Ship category
- Reported no personnel injured or dead or property damages during training exercises and scheduled deployment tasks
- Won Award Battle E for excellence in 1995, 2001, 2003, 2005, 2017, 2019, and 2025.
- Won the Marjorie Sterrett Battleship Fund Award in 2025.
- Received Meritorious Unit Commendation for action in Exercise BLUE HARRIER, 1995

== See also ==
- Current United States Navy ships
- List of mine warfare vessels of the United States Navy
