= USS Ardent (MCM-12) =

US Navy mine countermeasures ship

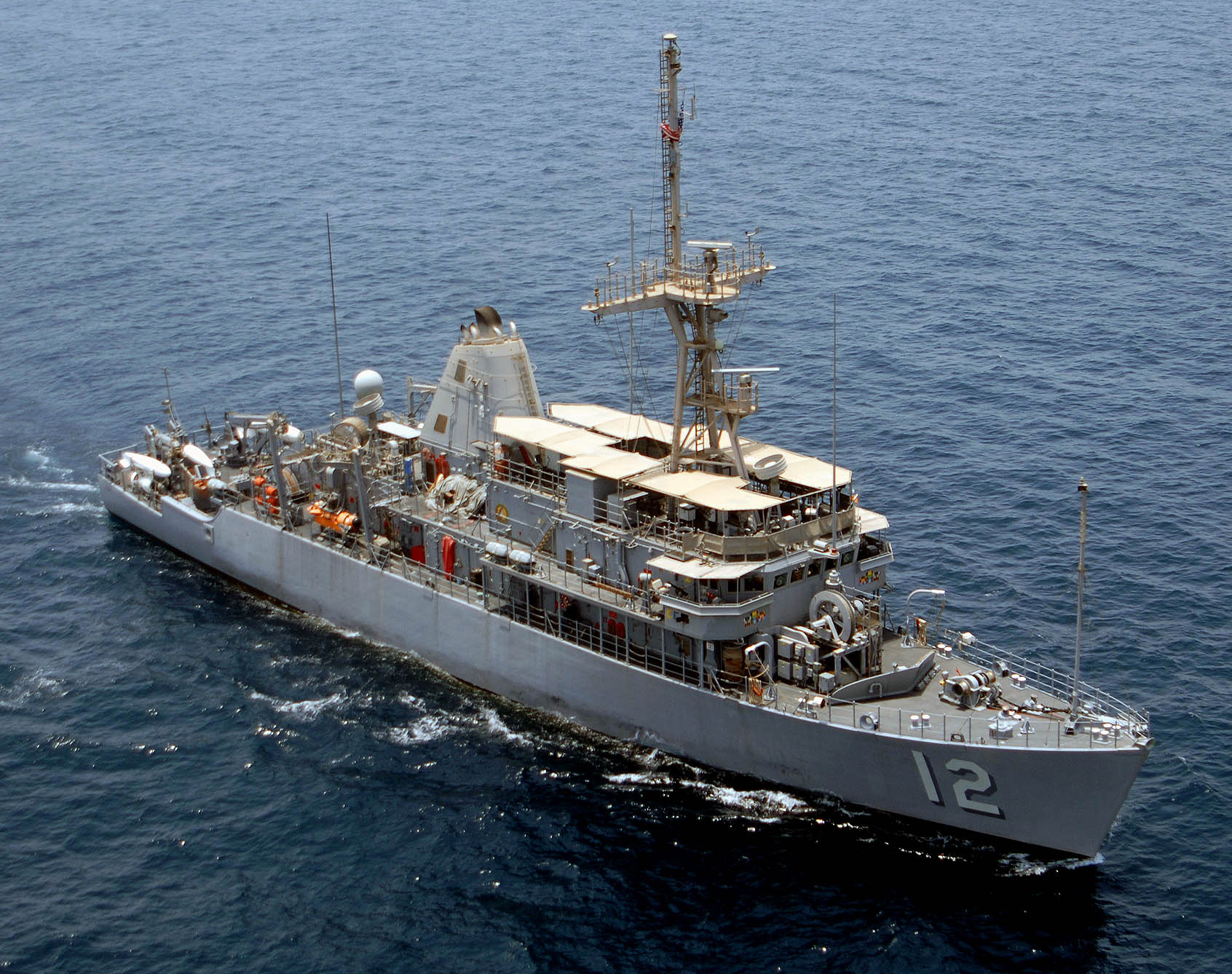
- USS Ardent at sea in the Persian Gulf, July 2005

History

United States
- Name: Ardent
- Ordered: 12 December 1989
- Laid down: 22 October 1990
- Launched: 16 November 1991
- Christened: 20 August 1993
- Commissioned: 18 February 1994
- Decommissioned: 27 August 2020
- Home port: San Diego, California
- Status: Decommissioned
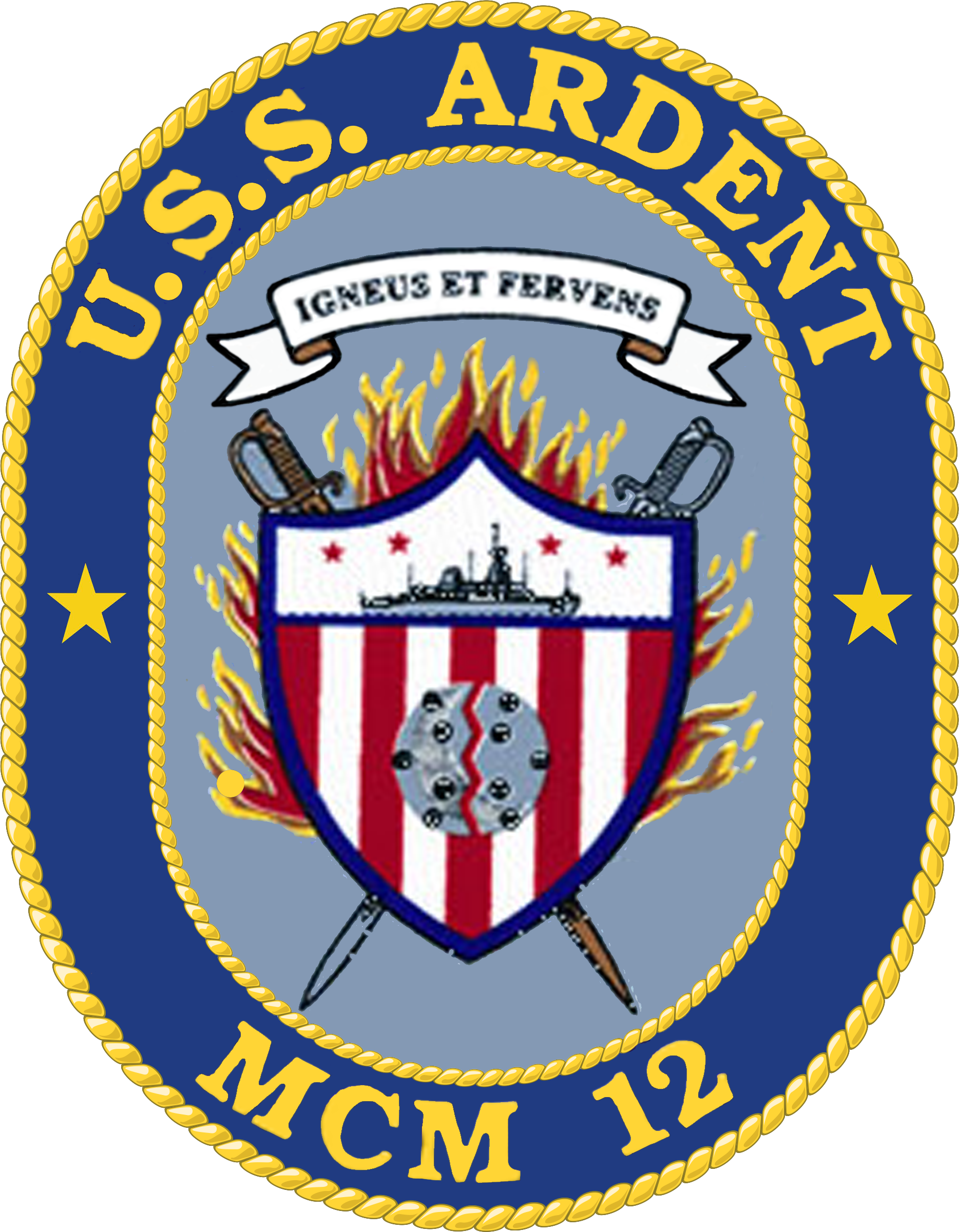
- Badge

General characteristics
- Class & type: Avenger-class mine countermeasures ship
- Displacement: 1,312 tons
- Length: 224 ft (68 m)
- Beam: 39 ft (12 m)
- Draft: 11.5 ft (3.5 m)
- Propulsion: four diesels
- Speed: 14 knots (26 km/h)
- Complement: 8 Officers, 6 Chief Petty Officers and 58 Enlisted
- Armament: Mine neutralization system, two .50 cal (12.7 mm) machine guns

USS Ardent (MCM-12) was an Avenger-class mine countermeasures ship in the United States Navy.

She was built by Peterson Shipbuilders, Sturgeon Bay, Wisconsin. Ardent was homeported at San Diego, California and was part of the U.S. 3rd Fleet.

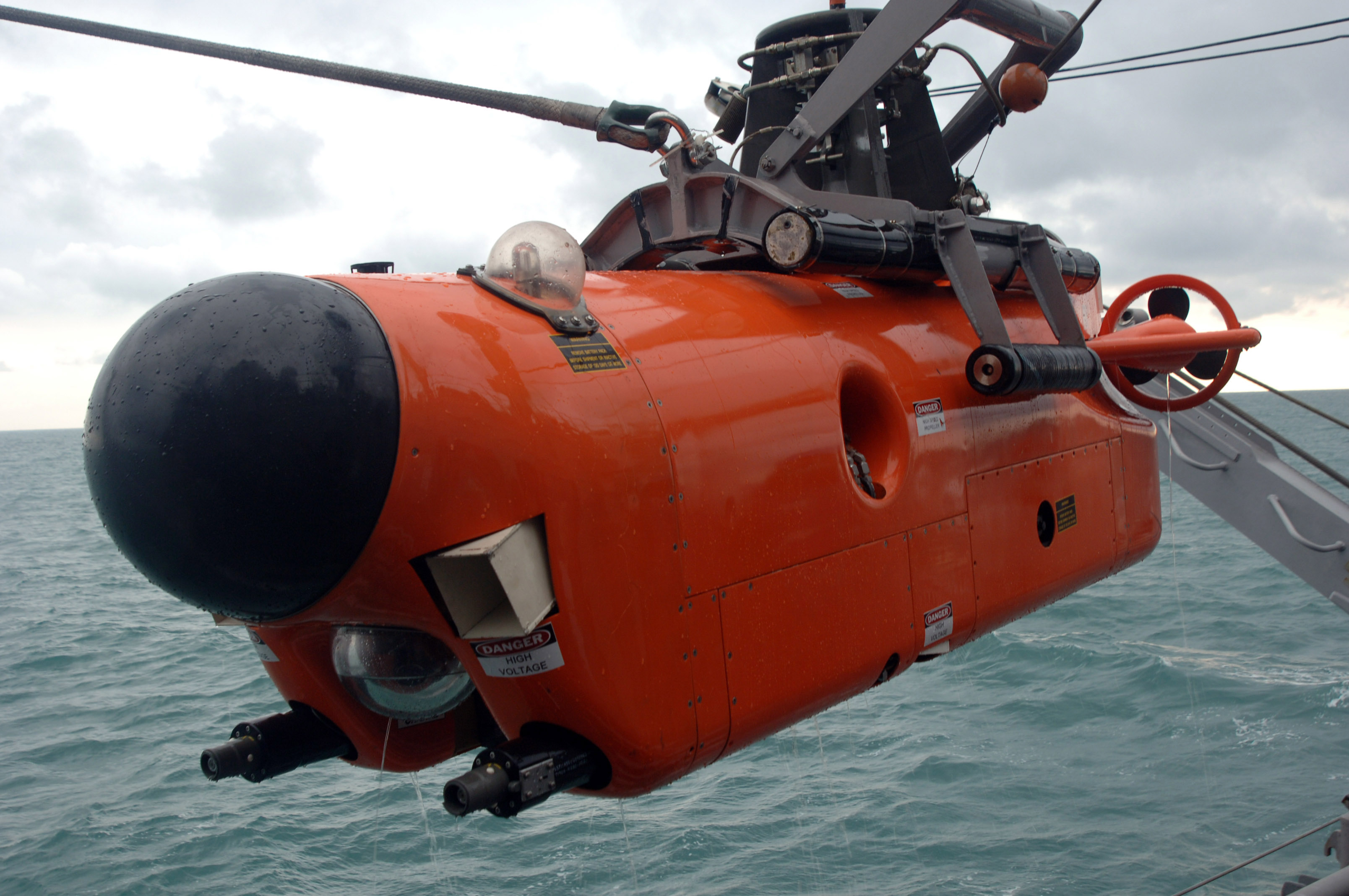
AN/SLQ-48 MNS (Mine Neutralization System) in use aboard Ardent. This remotely operated underwater vehicle (ROV) is controlled through an umbilical cable, has low acoustic and magnetic signature, and is equipped with low-light television (LLTV) cameras, allowing it to get close to mines to place destructive charges or cut their mooring lines without triggering them.

Her Command History for 1993-94 indicates that '.. on 1 November 1994 a reorganization of the U.S. Navy's Mine Countermeasures Community took place. Commander, Mine Warfare Command ceased to be Type Commander for the ships homeported in Ingleside, Texas; and a new entity, Naval Surface Group Ingleside, was created to serve as local agent for the new Type Commander, Commander, Naval Surface Force Atlantic. NSG Ingleside was also intended to give the Ingleside ships "cradle to grave" assistance and supervision. In the new organization, ARDENT was assigned to Mine Countermeasures Squadron 3 (MCMRON 3). ARDENT remained in MCMRON 3 through the end of 1994.

Ardent was featured in a front-page article in the 31 July 2006 edition of DefenceNews that pointed out that Ardent and USS Dextrous were suffering from equipment failures that made them unable to perform their role.

Ardent held a decommissioning ceremony at Naval Base San Diego on 17 August 2020 and was officially decommissioned on 27th of the same month.
