= USS Sentry (MCM-3) =

1986 Avenger-class mine countermeasures ship

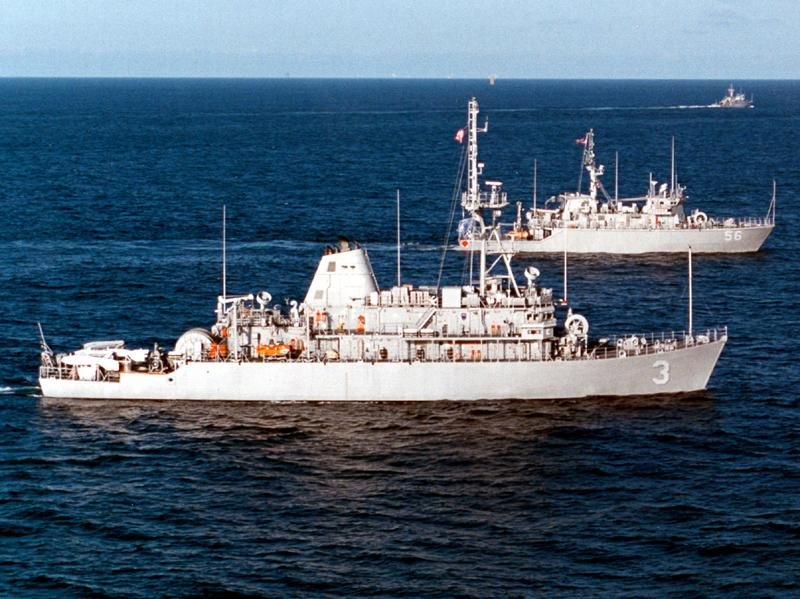
- Sentry (front) and USS Kingfisher

History

United States
- Name: USS Sentry
- Awarded: 23 December 1983
- Builder: Peterson Shipbuilders
- Laid down: 8 October 1984
- Launched: 20 September 1986
- Commissioned: 2 September 1989
- Decommissioned: 24 September 2025
- Home port: Bahrain
- Motto: "Iron men in wooden ships."
- Nickname(s): The Sentinel of the Sea
- Status: Decommissioned
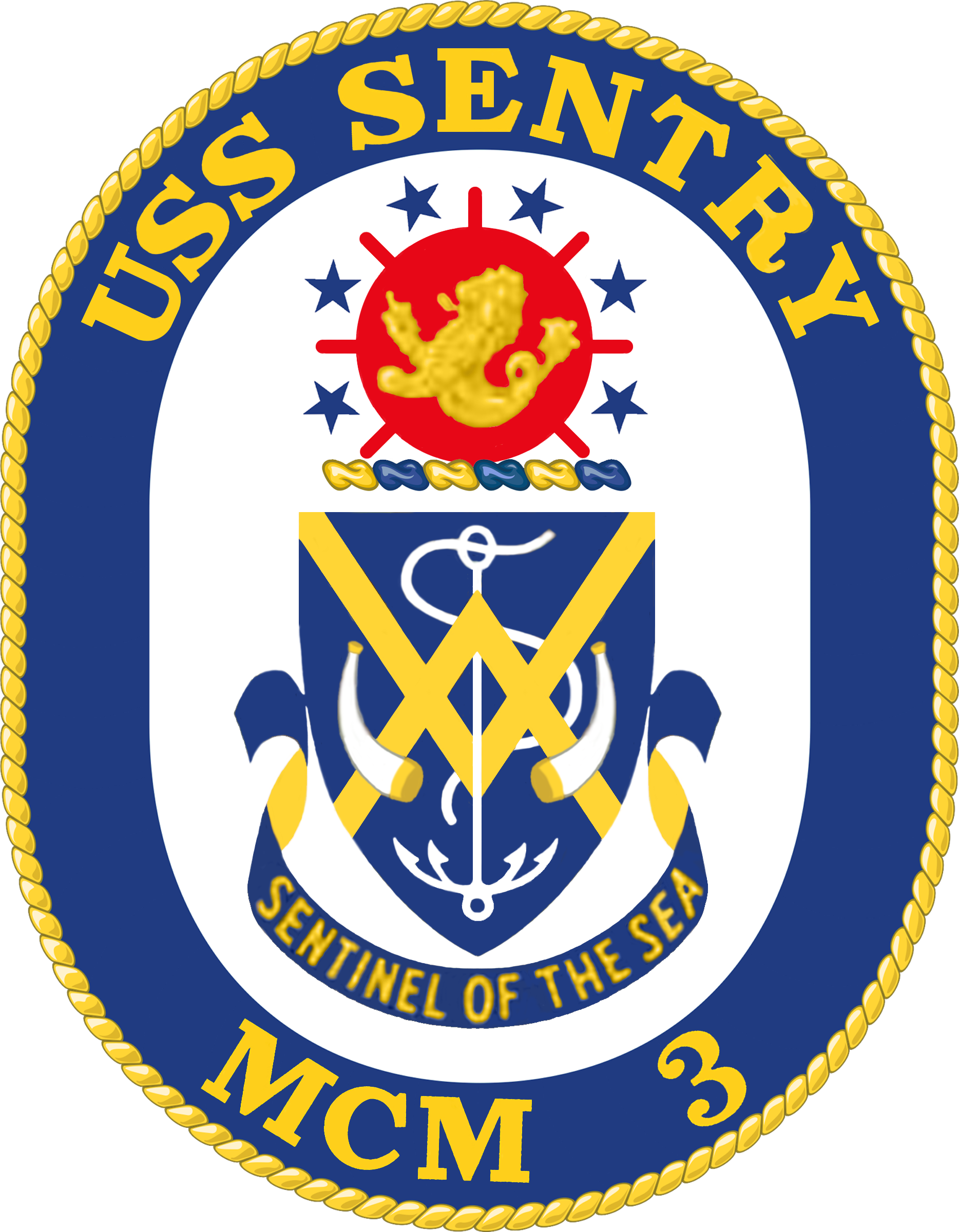
- Badge

General characteristics
- Class & type: Avenger-class mine countermeasures ship
- Displacement: 1,367 tons (1,390 t)
- Length: 224 ft (68 m) overall
- Beam: 39 ft (12 m)
- Draft: 13 ft (4.0 m)
- Installed power: 3 x Isotta Franchini Co. diesel engines, 375 KW Each
- Propulsion: 4 × Isotta Franchini Co. diesel engines, 2 × controllable pitch propellers, 2 × rudders, 2 × light-load electric motors
- Speed: 14 knots (26 km/h; 16 mph)
- Boats & landing craft carried: 2 RHIB
- Capacity: 81
- Complement: 6 officers, 75 enlisted
- Sensors & processing systems: MCM suite: AN/SLQ-48 Mine Neutralization System, AN/SQL-37(V)3 Magnetic/Acoustic Influence Minesweeping Gear, Oropesa type 0 size 1 Mechanical Sweep Equipment, MDG 1701 Marconi Magnetometer Degaussing System; Electronics: AN/SSN-2 Precise Integrated Navigation System (PINS), AN/SQQ-32 Mine Hunting Sonar, AN/SPS-55 Surface Radar, AN/WSN-7 Gyro Compass
- Armament: 2 × M2HB .50-cal machine guns, 2 × M60 7.62 mm machine guns, 2 × Mk 19 grenade launchers

USS Sentry (MCM-3), an Avenger-class mine countermeasures ship, is the second U.S. Navy ship of that name. Sentry was laid down on 8 October 1984 by Peterson Builders in Sturgeon Bay, Wisconsin; launched on 20 September 1986 and commissioned on 2 September 1989.

In 1993, Sentry made a 6-month cruise to Europe, joining the Standing Naval Force Channel and participating in exercise Blue Harrier, in the Baltic Sea. The ship visited Key West, Norfolk, Bermuda, Azores, Oostende, Kiel, Aarhus, Brest, St Malo, La Rochelle, Vigo, Cadiz, Porto, Lisbon, and Gibraltar during this deployment.

In 2009, Sentry changed her homeport to Naval Base San Diego.

On 15 March 2012, the U.S. Navy announced USS Sentry would be one of four minesweepers moved to the Persian Gulf region. Sentry arrived at Bahrain in June 2012.

On September 24, 2025, Sentry was decommissioned.
