= USS Defender =

1987 Avenger-class mine countermeasures ship

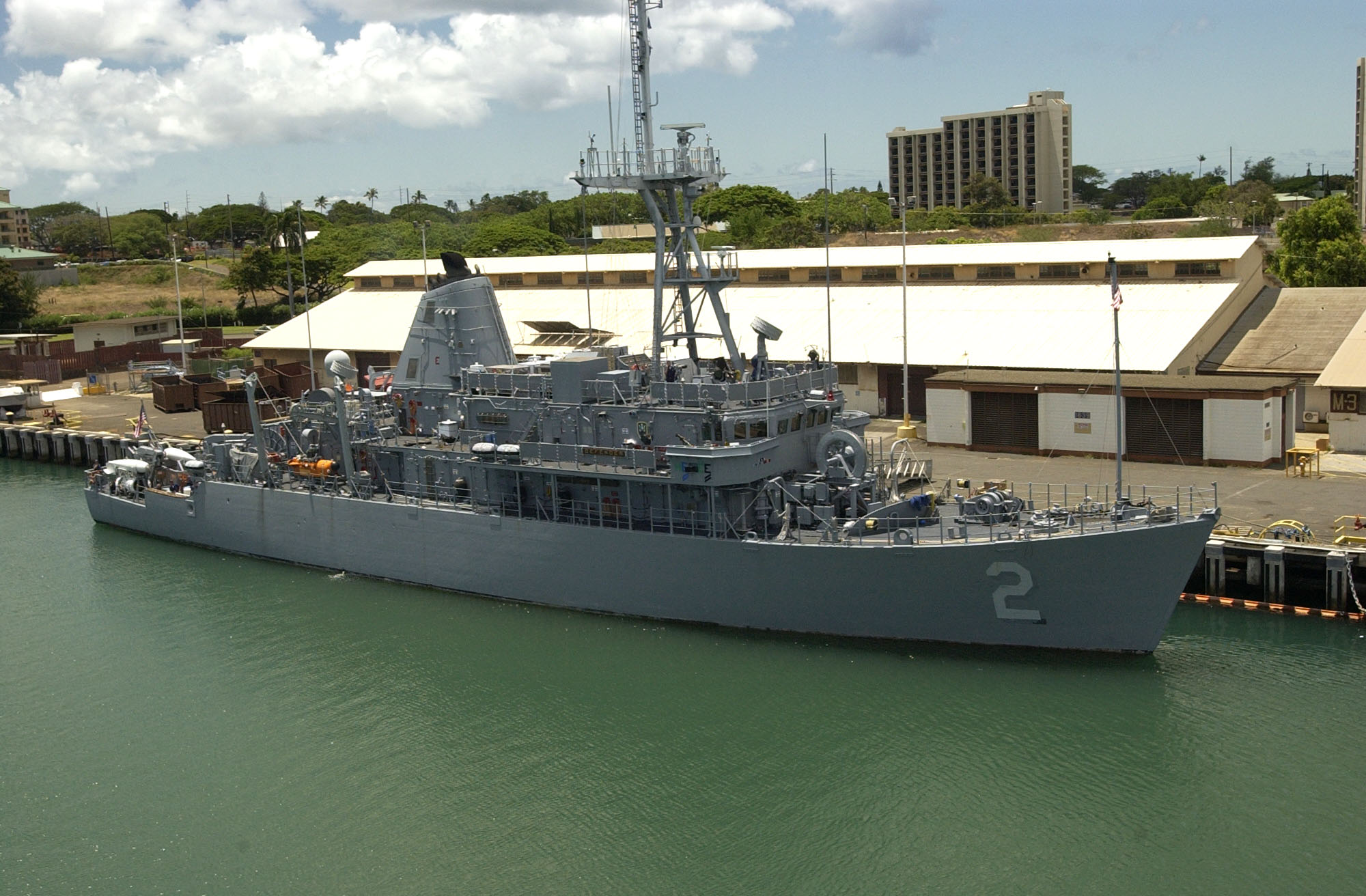
- USS Defender (MCM-2) in port Pearl Harbor Hawaii, 2004.

History

United States
- Name: USS Defender
- Laid down: 1 December 1983
- Launched: 4 April 1987
- Commissioned: 30 September 1989
- Decommissioned: 1 October 2014
- Home port: Sasebo, Japan
- Status: In reserve in the Pacific Reserve Fleet as of 2019
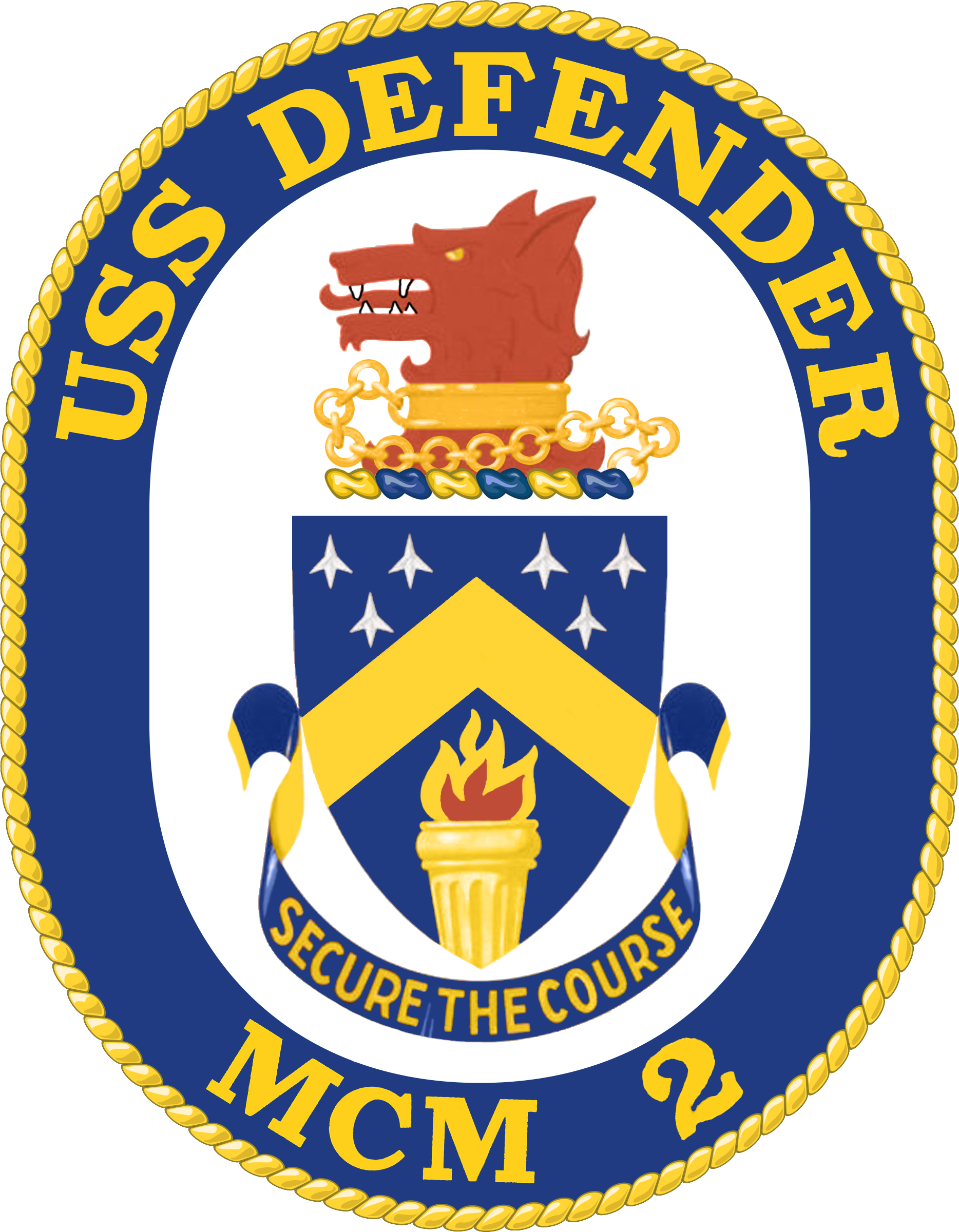
- Badge

General characteristics
- Class & type: Avenger-class mine countermeasures ship
- Displacement: 1,253 tons (light); 1,367 tons (full load)
- Length: 224 ft (68 m)
- Beam: 39 ft (12 m)
- Draft: 15 ft (4.6 m)
- Propulsion: four Waukasha Motors Co. diesel engines, two controllable reversible pitch propellers, two rudders, two electric light load propulsion motors
- Speed: 13.5 knots (25.0 km/h; 15.5 mph)
- Complement: 8 officers, 76 enlisted
- Sensors & processing systems: see text
- Electronic warfare & decoys: see text
- Armament: six M2HB .50 cal. machine guns, four M240B 7.62mm machine guns, two Mk 19 grenade launchers

USS Defender (MCM-2) was an Avenger-class mine countermeasures ship in the service of the United States Navy. She entered service in September 1989 and was decommissioned in October 2014.

== History ==
It was laid down on 1 December 1983 at Marinette Marine Corp., Marinette, Wisconsin; launched on 4 April 1987; and commissioned on 30 September 1989. As of 1 July 2009, she was active in Mine Countermeasures Squadron Seven, U.S. Pacific Fleet, permanently forward deployed to Sasebo, Japan.

Defender was decommissioned at San Diego on 1 October 2014. As of 2019, she is in reserve as a part of the Pacific Reserve Fleet.

== Systems ==
Auxiliary systems: three Waukesha ship service diesel generator sets, one solar gas turbine generator, one omnithruster bow thruster system.

Electronic systems: one AN/SSN-2 Precise Integrated Navigation System (PINS), one AN/SQQ-32 Mine Hunting Sonar, one AN/SPS-55 Surface Radar, one AN/WSN-7 Gyro compass, Mine Countermeasure Equipment Suite, one AN/SLQ-48 (V) Mine Neutralization System, one AN/SQL-37 (V) 3 Magnetic/Acoustic Influence Minesweeping Gear, Oropesa type 0 size 1 Mechanical Sweep Equipment, MDG 1701 Marconi Magnetometer Degaussing System.

== Operations ==
For a review of current year-to-year operations of USS Defender), including operations after Hurricane Katrina, see:

- Index for Histories/Command Operations Reports submitted by Defender (MCM 2)
- Mine Warfare Ships Support Hurricane Katrina Recovery, Relief Efforts
- Defender Clears Way for Shipping off Gulf Coast (2005)
