= USS Champion (MCM-4) =

Avenger-class mine countermeasures ship

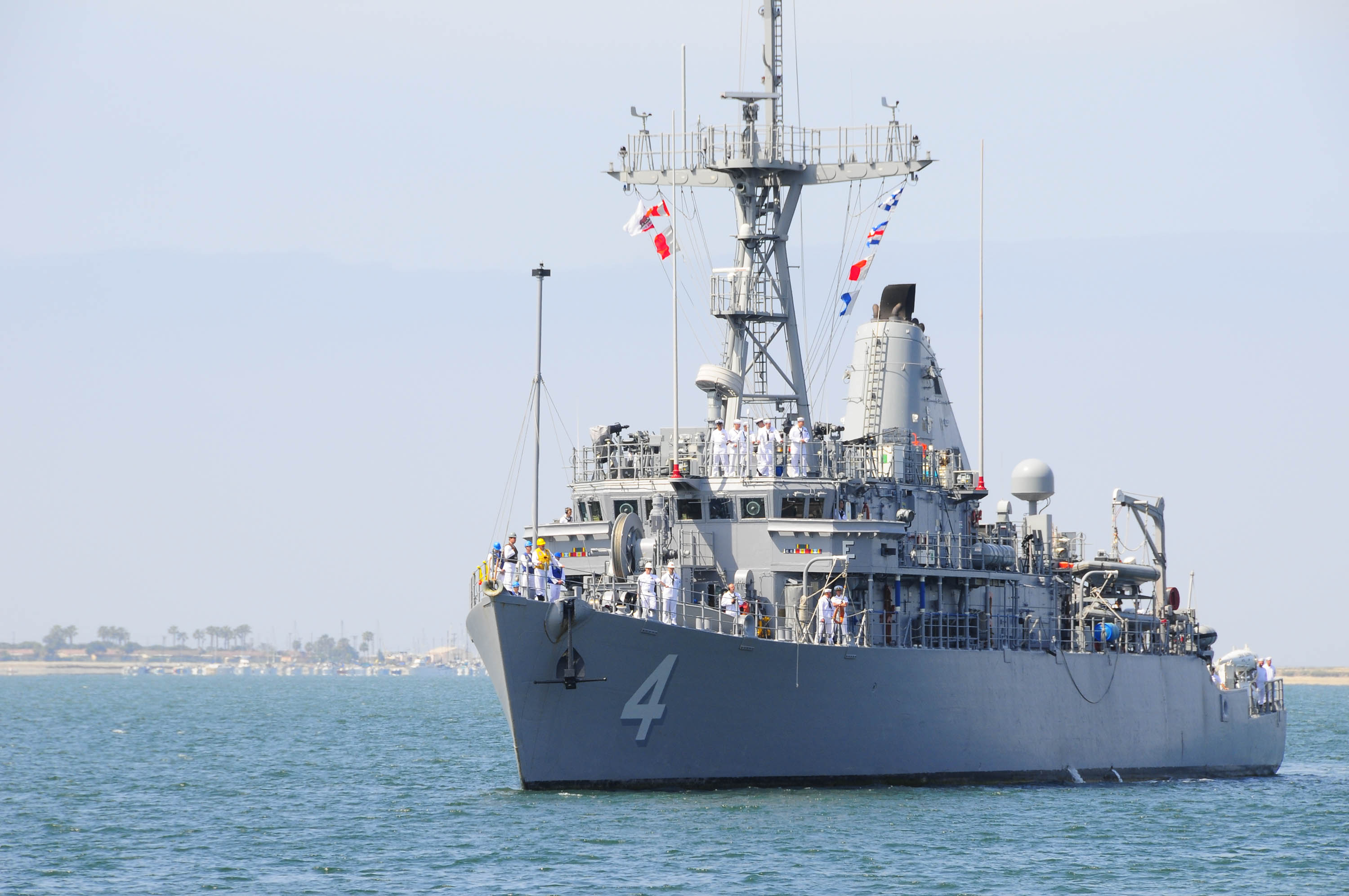
- USS Champion in 2009

History

United States
- Name: USS Champion
- Ordered: 23 December 1983
- Laid down: 28 June 1984
- Launched: 15 April 1989
- Commissioned: 7 February 1991
- Decommissioned: 25 August 2020
- Home port: Naval Station San Diego, California
- Motto: We accept the challenge
- Status: Decommissioned
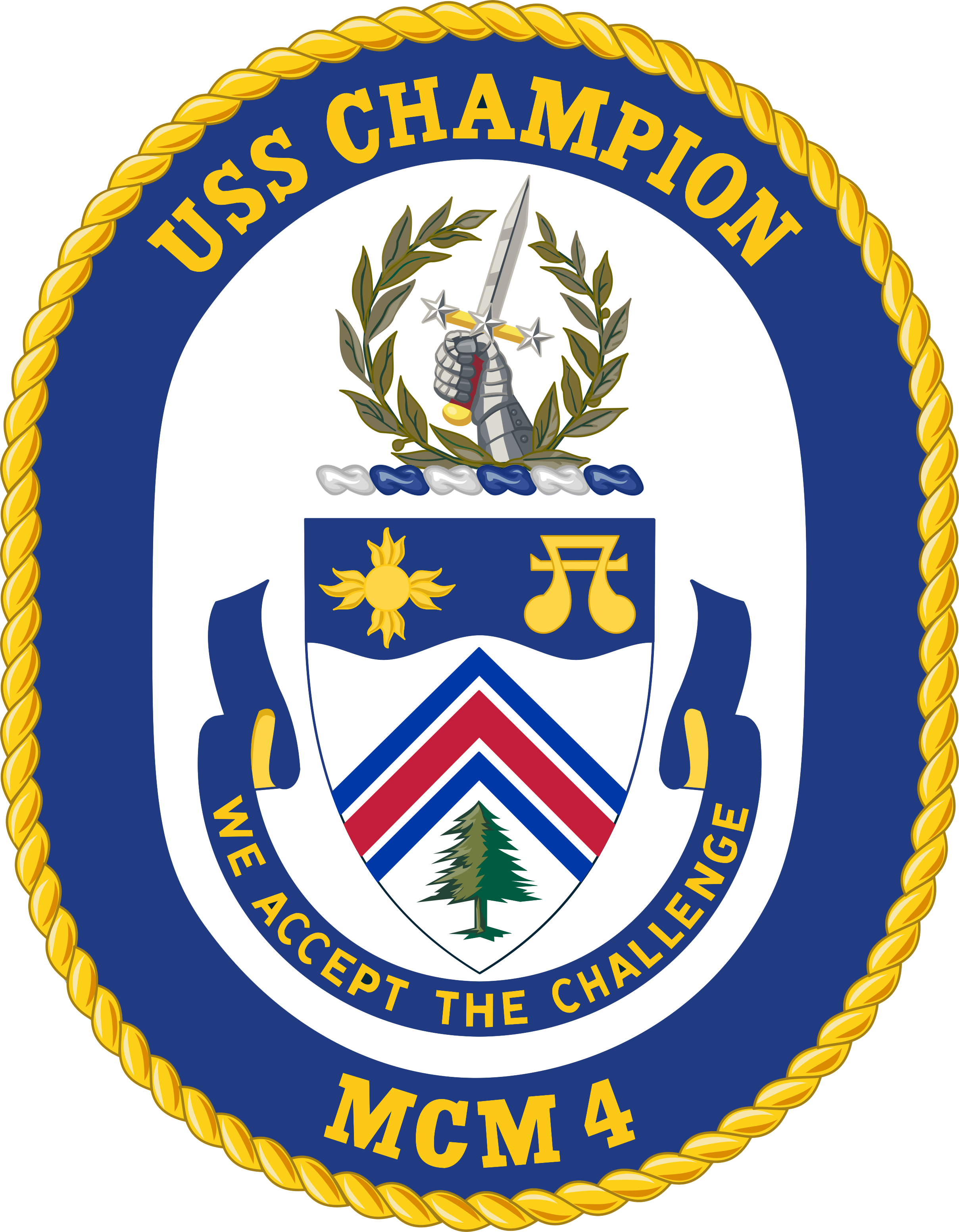
- Badge

General characteristics
- Class & type: Avenger-class mine countermeasures ship
- Displacement: 1,367 tons (1,390 t)
- Length: 224 ft (68 m)
- Beam: 39 ft (12 m)
- Draught: 15 ft (4.6 m)
- Propulsion: 4 Isotta Fraschini diesels
- Speed: 14 knots (26 km/h; 16 mph)
- Complement: 8 officers and 76 enlisted
- Sensors & processing systems: AN/SLQ-48 (V) Mine Neutralization System, N/SQL-37 (V) 3 Magnetic Acoustic Influence Minesweeping Gear, MDG 1701 Marconi Magnetometer Degaussing System
- Electronic warfare & decoys: AN/SSN-2 Precise Integrated Navigation System (PINS), AN/SQQ-32 Sonar, AN/SPS-55 Surface Radar, Oropesa type 0 size 1 Mechanical Sweep Gear
- Armament: 2 M2HB machine guns, 2 M60 machine guns, 2 Mk 19 grenade launchers

USS Champion (MCM-4), an Avenger-class mine countermeasures ship, is the fourth U.S. Navy ship of that name.

Champion was laid down on 28 June 1984 at Marinette Marine Corporation, Marinette, Wisconsin; launched on 15 April 1989; and commissioned on 7 February 1991. She was assigned to the Active Naval Reserve, Mine Countermeasures Squadron Two, US Atlantic Fleet.

While on a five-month deployment in the Mediterranean during 1999, Champion assisted in the evacuation of ethnic Albanians from war-torn Kosovo.

Champion was the recipient of the 2004 Environmental Quality Small Ship Award sponsored by the Environmental Readiness Division of the Chief of Naval Operations .

Champion was decommissioned on 25 August 2020.
