= USS Devastator (MCM-6) =

American mine countermeasures ship

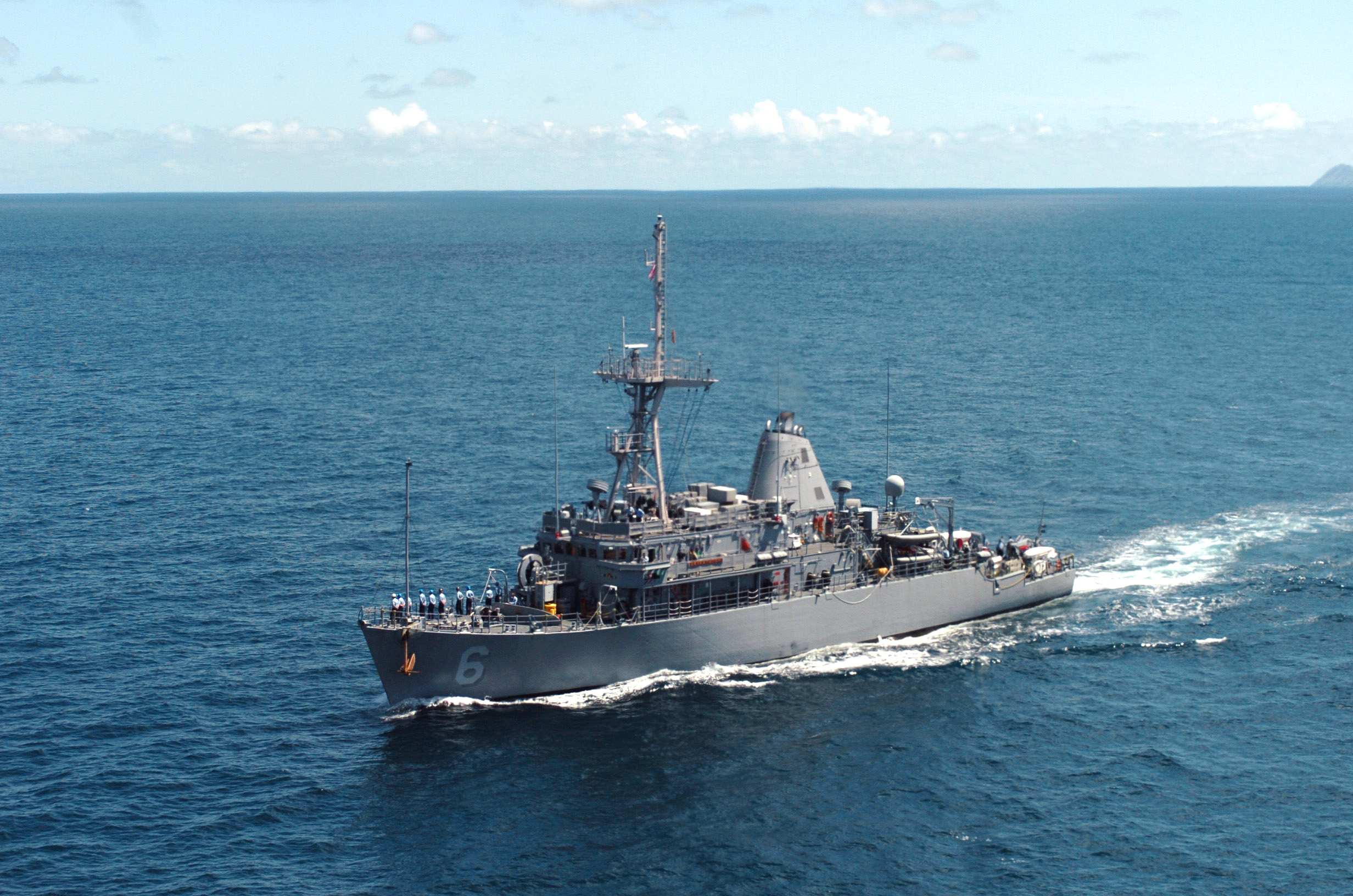
- USS Devastator off the coast of Southern California, 2005

History

United States
- Name: USS Devastator
- Awarded: 20 August 1986
- Builder: Peterson Shipbuilders
- Laid down: 9 February 1987
- Launched: 11 June 1988
- Acquired: 31 August 1990
- Commissioned: 6 October 1990
- Decommissioned: 25 September 2025
- Home port: Manama, Bahrain
- Identification: MCM-6
- Status: Decommissioned
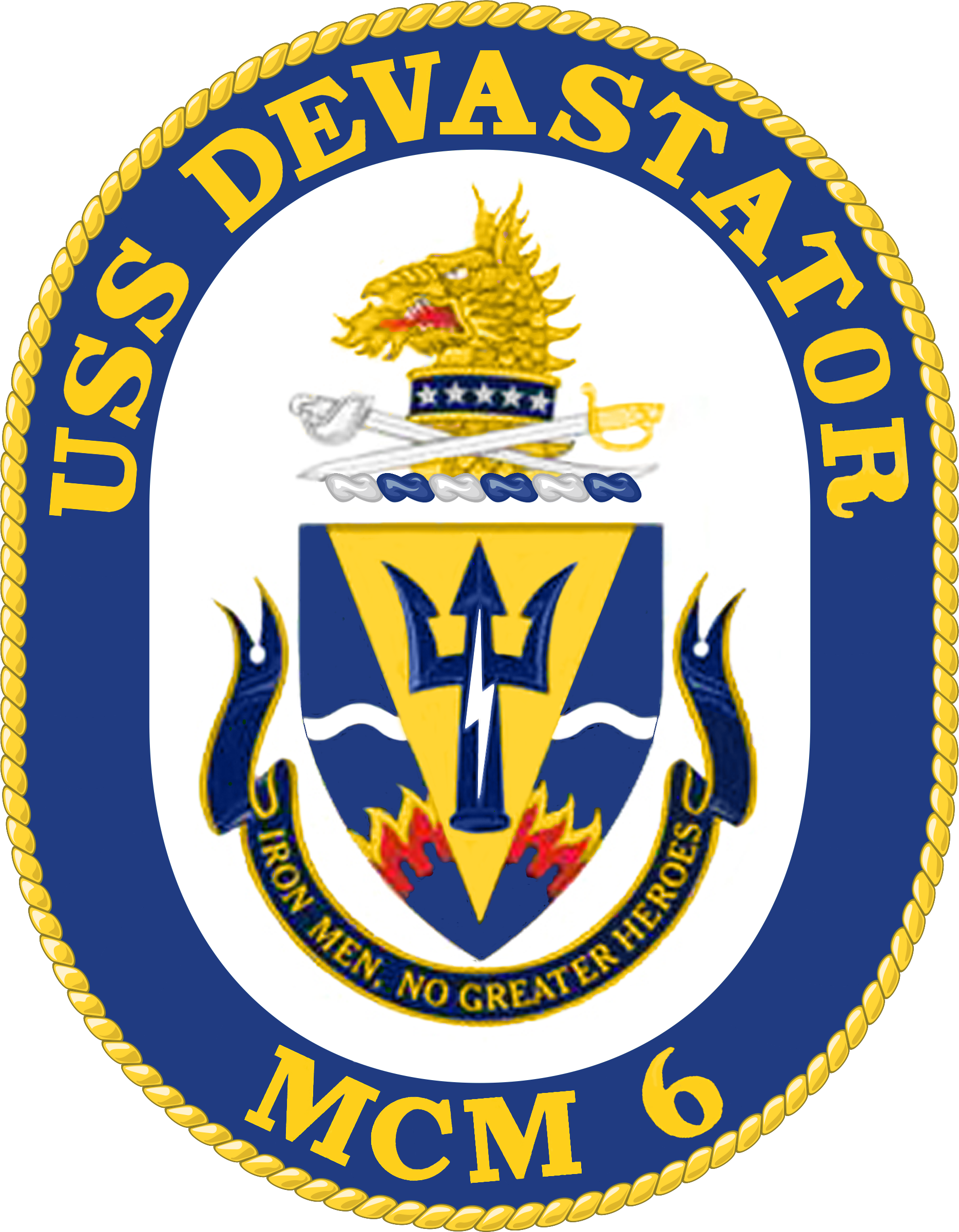
- Badge

General characteristics
- Class & type: Avenger-class mine countermeasures ship
- Displacement: 1,260 tons (light), 1,373 tons (full)
- Length: 224 ft (68 m)
- Beam: 39 ft (12 m)
- Draft: 12 ft (3.7 m)
- Propulsion: Diesel Engines
- Complement: Officers: 14 Enlisted: 85+
- Armament: AN/SLQ-48

USS Devastator (MCM-6) was an Avenger-class mine countermeasures ship of the United States Navy.

Construction of Devastator began on 9 February 1987 when her keel was laid at Peterson Shipbuilders in Sturgeon Bay, Wisconsin. Construction was finished and the vessel was launched on 11 June 1988. Devastator was commissioned into the US Navy on 6 October 1990.

On 18 February 2025 she and USCGC Clarence Sutphin Jr. rescued the crew of Iranian cargo ship Shayesteh that sprung a leak and sank in the Persian Gulf off Qatar.

On September 25, 2025, Devastator was decommissioned.
