= USS Chief (MCM-14) =

US Navy ship

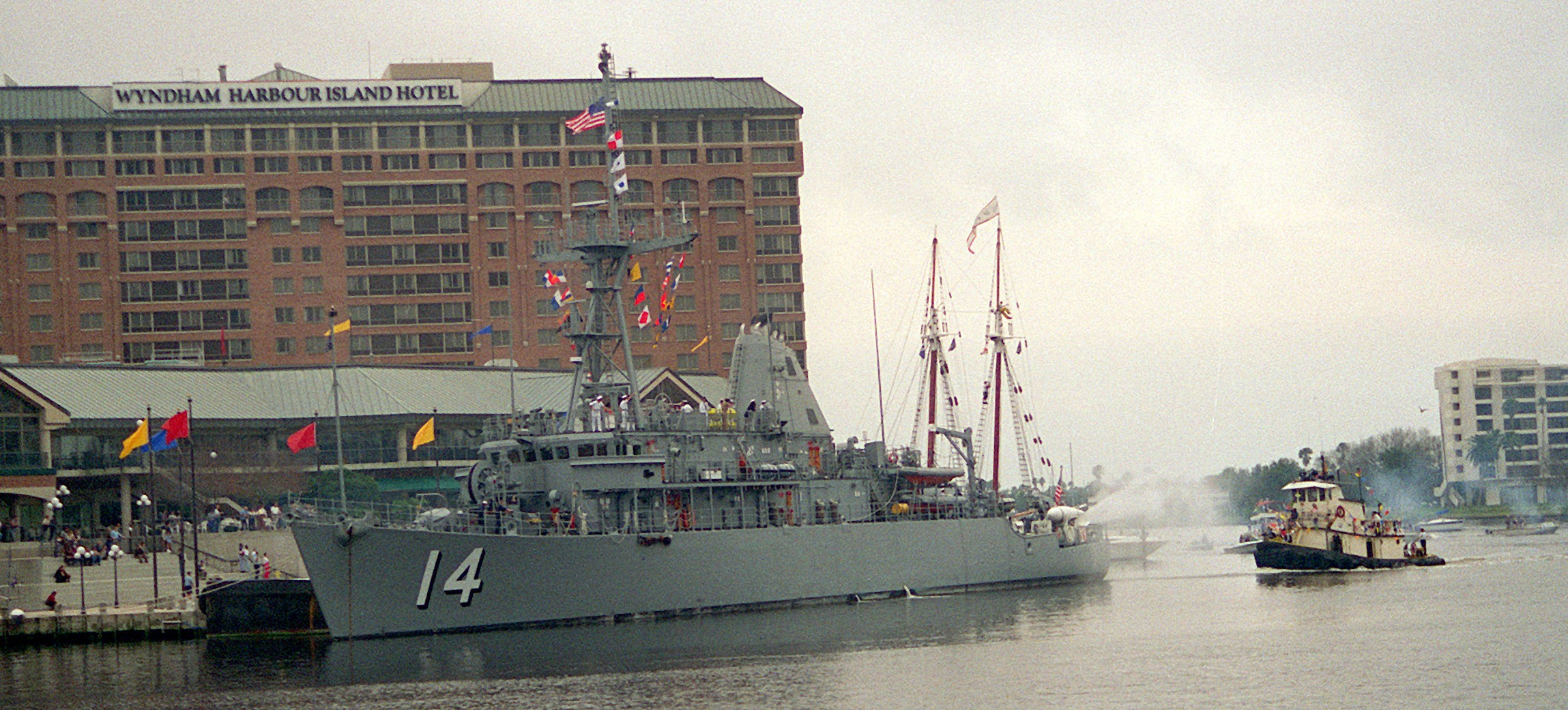
- USS Chief (MCM-14)

History

United States
- Name: Chief
- Namesake: All USN Chief petty officers
- Ordered: 12 December 1989
- Laid down: 19 August 1991
- Launched: 12 June 1993
- Commissioned: 5 November 1994
- Home port: Sasebo, Japan
- Identification: MCM-14
- Motto: "Honor, Tradition, Valor"
- Status: in active service
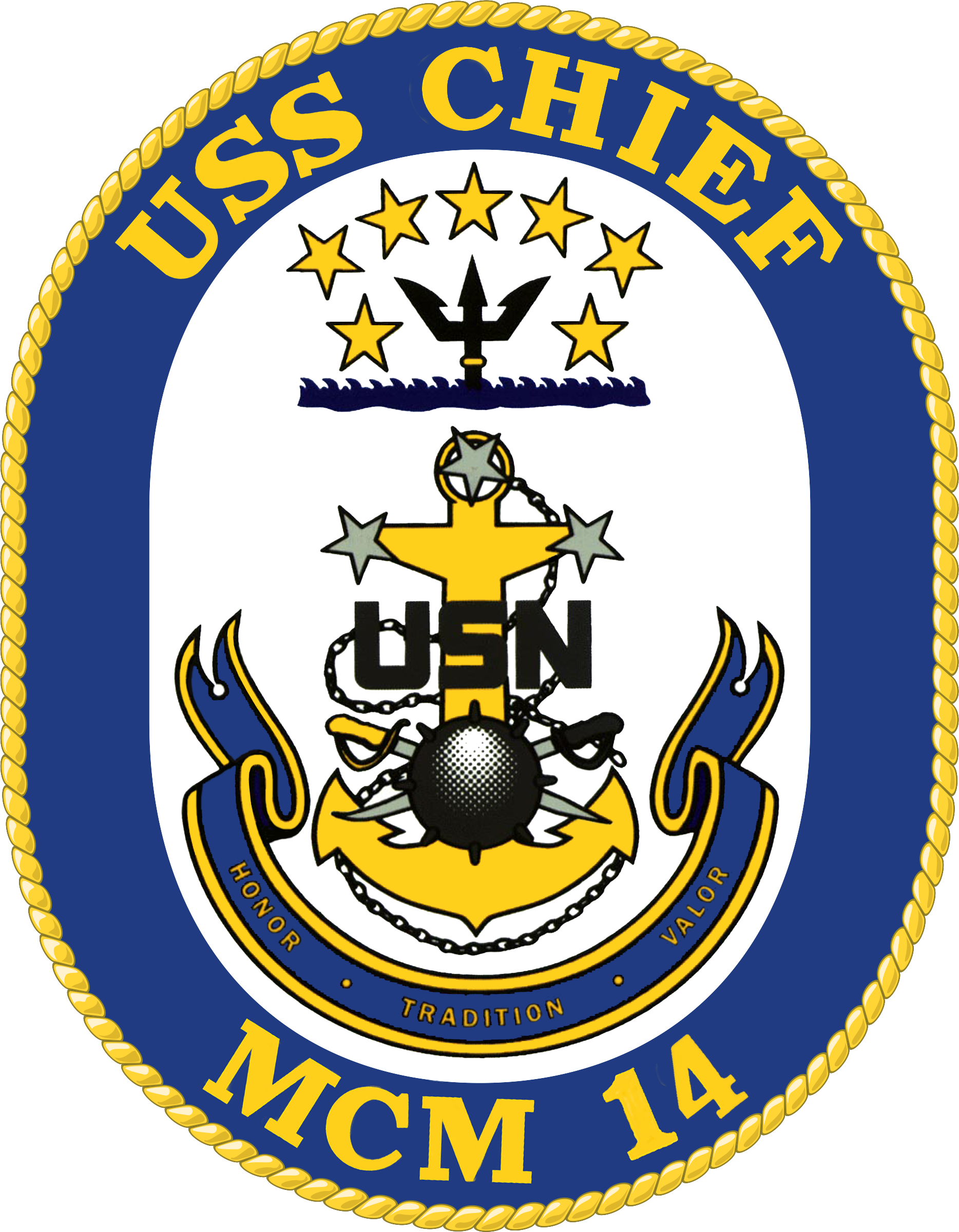
- Badge

General characteristics
- Class & type: Avenger-class mine countermeasures ship
- Displacement: 1,312 tons
- Length: 225 ft (69 m)
- Beam: 39 ft (12 m)
- Draught: 11.5 ft (3.5 m)
- Propulsion: four diesels
- Speed: 14 knots (26 km/h; 16 mph)
- Complement: 8 Officers, 6 Chief Petty Officers and 70 Enlisted
- Armament: Mine neutralization system, two .50 cal (12.7 mm) machine guns

USS Chief (MCM-14) is an Avenger-class mine countermeasures ship of the United States Navy. She was named for the former USS Chief (AM-315), which in turn was named in honor of all chief petty officers of the US Navy.

She was built by Peterson Shipbuilders, Sturgeon Bay, Wisconsin. USS Chief is homeported in Sasebo, Japan and is part of the U.S. Pacific Fleet.

== History ==
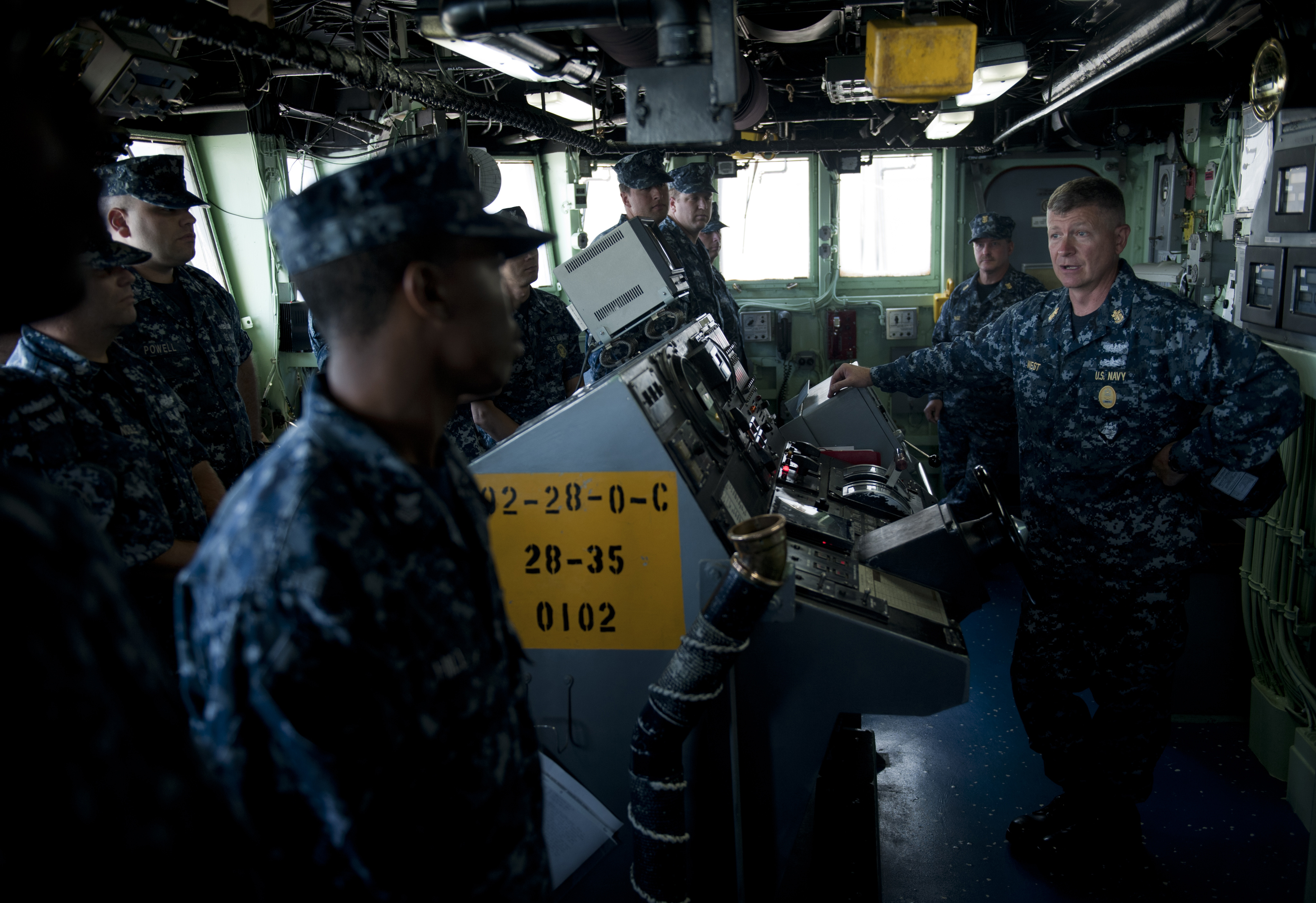
The MCPON visiting USS Chief in August 2011.

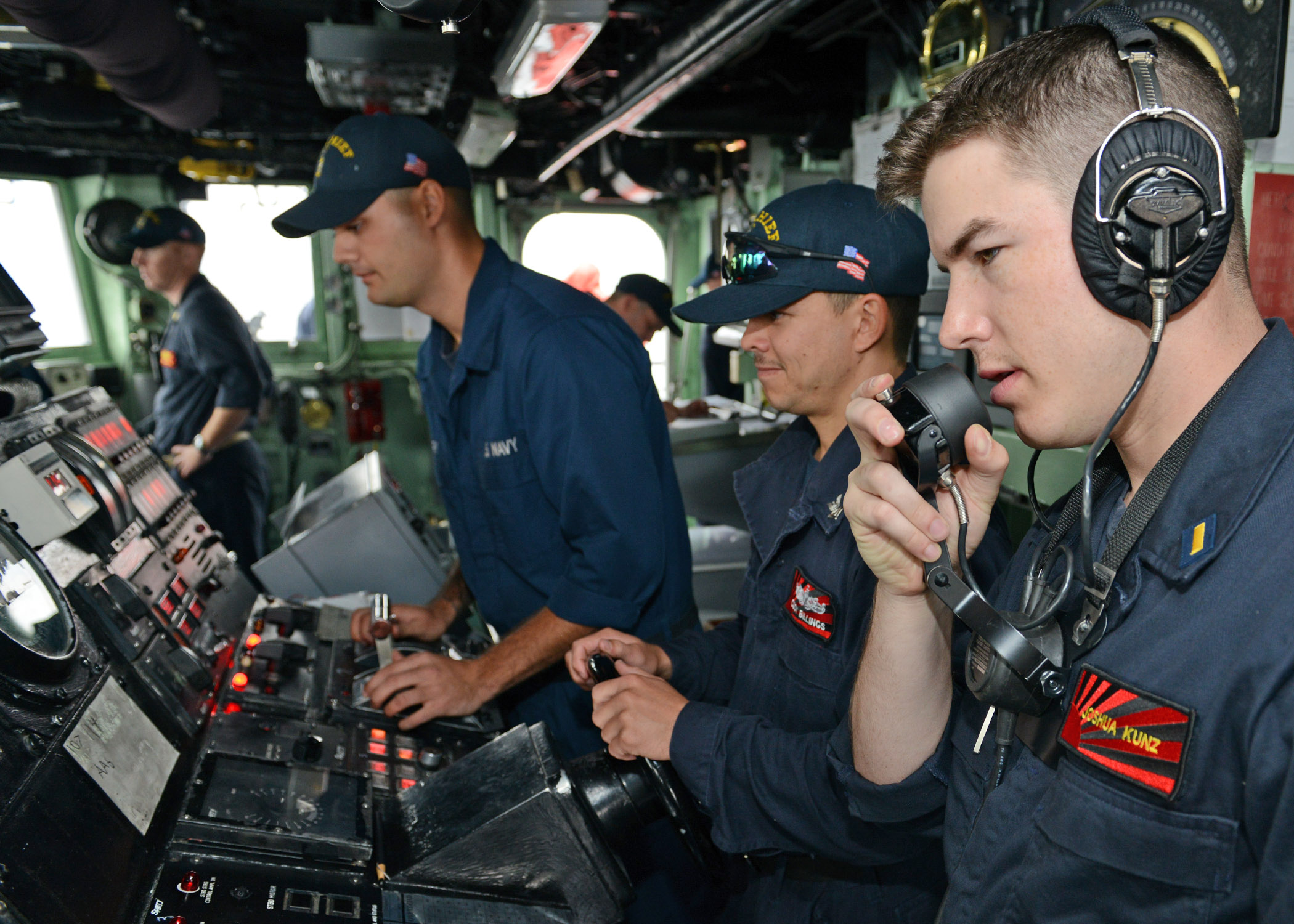
Sailors aboard USS Chief in October 2014.

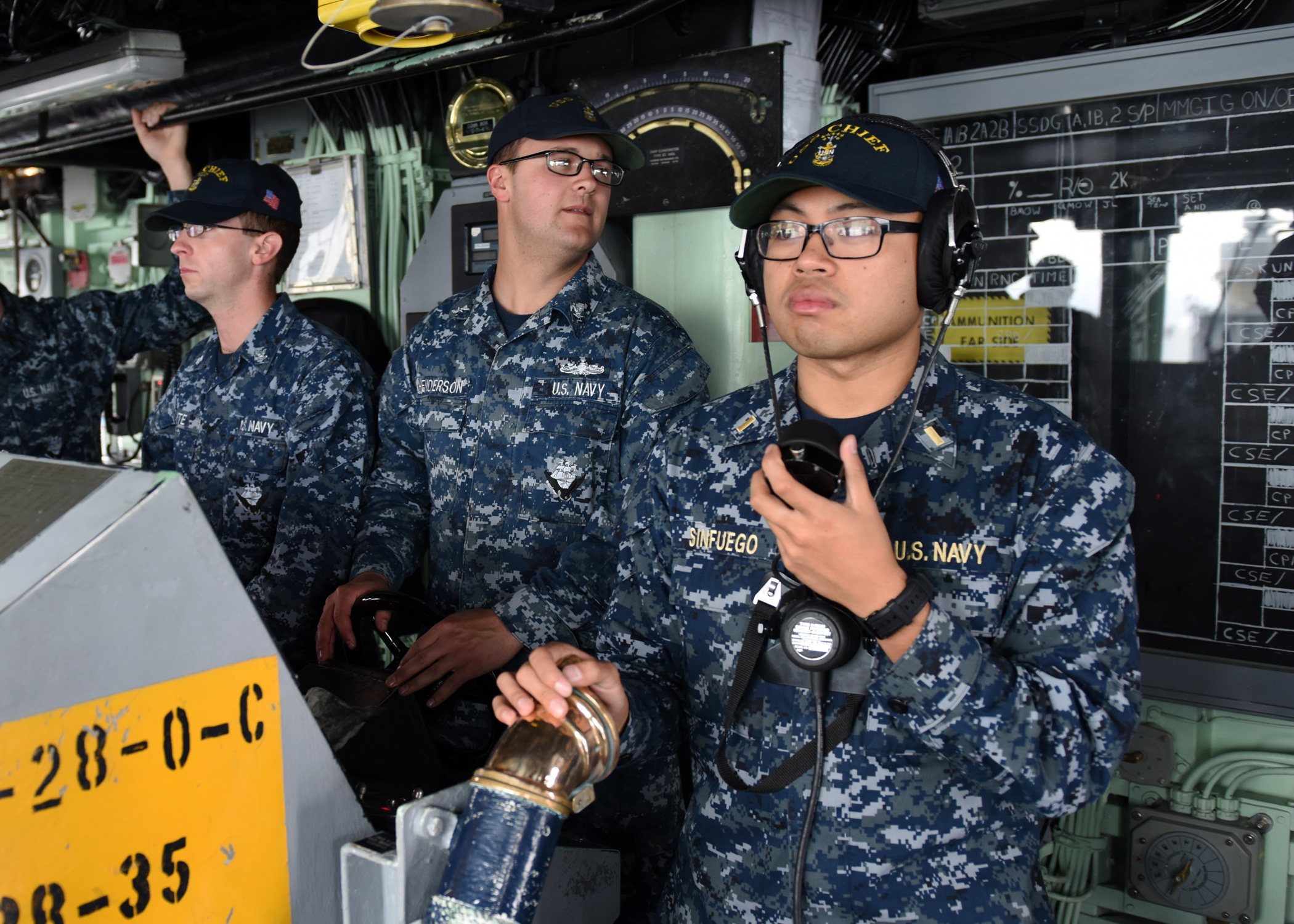
Sailors aboard USS Chief in April 2015.

USS Chief is named for the former USS Chief (AM-315), and to honor the service and tradition of the Chief Petty Officers of the United States Navy. Chief was christened by Mrs. Susan Bushey (the wife of the seventh Master Chief Petty Officer of the Navy MCPON Duane Bushey) on 12 June 1993. Construction and fitting-out was done in Sturgeon Bay, Wisconsin, and the ship was accepted from Mr. Ellsworth Peterson on behalf of the United States Navy, and placed in commission by Lieutenant Commander Timothy S. Garrold, USN, her first Commanding Officer, on 8 July 1994.

=== Crest of USS Chief ===
Navy blue and gold are the traditional colors of the United States Navy. The mine in the center of the shield represents the mine countermeasures mission of Chief while the crossed Officer's sword and Enlisted cutlass symbolize Surface Warfare excellence. The fouled Navy anchor, insignia of a Chief Petty Officer, is further symbolic of the United States Navy's leadership and commemorates the fact that Chief was launched on 12 June 1993 during the centennial of the Chief Petty Officer Corps. The three silver stars above the fouled anchor depict the leadership and service of the Master Chief Petty Officers of the Navy (MCPON) – past, present and future and honor the ship's Sponsor.

The stars are also arranged in the same manner about the anchor as the international navigational symbol for lights and shapes about the mast; signifying a vessel engaged in mine clearance operations. There are 84 links in the fouled anchor chain, one for each plank owner, the ship's sponsor, and the Matron of Honor. The trident atop the crest denotes seapower. The blue and white surface from which it rises represents the sea, upon which the ship was born.

Surrounding the trident are seven stars representing the seven Battle Stars won during the Second World War and the Korean War by the first ship to bear the name Chief, USS Chief (AM-315). The five above the trident for World War II and the two alongside for the Korean War.

Between 2006 and 2007, the first command senior enlisted who were graduates of the Command Master Chief/COB class at Newport, Rhode Island, were appointed to minesweeper units. The command senior chief billet was established and provided guidance and advocacy for enlisted sailors assigned to the ship. The command senior chief served as an advisor to the commanding officer on all issues pertaining to enlisted matters. While command senior chiefs were assigned to "crews" and not the ship specifically, it is hard to determine who was the first rated command senior chief on board USS Chief. However, records show that CMDCM(AW/SW) Jim Cahill and HMCS(SW/FMF) Chad Smith from Crew Conflict were the first command-appointed senior enlisted leaders on board USS Chief (MCM-14). In January 2015, the navy announced the command senior chief rating CMDCS, whereas previously assigned senior enlisted leaders retained their rating.
