= USS Dextrous (MCM-13) =

1992 mine countermeasures ship

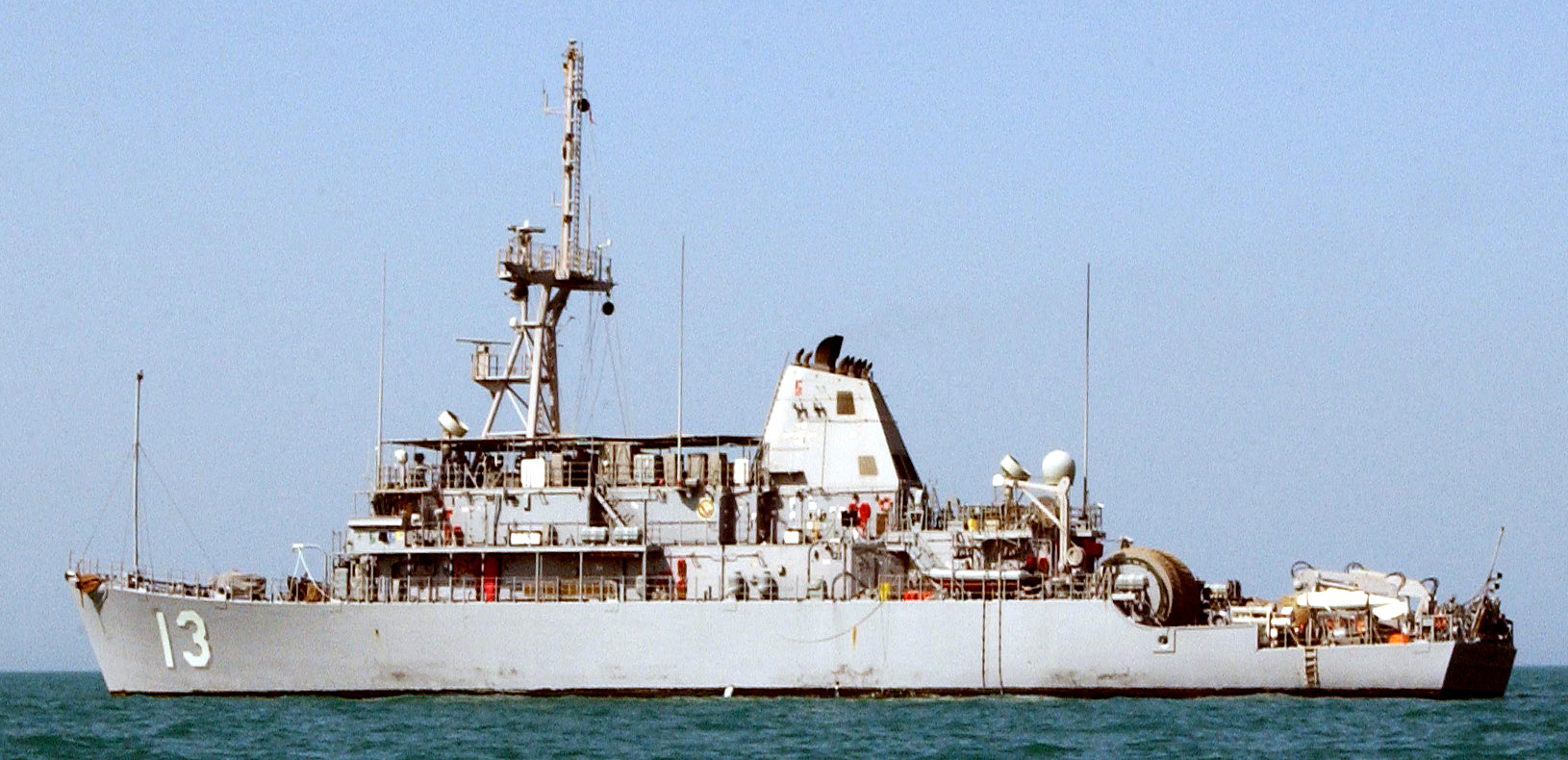
- USS Dextrous in the Persian Gulf in 2004

History

United States
- Name: USS Dextrous
- Ordered: 12 December 1989
- Laid down: 11 March 1991
- Launched: 20 June 1992
- Christened: 3 December 1993
- Commissioned: 9 July 1994
- Decommissioned: 3 September 2025
- Home port: Manama, Bahrain
- Identification: MCM-13
- Status: Decommissioned
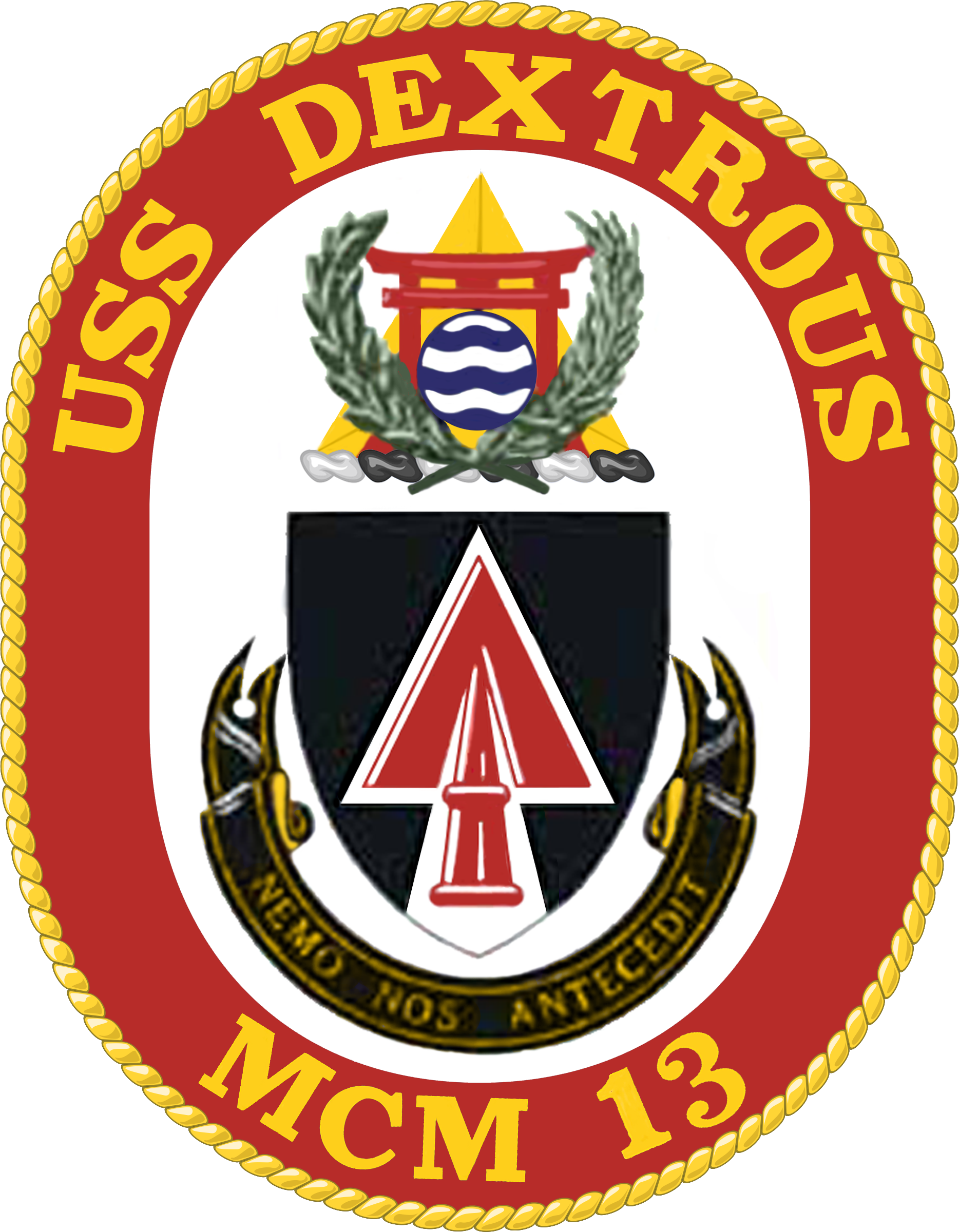
- Badge

General characteristics
- Class & type: Avenger-class mine countermeasures ship
- Displacement: 1,312 tons
- Length: 224 ft (68 m)
- Beam: 39 ft (12 m)
- Draught: 11.5 ft (3.5 m)
- Propulsion: four diesels
- Speed: 14 knots (26 km/h; 16 mph)
- Capacity: 84
- Complement: 8 Officers, 6 Chief Petty Officers and 58 Enlisted
- Crew: 84
- Armament: AN/SLQ-48 Mine neutralization system, two .50 cal (12.7 mm) machine guns

USS Dextrous (MCM-13) was an Avenger-class mine countermeasures ship in the United States Navy.

She was built by Peterson Shipbuilders, Sturgeon Bay, Wisconsin. Mrs. Jacqueline E. Schafer, the Assistant SECNAV for Installations and Environment, served as sponsor of the ship.

On March 31, 1994, USS Dextrous got underway for the first time to conduct Builder’s trials and conducted a series of tests over the coming months before eventually conducting the 59-day transit south from Sturgeon Bay, Wisconsin to her first home port at Naval Station Ingleside, Texas. Shortly after her arrival, USS Dextrous was commissioned during a ceremony in Ingleside, TX on July 9, 1994.

Between February 1997 and August 1997, USS Dextrous was heavy sealift transported to Mina Salman Pier, homeported in Manama, Bahrain. In the decades since arriving in Bahrain, USS Dextrous conducted dozens of critical exercises and real world operations in support of contingency planning and mine clearing within the Persian Gulf, to include earning a Combat Action Ribbon for her work during Operation Iraqi Freedom. She has worked with over a dozen allied and partner nations in support of the MCM mission and was a major operational asset to U.S Fifth Fleet.

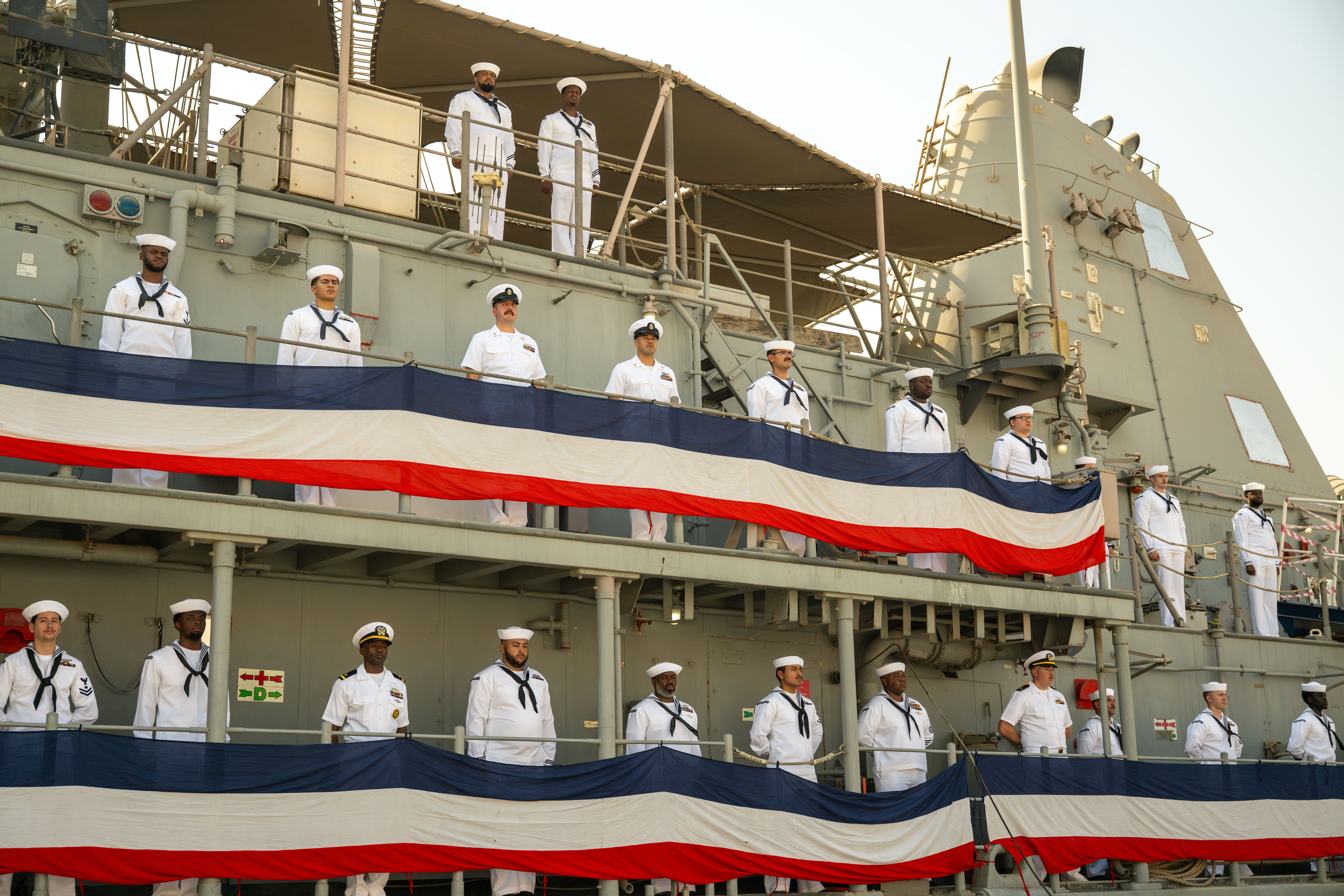
The crew of Dexterous man the rails during decommissioning, 3 September 2025

Dextrous held a decommissioning ceremony at Naval support activity Bahrain on September 3rd, 2025.
