= USS Ability (MSO-519) =

Minesweeper of the United States Navy

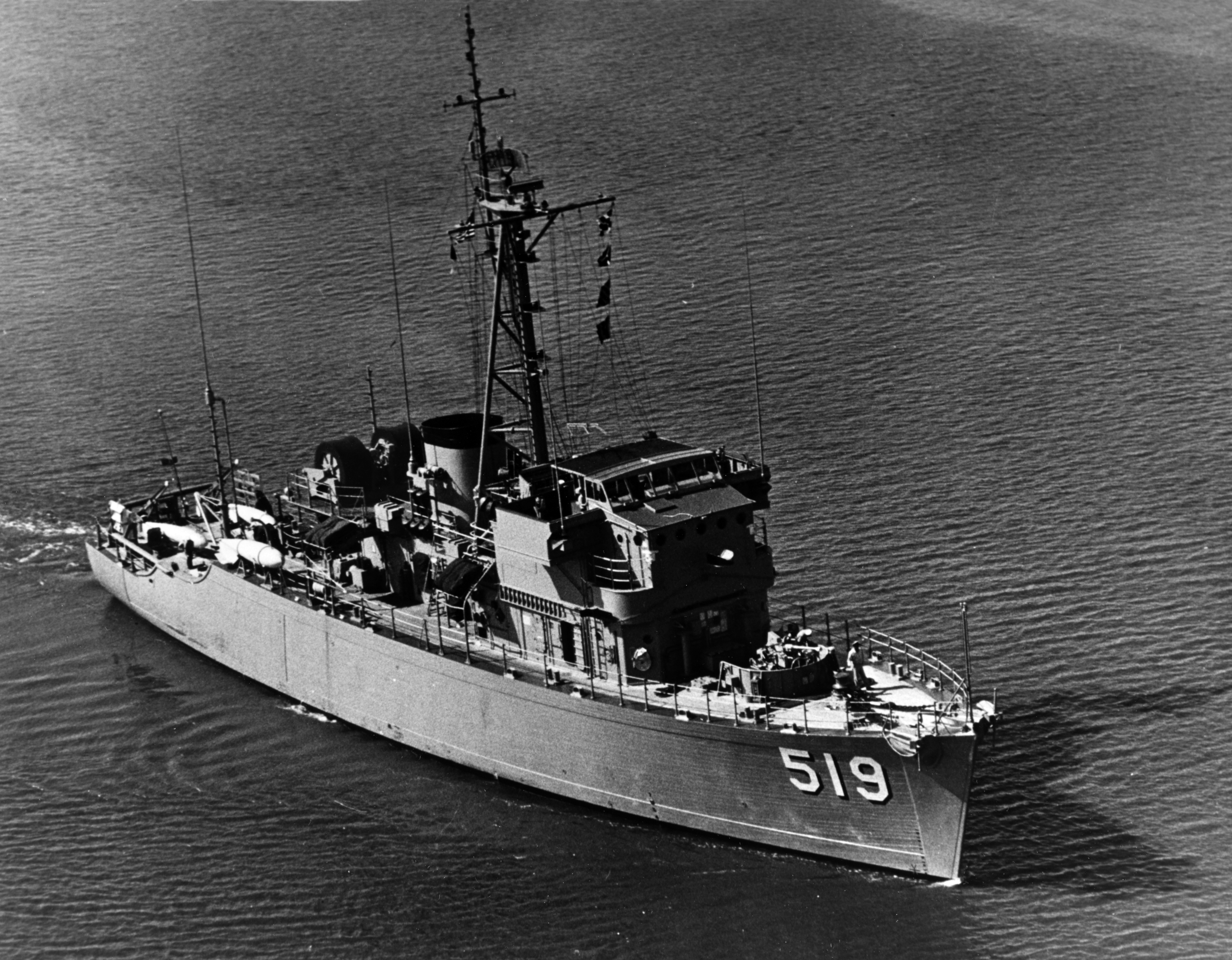

History

United States
- Name: USS Ability
- Builder: Peterson Builders
- Laid down: 5 March 1956
- Launched: 29 December 1956
- Commissioned: 4 August 1958
- Decommissioned: June 1970
- Stricken: 1 February 1971
- Fate: Sold for scrap

General characteristics
- Class & type: Ability-class minesweeper
- Displacement: 934 long tons (949 t)
- Length: 190 ft (58 m)
- Beam: 36 ft (11 m)
- Draft: 12 ft (3.7 m)
- Speed: 15 knots (28 km/h; 17 mph)
- Complement: 83 officers and enlisted
- Armament: 1 × 40 mm guns; 2 × .50 cal (12.7 mm) machine guns

The second USS Ability (MSO-519) was an Ability-class minesweeper in the service of the United States Navy.

She was laid down on 5 March 1956 at Sturgeon Bay, Wisconsin by Peterson Builders, launched on 29 December 1956, sponsored by Mrs. Henry P. Williams, and commissioned on 4 August 1958 with Lt. Comdr. W. L. Hough in command.

== Service history ==
=== Charleston, 1958–1965 ===
Following outfitting, the minesweeper put to sea on 28 August – bound for Charleston, S.C. — and, on the 29th, reported for duty with Mine Squadron (MinRon) 4. She remained at Charleston until embarking upon her shakedown cruise on 17 September. The ship conducted that training out of Guantánamo Bay, Cuba, and returned to Charleston on 20 October. She served with Mine Division (MinDiv) 45, operating out of Charleston through the end of 1958 and the first six months of 1959. On 1 July 1959, she was transferred to MinDiv 85 as its flagship. Ability continued to operate out of Charleston, primarily in support of the Naval Mine Warfare School. She also occasionally provided support services to the Naval Ordnance Laboratory Test Facility located at Port Everglades, Florida, and to the Naval Mine Defense Laboratory at Panama City, Florida. When not engaged in those duties, she conducted independent ship's exercises and type training along the east coast and in the West Indies.

The year 1960 began normally for Ability with operations out of Charleston in support of the Naval Mine Warfare School and the Naval Mine Defense Laboratory. That autumn, however, she added a new dimension to her operations which would remain a facet of her service for the remainder of her career. Late in September, the minesweeper stood out of Charleston bound for the Mediterranean Sea and her first tour of duty with the 6th Fleet. On 5 October, she reported for duty with the Commander, 6th Fleet, at Rota, Spain. Ability spent the next four months conducting minesweeping exercises, supporting amphibious landing exercises, and visiting various Mediterranean ports. On 12 February 1961, she completed turnover ceremonies at Rota, shaped a course for Charleston, and arrived back in her home port on 1 March 1961.

Ability served as a close recovery vessel in May 1961 during the "Freedom 7" space shot. For the last two months of 1962, she supported the quarantine of Cuba brought about by the siting of offensive Soviet missiles on that island. She began that duty patrolling the Windward Passage but concluded it as a harbor defense ship for the American base at Guantánamo Bay.

For the remainder of 1964 and all of 1965, she conducted operations out of Charleston in support of the Naval Mine Defense Laboratory and made voyages along the east coast and to the West Indies to participate in various exercises and to engage in refresher training. Her highlight of 1965 came in December when she provided support services for the "Gemini 6" and "Gemini 7" space shots.

=== Mediterranean, 1966–1970 ===
Early in 1966, Ability embarked upon another assignment with the 6th Fleet. In February, soon after her arrival in the Mediterranean, she participated in the search for an American nuclear device lost when two Air Force planes, a B-52 bomber and a KC-135 cargo plane, collided in midair. Otherwise, the deployment consisted of the usual exercises and port visits. Ability returned to Charleston on 13 July 1966 and resumed services to the Mine Defense Laboratory and the Mine Warfare School. That employment lasted until 11 May 1967, when she shaped a course for Montreal, Canada, to make a goodwill visit to the world's fair at that city, Expo '67. After also visiting Quebec, the minesweeper resumed her normal duties at Charleston on 9 June 1967.

In early 1968 the Ability deployed to the Caribbean in support of the Amphibious Ready Squadron. She returned to Charleston in May 1968.

On 25 July 1968, Ability embarked upon her final Mediterranean cruise. The assignment lasted until late November and consisted of normal 6th Fleet operations – exercises, port visits, and Soviet ship surveillance missions. On 30 November, she departed Gibraltar bound for the United States. The minesweeper reentered Charleston harbor on 15 December and began a holiday leave and upkeep period. During 1969 and the first five months of 1970, Ability busied herself with normal east coast and West Indies operations.

=== Decommissioning and sale ===
In June 1970, she was placed out of commission to undergo extensive repairs and modifications at Todd Pacific Shipyards Corp. in Brooklyn, New York. The contract for her rehabilitation, however, was terminated on 16 October 1970 as a result of Department of the Navy force level decisions. Determined to be excess to the needs of the Navy, Ability was struck from the Navy List on 1 February 1971. She was subsequently sold for scrapping.
