= USS Gladiator (MCM-11) =

1991 Avenger-class ship

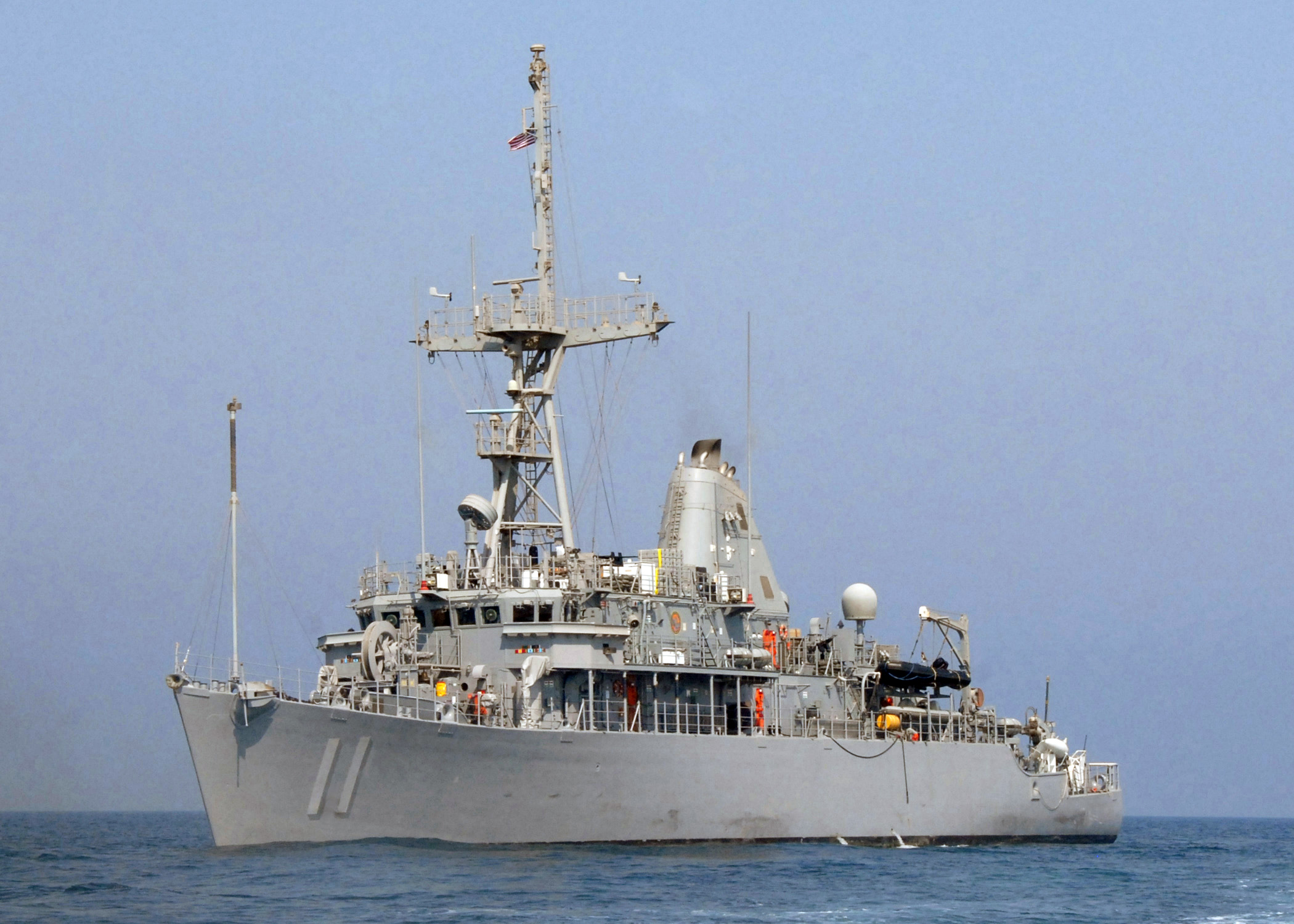
- USS Gladiator (MCM-11) underway off the coast of Bahrain, in August 2007.

History

United States
- Name: USS Gladiator
- Awarded: 14 February 1989
- Builder: Peterson Builders, Sturgeon Bay, Wisconsin
- Laid down: 7 May 1990
- Launched: 29 June 1991
- Commissioned: 18 September 1993
- Decommissioned: 4 September 2025
- Home port: Manama, Bahrain
- Identification: MCM-11
- Status: Decommissioned
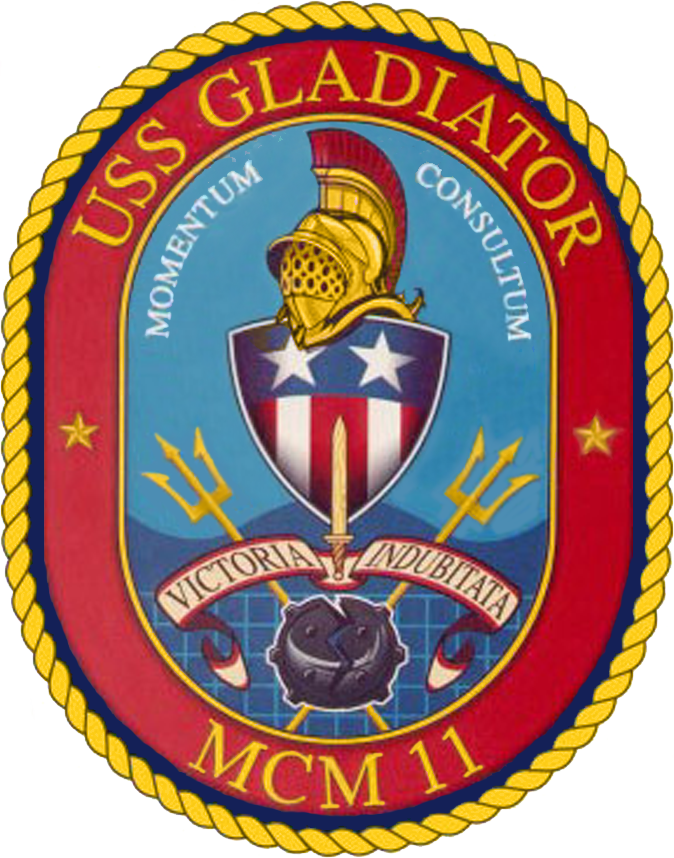
- Badge

General characteristics
- Class & type: Avenger-class mine countermeasures ship
- Displacement: 1,250 long tons (1,270 t)
- Length: 224 ft (68 m)
- Beam: 39 ft (12 m)
- Draft: 12 ft (3.7 m)
- Speed: 14 knots (16 mph; 26 km/h)
- Complement: 6 officers and 75 enlisted
- Armament: 2 × M2HB Browning .50-caliber heavy machine guns; 2 × M60 7.62 mm machine guns, 2 × Mk 19 grenade launchers

USS Gladiator (MCM-11) was an Avenger-class mine countermeasures ship of the United States Navy, and is the third U.S. Navy ship to bear that name.

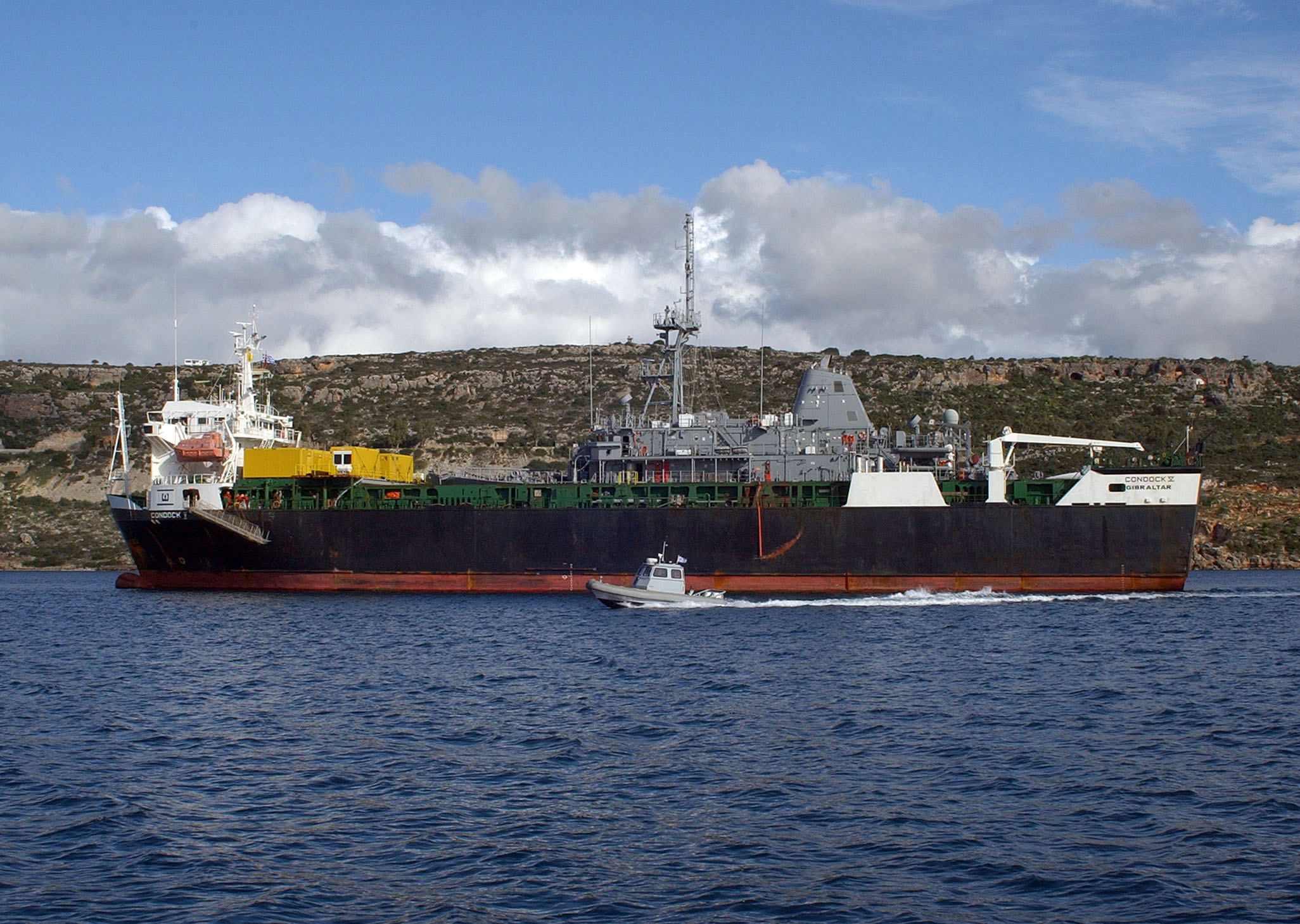
Gladiator onboard MV Condock V for transport in January 2007.

== Awards ==
- Navy Unit Commendation
- Navy E Ribbon
- National Defense Service Medal with star
- Global War on Terrorism Expeditionary Medal
- Global War on Terrorism Service Medal
- Sea Service Deployment Ribbon

== In popular culture ==
The ship was featured in Mega Movers, when it was transported to Bahrain on top of a heavy lift ship.

== History ==
In 2024, USS Gladiator was involved in a collision with HMS Bangor causing some damage to the latter vessel.
