= USS Chief (AM-315) =

Minesweeper of the United States Navy

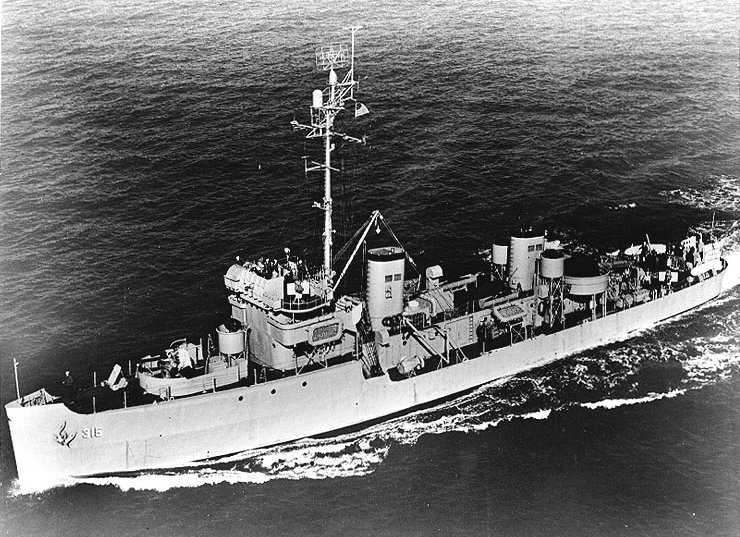
- Chief in 1952

History

United States
- Name: HMS Alice (BAM-2)
- Builder: General Engineering & Dry Dock Company, Alameda, California
- Laid down: 25 July 1942
- Launched: 5 January 1943
- Renamed: USS Chief (AM-315), 23 January 1943
- Commissioned: 9 October 1943
- Decommissioned: 17 March 1947
- Recommissioned: 28 February 1952
- Reclassified: MSF-315, 7 February 1955
- Decommissioned: 15 March 1955
- Stricken: 1 July 1972
- Honours and awards: 5 battle stars (World War II); 2 battle stars (Korea)
- Fate: Sold to Mexico, February 1973

History

Mexico
- Name: ARM Jesús González Ortega (C83)
- Namesake: Jesús González Ortega
- Acquired: February 1973
- Reclassified: G15
- Reclassified: P114, 1993
- Status: in active service, as of 2007

General characteristics
- Class & type: Auk-class minesweeper
- Displacement: 890 long tons (904 t)
- Length: 221 ft 3 in (67.44 m)
- Beam: 32 ft (9.8 m)
- Draft: 10 ft 9 in (3.28 m)
- Speed: 18 knots (33 km/h; 21 mph)
- Complement: 100 officers and enlisted
- Armament: 1 × 3"/50 caliber gun; 2 × 40 mm guns; 2 × 20 mm guns; 2 × Depth charge tracks

USS Chief (AM-315) was an Auk-class minesweeper acquired by the United States Navy for the dangerous task of removing mines from minefields laid in the water to prevent ships from passing, and named after the word "chief," the head or leader of a group.

Originally intended for Great Britain, HMS Alice (BAM-2) was launched 5 January 1943 by General Engineering and Dry Dock Co., Alameda, California; renamed and reclassified USS Chief (AM-315), 23 January 1943; and commissioned 9 October 1943.

== Service history ==
=== World War II ===
Departing San Diego, California, 7 December 1943, Chief joined in exercises in Hawaiian waters until 22 January 1944 when she sailed for Kwajalein. She swept the harbor and joined the antisubmarine patrol until 14 February, when she returned to Pearl Harbor for repairs. Except for a convoy escort voyage to Eniwetok (21 March-15 April), she remained at Pearl Harbor until 29 May.

Joining Task Force TF 52 at Eniwetok, Chief sortied 12 June 1944 for the Marianas operation. Between 15 June and 7 August, she cleared mines for the invasions of Saipan and Tinian, and gave fire support to troops ashore, then had local duty at Saipan. Departing 9 September she escorted cargo ship De Grasse (AP-164) to Pearl Harbor, then continued to San Francisco, California for overhaul.

Returning to Pearl Harbor on 2 January 1945, Chief voyaged to Eniwetok on convoy escort duty, then conducted exercises in Hawaiian waters until clearing for Ulithi, where she arrived 4 March. After receiving new equipment, she sailed for Okinawa on 15 May. From 26 May to 21 August she acted as flagship for the group conducting hydrographic survey of Unten Ko, and developing it as a minecraft typhoon anchorage.

On 8 September Chief put out for Wakayama, Japan, where until 6 October she swept minefields in preparation for the arrival of occupation forces. She also assisted in the salvage of YMS-418 on 28 September. Chief remained on occupation duty at Nagoya and Sasebo, Japan, until 10 March 1946 when she steamed for San Francisco, California, arriving 19 April. She was placed out of commission in reserve 17 March 1947, berthed at San Pedro, California.

=== Korea ===
Recommissioned 28 February 1952 at Long Beach, Chief conducted training exercises off San Diego, California, until 7 July when she sailed for Sasebo, Japan, arriving 3 August. She operated with Task Force TF 95 around mine-infested Wonsan Harbor and was twice fired on by enemy shore batteries. She returned to Long Beach, California 5 February 1953 for local operations and training.

Her second Korean tour from 5 October 1953 to 2 June 1954 found her patrolling with Task Force TF 95 off both coasts of Korea to preserve the truce. She returned to west coast operations.

=== Decommissioning and sale ===
On 1 November 1954 Chief was placed in commission in reserve. Reclassified MSF-315 on 7 February 1955, she was placed out of commission in reserve 15 March 1955. Chief was sold to Mexico in February 1973. Renamed ARM Jesús González Ortega (C83), she remained in active service with the Mexican Navy as of 2007, and was afloat as of 2016.

== Awards and honors ==
Chief received five battle stars for World War II service and two battle stars for Korean War service.
