= HMAS Diamantina (M 86) =

2000 Huon-class minehunter

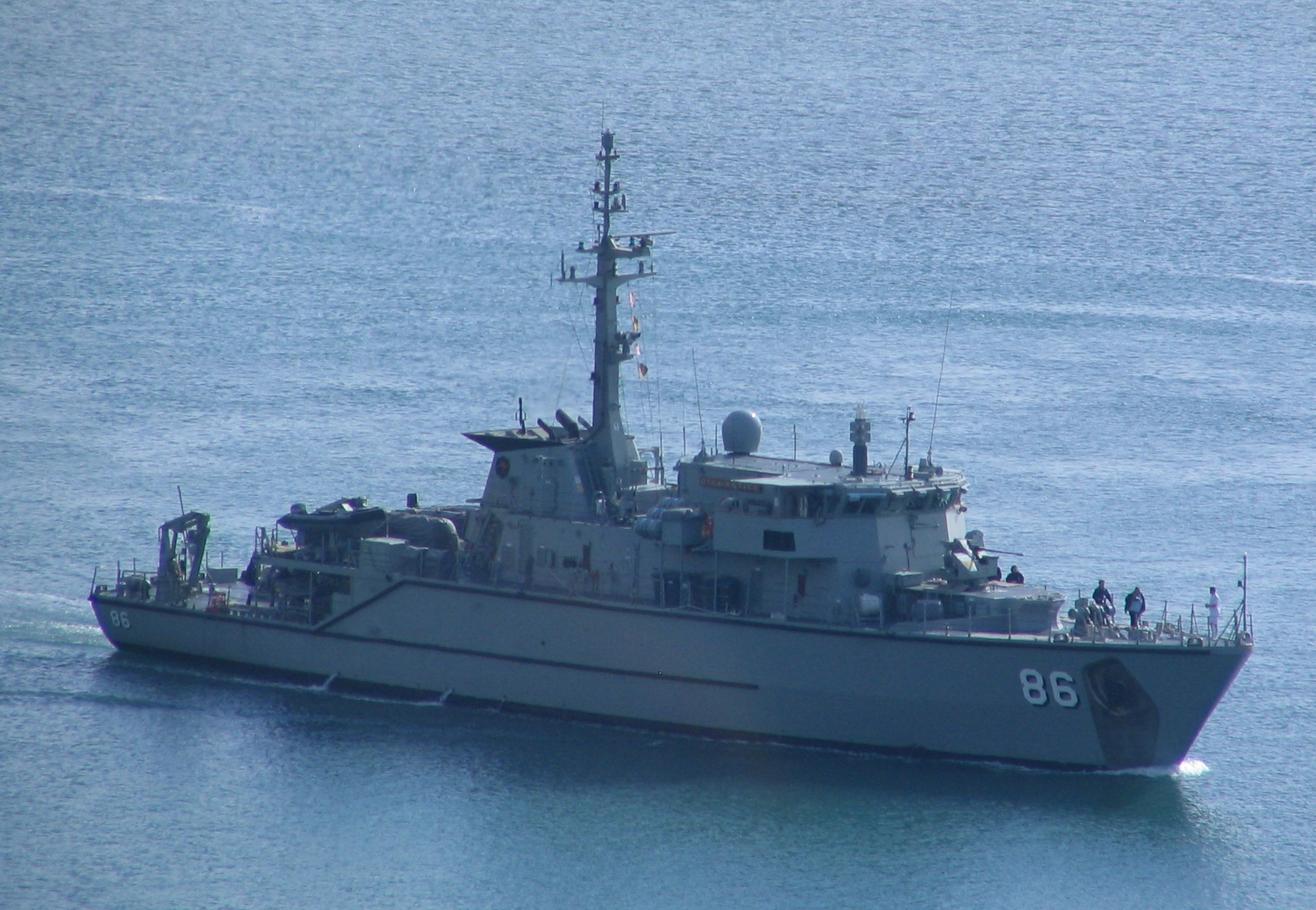
- HMAS Diamantina in 2009

History

Australia
- Name: Diamantina
- Namesake: Diamantina River
- Builder: Australian Defence Industries
- Laid down: 4 August 1998
- Launched: 2 December 2000
- Commissioned: 4 May 2002
- Home port: HMAS Waterhen
- Identification: MMSI number: 503125000
- Motto: "Whoever Leads Protects"
- Honours and awards: One inherited battle honour
- Status: Active as of 2016
- Badge

General characteristics
- Class & type: Huon-class minehunter
- Displacement: 732 tons at full load
- Length: 52.5 m (172 ft)
- Beam: 9.9 m (32 ft)
- Draught: 3 m (9.8 ft)
- Propulsion: 1 × Fincantieri GMT BL230-BN diesel motor, 1,985 bhp (1,480 kW), 1 × controllable-pitch propeller; 3 × 120 hp (89 kW) Riva Calzoni azimuth thrusters
- Speed: 14 knots (26 km/h; 16 mph) on diesel; 6 knots (11 km/h; 6.9 mph) on thrusters
- Range: 1,600 nautical miles (3,000 km; 1,800 mi) at 12 knots (22 km/h; 14 mph)
- Endurance: 19 days
- Complement: 6 officers and 34 sailors, plus up to 9 additional
- Sensors & processing systems: Kelvin-Hughes Type 1007 navigational radar; GEC-Marconi Type 2093M variable-depth minehunting sonar
- Electronic warfare & decoys: AWADI PRISM radar warning and direction-finding system; Radamec 1400N surveillance system; 2 × Wallop Super Barricade decoy launchers
- Armament: 1 × 30 mm DS30B rapid fire cannon; 2 × 0.50 calibre machine guns; 2 × SUTEC Double Eagle mine disposal vehicles

HMAS Diamantina (M 86), named after the Diamantina River, is a Huon-class minehunter currently serving in the Royal Australian Navy (RAN). Built by a joint partnership between Australian Defence Industries (ADI) and Intermarine SpA, Diamantina was constructed at ADI's Newcastle shipyard, and entered service in 2002.

== Design and construction ==
In 1993, the Department of Defence issued a request for tender for six coastal minehunters to replace the problematic Bay-class minehunters. The tender was awarded in August 1994 to Australian Defence Industries (ADI) and Intermarine SpA, which proposed a modified Gaeta-class minehunter.

Diamantina has a full load displacement of 732 tons, is 52.5 metres (172 ft) long, has a beam of 9.9 metres (32 ft), and a draught of 3 metres (9.8 ft). Main propulsion is a single Fincantieri GMT BL230-BN diesel motor, which provides 1,985 brake horsepower (1,480 kW) to a single controllable-pitch propeller, allowing the ship to reach 14 knots (26 km/h; 16 mph). Maximum range is 1,600 nautical miles (3,000 km; 1,800 mi) at 12 knots (22 km/h; 14 mph), and endurance is 19 days. The standard ship's company consists of 6 officers and 34 sailors, with accommodation for 9 additional (typically trainees or clearance divers). The main armament is a MSI DS30B 30 mm cannon, supplemented by two 0.50 calibre machine guns. The sensor suite includes a Kelvin-Hughes Type 1007 navigational radar, a GEC-Marconi Type 2093M variable-depth minehunting sonar, an AWADI PRISM radar warning and direction-finding system, and a Radamec 1400N surveillance system. Two Wallop Super Barricade decoy launchers are also fitted.

For minehunting operations, Diamantina uses three 120 horsepower (89 kW) Riva Calzoni azimuth thrusters to provide a maximum speed of 6 knots (11 km/h; 6.9 mph): two are located at the stern, while the third is sited behind the variable-depth sonar. Mines are located with the minehunting sonar, and can be disposed of by the vessel's two Double Eagle mine disposal vehicles, the Oropesa mechanical sweep, the Mini-Dyad magnetic influence sweep, or the towed AMASS influence sweep (which is not always carried). To prevent damage if a mine is detonated nearby, the ships were built with a glass-reinforced plastic, moulded in a single monocoque skin with no ribs or framework. As the ships often work with clearance divers, they are fitted with a small recompression chamber.

Diamantina was laid down by Australian Defence Industries at Newcastle, New South Wales on 4 August 1998, launched on 2 December 2000, and commissioned into the RAN on 4 May 2002.

== Operational history ==
On the morning of 13 March 2009, Diamantina was one of seventeen warships involved in a ceremonial fleet entry and fleet review in Sydney Harbour, the largest collection of RAN ships since the Australian Bicentenary in 1988. The minehunter was one of the thirteen ships involved in the ceremonial entry through Sydney Heads, and anchored in the harbour for the review.

In October 2013, Diamantina participated in the International Fleet Review 2013 in Sydney.

Diamantina suffered serious engine problems while patrolling the waters around Vanuatu in September 2021. These problems left her immobile at Port Vila until a repair team arrived from Australia.
