= HMAS Huon (M 82) =

Ship of the Huon-class of minehunters operated by the Royal Australian Navy

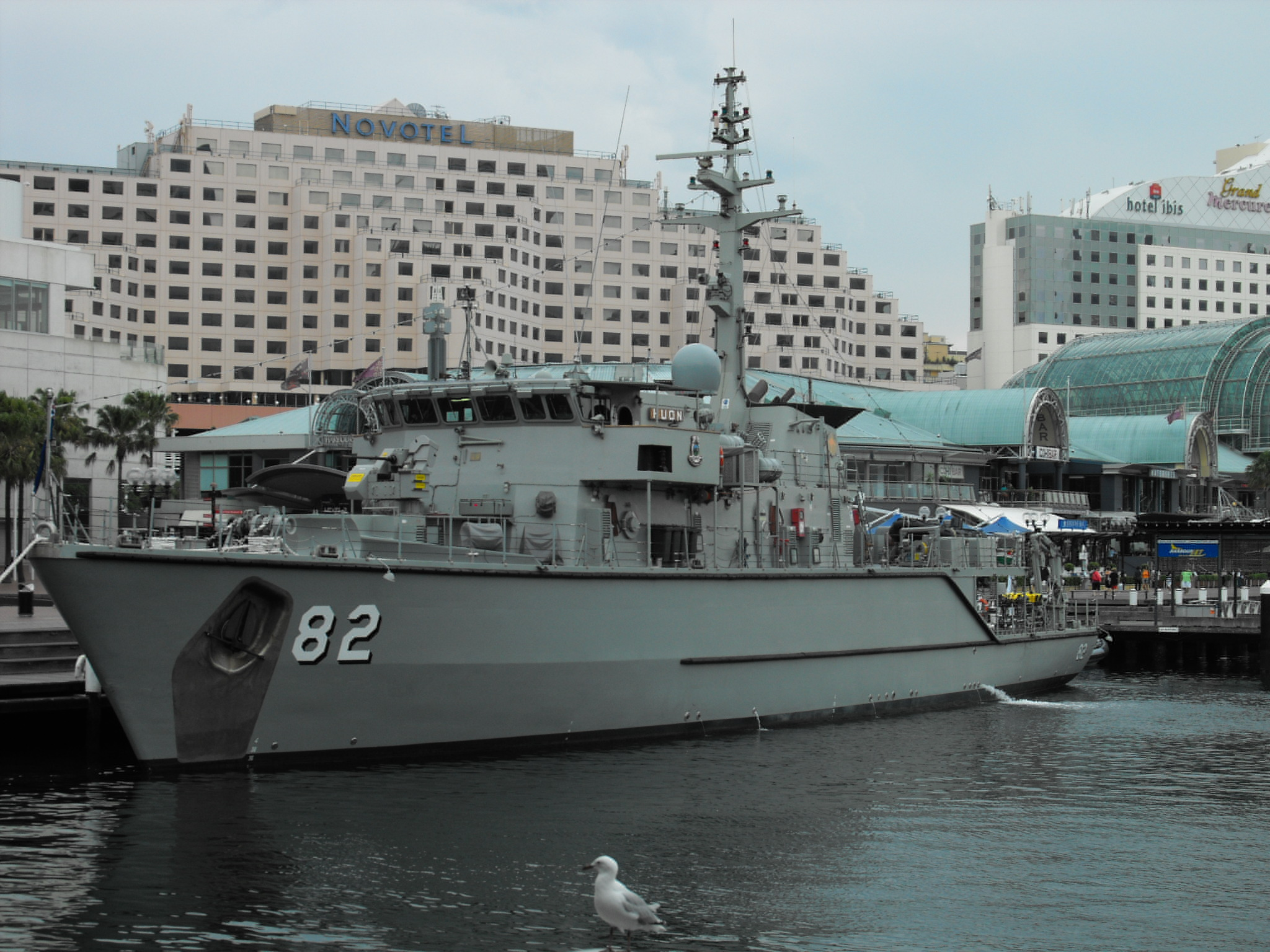
- HMAS Huon at Darling Harbour in January 2010

History

Australia
- Name: Huon
- Namesake: Huon River
- Builder: Australian Defence Industries
- Laid down: September 1994
- Launched: 25 July 1997
- Commissioned: 15 May 1999
- Decommissioned: 30 May 2024
- Home port: HMAS Waterhen, Sydney
- Identification: MMSI number: 503121000; Callsign: VLTC
- Motto: "Stand Fast"
- Honours and awards: One inherited battle honour
- Status: Decommissioned
- Badge

General characteristics
- Class & type: Huon-class minehunter
- Displacement: 732 tons at full load
- Length: 52.5 m (172 ft)
- Beam: 9.9 m (32 ft)
- Draught: 3 m (9.8 ft)
- Propulsion: 1 × Fincantieri GMT BL230-BN diesel motor, 1,985 bhp (1,480 kW), 1 × controllable-pitch propeller; 3 × 120 hp (89 kW) Riva Calzoni azimuth thrusters
- Speed: 14 knots (26 km/h; 16 mph) on diesel; 6 knots (11 km/h; 6.9 mph) on thrusters
- Range: 1,600 nautical miles (3,000 km; 1,800 mi) at 12 knots (22 km/h; 14 mph)
- Endurance: 19 days
- Complement: 6 officers and 34 sailors, plus up to 9 additional
- Sensors & processing systems: Kelvin-Hughes Type 1007 navigational radar; GEC-Marconi Type 2093M variable-depth minehunting sonar
- Electronic warfare & decoys: Nil
- Armament: 1 × 30 mm DS30B rapid fire cannon; 2 × 0.50 calibre machine guns; 2 × SUTEC Double Eagle mine disposal vehicles

HMAS Huon (M 82), named for the Huon River, was lead ship of the Huon class of minehunters operated by the Royal Australian Navy (RAN). The first of six ships built by a joint partnership of Australian Defence Industries (ADI) and Intermarine SpA, Huon's hull was fabricated at Intermarine's Italian shipyard, then freighted to ADI facilities at Newcastle for completion. She entered service in 1999, and was decommissioned on 30 May 2024.

The minehunter was temporarily deactivated for half of 2006, but reactivated for use as a border protection patrol boat, a role alternated with other members of the class. In 2011, Huon surveyed the waters around Brisbane following the 2010–11 Queensland floods. In 2013, Huon participated in the International Fleet Review, and became the first minor war vessel to receive the Gloucester Cup.

== Design and construction ==
In 1993, the Department of Defence issued a request for tender for six coastal minehunters to replace the problematic Bay-class minehunters. The tender was awarded in August 1994 to Australian Defence Industries (ADI) and Intermarine SpA, which proposed a modified Gaeta-class minehunter.

Huon has a full load displacement of 732 tons, is 52.5 metres (172 ft) long, has a beam of 9.9 metres (32 ft), and a draught of 3 metres (9.8 ft). Main propulsion is a single Fincantieri GMT BL230-BN diesel motor, which provides 1,985 brake horsepower (1,480 kW) to a single controllable-pitch propeller, allowing the ship to reach 14 knots (26 km/h; 16 mph). Maximum range is 1,600 nautical miles (3,000 km; 1,800 mi) at 12 knots (22 km/h; 14 mph), and endurance is 19 days. The standard ship's company consists of 6 officers and 34 sailors, with accommodation for 9 additional (typically trainees or clearance divers). The main armament is a MSI DS30B 30 mm cannon, supplemented by two 0.50 calibre machine guns. The sensor suite includes a Kelvin-Hughes Type 1007 navigational radar, a GEC-Marconi Type 2093M variable-depth minehunting sonar, an AWADI PRISM radar warning and direction-finding system, and a Radamec 1400N surveillance system. Two Wallop Super Barricade decoy launchers are also fitted.

For minehunting operations, Huon uses three 120 horsepower (89 kW) Riva Calzoni azimuth thrusters to provide a maximum speed of 6 knots (11 km/h; 6.9 mph): two are located at the stern, while the third is sited behind the variable-depth sonar. Mines are located with the minehunting sonar, and can be disposed of by the vessel's two Double Eagle mine disposal vehicles, the Oropesa mechanical sweep, the Mini-Dyad magnetic influence sweep, or the towed AMASS influence sweep (which is not always carried). To prevent damage if a mine is detonated nearby, the ships were built with a glass-reinforced plastic, moulded in a single monocoque skin with no ribs or framework. As the ships often work with clearance divers, they are fitted with a small recompression chamber.

Huon's hull was laid down during September 1994 at the Intermarine SpA Sarzana shipyard in Italy, and was transferred out to ADI's Newcastle facility as deck cargo, arriving on 31 August 1995. Completed in Newcastle, the ship was launched on 25 July 1997 and commissioned on 15 May 1999.

== Operational history ==
Following the 2003 Defence Capability Review, HMAS Huon and sister ship HMAS Hawkesbury were slated for deactivation. Huon was deactivated on 23 March 2006, with plans to preserve the minehunter for four years should the need to reactivate the vessel become apparent. Huon was reactivated in the second half of 2006 for use as a patrol boat. As of 2008, Huon and Hawkesbury were taking turns supporting border security operations.

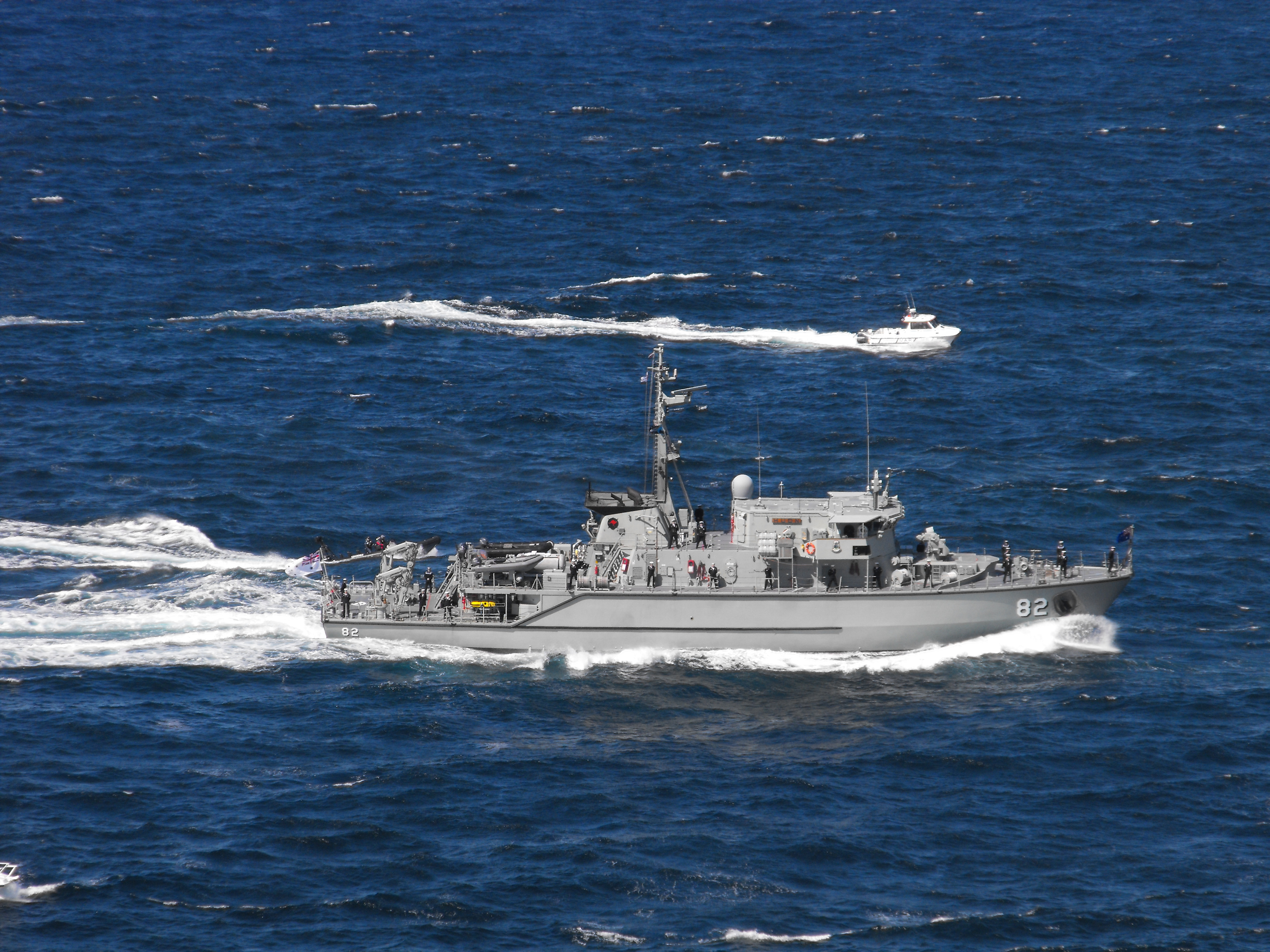
Huon in 2013

In January 2011, Huon was one of three RAN vessels deployed to survey Moreton Bay and the Brisbane River for submerged debris as part of Operation Queensland Flood Assist, the Australian Defence Force response to the 2010–11 Queensland floods.

In October 2013, Huon participated in the International Fleet Review 2013 in Sydney. The ship was presented the Gloucester Cup for "excelling above all others [RAN warships] throughout 2013 in operations, safety, seamanship, reliability and training" on 30 April 2014, becoming the first minor warship to receive this award.

On 30 May 2024, Huon was decommissioned and does not have a direct replacement.
