= HMAS Norman (M 84) =

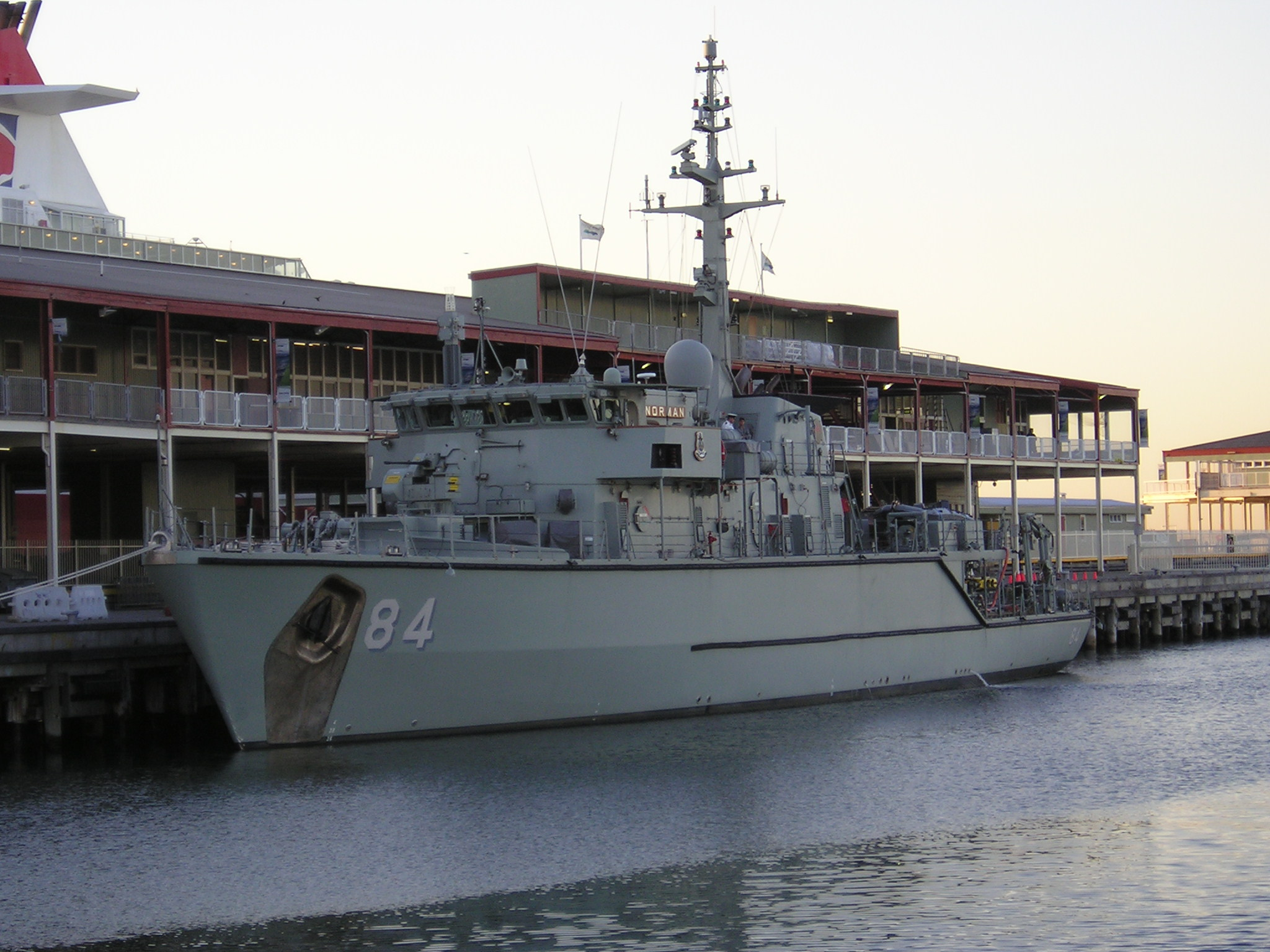
- HMAS Norman at Station Pier, Melbourne

History

Australia
- Name: Norman
- Namesake: Norman River
- Builder: Australian Defence Industries
- Launched: 3 May 1999
- Commissioned: 26 August 2000
- Decommissioned: 31 October 2018
- Home port: HMAS Waterhen
- Motto: "No Surrender"
- Honours and awards: Four inherited battle honours
- Status: Disposed November 2024
- Badge

General characteristics
- Class & type: Huon-class minehunter
- Displacement: 732 tons at full load
- Length: 52.5 m (172 ft)
- Beam: 9.9 m (32 ft)
- Draught: 3 m (9.8 ft)
- Propulsion: 1 × Fincantieri GMT BL230-BN diesel motor, 1,985 bhp (1,480 kW), 1 × controllable-pitch propeller; 3 × 120 hp (89 kW) Riva Calzoni azimuth thrusters
- Speed: 14 knots (26 km/h; 16 mph) on diesel; 6 knots (11 km/h; 6.9 mph) on thrusters
- Range: 1,600 nautical miles (3,000 km; 1,800 mi) at 12 knots (22 km/h; 14 mph)
- Endurance: 19 days
- Complement: 6 officers and 34 sailors, plus up to 9 additional
- Sensors & processing systems: Kelvin-Hughes Type 1007 navigational radar; GEC-Marconi Type 2093M variable-depth minehunting sonar
- Electronic warfare & decoys: AWADI PRISM radar warning and direction-finding system; Radamec 1400N surveillance system; 2 × Wallop Super Barricade decoy launchers
- Armament: 1 × 30 mm DS30B rapid fire cannon; 2 × 0.50 calibre machine guns; 2 × SUTEC Double Eagle mine disposal vehicles

HMAS Norman (M 84), named for the Norman River in Queensland, is the third Huon-class minehunter to serve in the Royal Australian Navy (RAN). Built by a joint partnership between Australian Defence Industries (ADI) and Intermarine SpA, Norman was constructed at ADI's Newcastle shipyard, and entered service in 2000.

Although still commissioned as of 2016 and considered a part of the RAN fleet, Norman is one of two minehunters that have been in reserve since 2011, due to personnel shortages. Sold in November 2024 to be converted to a superyacht.

== Design and construction ==
In 1993, the Department of Defence issued a request for tender for six coastal minehunters to replace the problematic Bay-class minehunters. The tender was awarded in August 1994 to Australian Defence Industries (ADI) and Intermarine SpA, which proposed a modified Gaeta-class minehunter.

Norman has a full load displacement of 732 tons, is 52.5 metres (172 ft) long, has a beam of 9.9 metres (32 ft), and a draught of 3 metres (9.8 ft). Main propulsion is a single Fincantieri GMT BL230-BN diesel motor, which provides 1,985 brake horsepower (1,480 kW) to a single controllable-pitch propeller, allowing the ship to reach 14 knots (26 km/h; 16 mph). Maximum range is 1,600 nautical miles (3,000 km; 1,800 mi) at 12 knots (22 km/h; 14 mph), and endurance is 19 days. The standard ship's company consists of 6 officers and 34 sailors, with accommodation for 9 additional (typically trainees or clearance divers). The main armament is a MSI DS30B 30 mm cannon, supplemented by two 0.50 calibre machine guns. The sensor suite includes a Kelvin-Hughes Type 1007 navigational radar, a GEC-Marconi Type 2093M variable-depth minehunting sonar, an AWADI PRISM radar warning and direction-finding system, and a Radamec 1400N surveillance system. Two Wallop Super Barricade decoy launchers are also fitted.

For minehunting operations, Norman uses three 120 horsepower (89 kW) Riva Calzoni azimuth thrusters to provide a maximum speed of 6 knots (11 km/h; 6.9 mph): two are located at the stern, while the third is sited behind the variable-depth sonar. Mines are located with the minehunting sonar, and can be disposed of by the vessel's two Double Eagle mine disposal vehicles, the Oropesa mechanical sweep, the Mini-Dyad magnetic influence sweep, or the towed AMASS influence sweep (which is not always carried). To prevent damage if a mine is detonated nearby, the ships were built with a glass-reinforced plastic, moulded in a single monocoque skin with no ribs or framework. As the ships often work with clearance divers, they are fitted with a small recompression chamber.

Norman was built by Australian Defence Industries in Newcastle, New South Wales. She was launched 3 May 1999, and commissioned into the RAN on 26 August 2000. Norman was based at HMAS Waterhen in Sydney, with the majority of the RAN's mine warfare assets.

== Operational history ==
On the morning of 13 March 2009, Norman was one of seventeen warships involved in a ceremonial fleet entry and fleet review in Sydney Harbour, the largest collection of RAN ships since the Australian Bicentenary in 1988. The minehunter was one of the thirteen ships involved in the ceremonial entry through Sydney Heads, and anchored in the harbour for the review.

By October 2011, Norman and sister ship Hawkesbury had been placed into reserve; the Department of Defence predicted that it would take five years to bring both back to operational status and train enough personnel to run all six vessels.

HMAS Norman was decommissioned in Sydney on 31 October 2018 and in November 2018 the vessel was advertised for sale and eventually sold in November 2024 to be converted to a superyacht
