= HMAS Gascoyne (M 85) =

Huon-class minehunter of the Royal Australian Navy

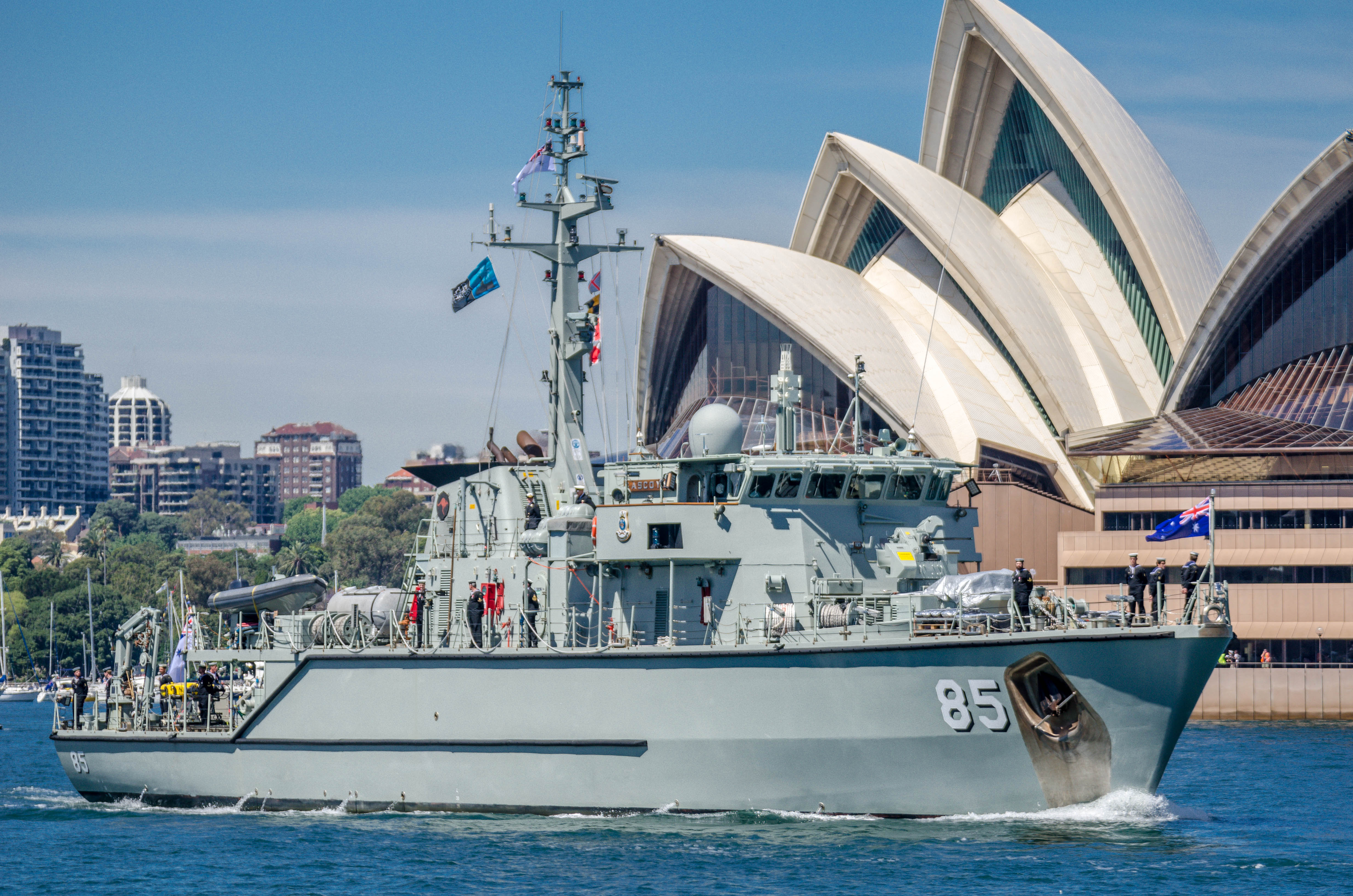
- HMAS Gascoyne during the International Fleet Review 2013

History

Australia
- Name: Gascoyne
- Namesake: Gascoyne River
- Builder: Australian Defence Industries
- Launched: 11 March 2000
- Commissioned: 2 June 2001
- Decommissioned: 5 December 2024
- Home port: HMAS Waterhen
- Identification: MMSI number: 503124000
- Motto: "Return to the Sea"
- Honours and awards: Five inherited battle honours
- Badge

General characteristics
- Class & type: Huon-class minehunter
- Displacement: 732 tons at full load
- Length: 52.5 m (172 ft)
- Beam: 9.9 m (32 ft)
- Draught: 3 m (9.8 ft)
- Propulsion: 1 × Fincantieri GMT BL230-BN diesel motor, 1,985 bhp (1,480 kW), 1 × controllable-pitch propeller; 3 × 120 hp (89 kW) Riva Calzoni azimuth thrusters
- Speed: 14 knots (26 km/h; 16 mph) on diesel; 6 knots (11 km/h; 6.9 mph) on thrusters
- Range: 1,600 nautical miles (3,000 km; 1,800 mi) at 12 knots (22 km/h; 14 mph)
- Endurance: 19 days
- Complement: 6 officers and 34 sailors, plus up to 9 additional
- Sensors & processing systems: Kelvin-Hughes Type 1007 navigational radar; GEC-Marconi Type 2093M variable-depth minehunting sonar
- Electronic warfare & decoys: AWADI PRISM radar warning and direction-finding system; Radamec 1400N surveillance system; 2 × Wallop Super Barricade decoy launchers
- Armament: 1 × 30 mm DS30B rapid fire cannon; 2 × 0.50 calibre machine guns; 2 × SUTEC Double Eagle mine disposal vehicles

HMAS Gascoyne (M 85), named after the Gascoyne River, was the fourth of six Huon-class minehunters built for the Royal Australian Navy (RAN) and remained in service until 2024. Built by a joint partnership between Australian Defence Industries (ADI) and Intermarine SpA, Gascoyne was constructed at ADI's Newcastle shipyard, and entered service in 2001.

== Design and construction ==
In 1993, the Department of Defence issued a request for tender for six coastal minehunters to replace the problematic Bay-class minehunters. The tender was awarded in August 1994 to Australian Defence Industries (ADI) and Intermarine SpA, which proposed a modified Gaeta-class minehunter.

Gascoyne has a full load displacement of 732 tons, is 52.5 metres (172 ft) long, has a beam of 9.9 metres (32 ft), and a draught of 3 metres (9.8 ft). Main propulsion is a single Fincantieri GMT BL230-BN diesel motor, which provides 1,985 brake horsepower (1,480 kW) to a single controllable-pitch propeller, allowing the ship to reach 14 knots (26 km/h; 16 mph). Maximum range is 1,600 nautical miles (3,000 km; 1,800 mi) at 12 knots (22 km/h; 14 mph), and endurance is 19 days. The standard ship's company consists of 6 officers and 34 sailors, with accommodation for 9 additional (typically trainees or clearance divers). The main armament is a MSI DS30B 30 mm cannon, supplemented by two 0.50 calibre machine guns. The sensor suite includes a Kelvin-Hughes Type 1007 navigational radar, a GEC-Marconi Type 2093M variable-depth minehunting sonar, an AWADI PRISM radar warning and direction-finding system, and a Radamec 1400N surveillance system. Two Wallop Super Barricade decoy launchers are also fitted.

For minehunting operations, Gascoyne uses three 120 horsepower (89 kW) Riva Calzoni azimuth thrusters to provide a maximum speed of 6 knots (11 km/h; 6.9 mph): two are located at the stern, while the third is sited behind the variable-depth sonar. Mines are located with the minehunting sonar, and can be disposed of by the vessel's two Double Eagle mine disposal vehicles, the Oropesa mechanical sweep, the Mini-Dyad magnetic influence sweep, or the towed AMASS influence sweep (which is not always carried). To prevent damage if a mine is detonated nearby, the ships were built with a glass-reinforced plastic, moulded in a single monocoque skin with no ribs or framework. As the ships often work with clearance divers, they are fitted with a small recompression chamber.

Constructed by Australian Defence Industries, Gascoyne was launched on 11 March 2000, and commissioned on 2 June 2001.

== Operational history ==
On the morning of 13 March 2009, Gascoyne was one of seventeen warships involved in a ceremonial fleet entry and fleet review in Sydney Harbour, the largest collection of RAN ships since the Australian Bicentenary in 1988. The minehunter was one of the thirteen ships involved in the ceremonial entry through Sydney Heads, and anchored in the harbour for the review.

In October 2013, Gascoyne participated in the International Fleet Review 2013 in Sydney.

In October 2024, Gascoyne participated in the 2024 Fleet Review in Sydney.

Gascoyne was decommissioned at HMAS Waterhen, Sydney on 5 December 2024.
