= HMAS Hawkesbury (M 83) =

1998 Huon-class minehunter

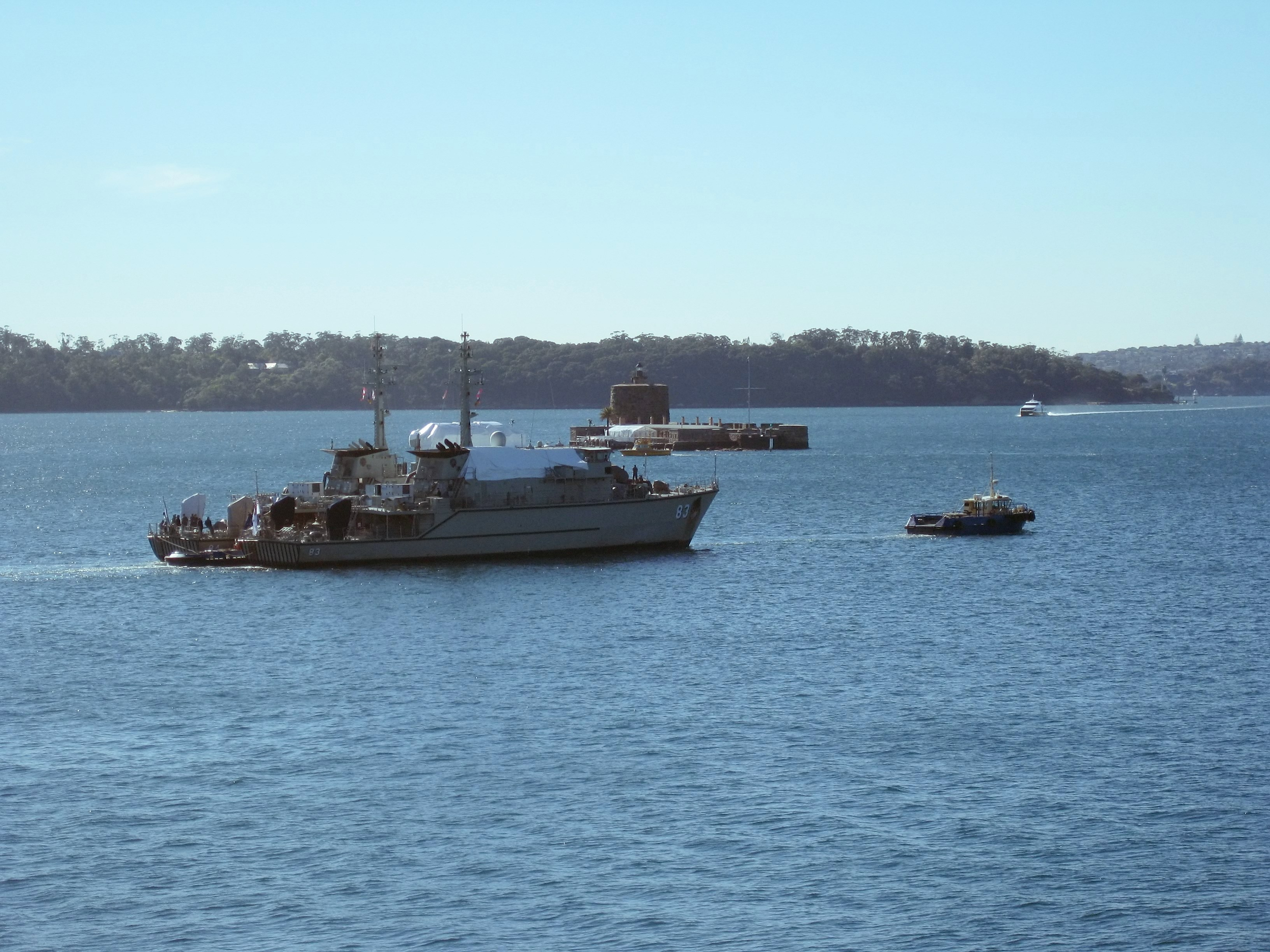
- HMAS Hawkesbury and sister ship HMAS Norman under tow in 2010

History

Australia
- Name: Hawkesbury
- Namesake: Hawkesbury River
- Builder: Australian Defence Industries
- Launched: 24 April 1998
- Commissioned: 12 February 2000
- Home port: HMAS Waterhen
- Motto: "Equality not servitude"
- Status: Disposed
- Badge

General characteristics
- Class & type: Huon-class minehunter
- Displacement: 732 tons at full load
- Length: 52.5 m (172 ft)
- Beam: 9.9 m (32 ft)
- Draught: 3 m (9.8 ft)
- Propulsion: 1 × Fincantieri GMT BL230-BN diesel motor, 1,985 bhp (1,480 kW), 1 × controllable-pitch propeller; 3 × 120 hp (89 kW) Riva Calzoni azimuth thrusters
- Speed: 14 knots (26 km/h; 16 mph) on diesel; 6 knots (11 km/h; 6.9 mph) on thrusters
- Range: 1,600 nautical miles (3,000 km; 1,800 mi) at 12 knots (22 km/h; 14 mph)
- Endurance: 19 days
- Complement: 6 officers and 34 sailors, plus up to 9 additional
- Sensors & processing systems: Kelvin-Hughes Type 1007 navigational radar; GEC-Marconi Type 2093M variable-depth minehunting sonar
- Electronic warfare & decoys: AWADI PRISM radar warning and direction-finding system; Radamec 1400N surveillance system; 2 × Wallop Super Barricade decoy launchers
- Armament: 1 × 30 mm DS30B rapid fire cannon; 2 × 0.50 calibre machine guns; 2 × SUTEC Double Eagle mine disposal vehicles

HMAS Hawkesbury (M 83), named for the Hawkesbury River, is the second Huon-class minehunter to have been built for the Royal Australian Navy (RAN). Built by a joint partnership between Australian Defence Industries (ADI) and Intermarine SpA, Hawkesbury was constructed at ADI's Newcastle shipyard, and entered service in 2000.

The minehunter was active throughout the 2000s, and in addition to minehunting and training exercises, was one of several ships used to disprove the false wreck site of the hospital ship Centaur, was rotated onto border protection duties on several occasions, and participated in a formal fleet review. Although still commissioned as of 2016 and considered a part of the RAN fleet, Hawkesbury is one of two minehunters that was in reserve after 2011, due to personnel shortages. Sold in November 2024 to be converted to a superyacht

== Design and construction ==
In 1993, the Department of Defence issued a request for tender for six coastal minehunters to replace the problematic Bay-class minehunters. The tender was awarded in August 1994 to Australian Defence Industries (ADI) and Intermarine SpA, which proposed a modified Gaeta-class minehunter.

Hawkesbury has a full load displacement of 732 tons, is 52.5 metres (172 ft) long, has a beam of 9.9 metres (32 ft), and a draught of 3 metres (9.8 ft). The ship's main source of propulsion is a single Fincantieri GMT BL230-BN diesel motor, which provides 1,985 brake horsepower (1,480 kW) to a single controllable-pitch propeller, allowing the ship to reach 14 knots (26 km/h; 16 mph). It has a maximum range of 1,600 nautical miles (3,000 km; 1,800 mi) at 12 knots (22 km/h; 14 mph), and is able to stay at sea for 19 days. The standard ship's company consists of six officers and 34 sailors, with accommodation for nine additional personnel who are typically trainees or clearance divers. The vessel's main armament is a MSI DS30B 30 mm cannon, which is supplemented by two 0.50 calibre machine guns. Its sensor suite includes a Kelvin-Hughes Type 1007 navigational radar, a GEC-Marconi Type 2093M variable-depth minehunting sonar, an AWADI PRISM radar warning and direction-finding system, and a Radamec 1400N surveillance system. Two Wallop Super Barricade decoy launchers are also fitted.

For minehunting operations, Hawkesbury uses three 120 horsepower (89 kW) Riva Calzoni azimuth thrusters to provide a maximum speed of 6 knots (11 km/h; 6.9 mph): two are located at the stern, while the third is sited behind the variable-depth sonar. Mines are located with the minehunting sonar, and can be disposed of by the vessel's two Double Eagle mine disposal vehicles, the Oropesa mechanical sweep, the Mini-Dyad magnetic influence sweep, or the towed AMASS influence sweep (which is not always carried). To prevent damage if a mine is detonated nearby, the ships were built with a glass-reinforced plastic, moulded in a single monocoque skin with no ribs or framework. As the ships often work with clearance divers, they are fitted with a small recompression chamber.

Hawkesbury was built by Australian Defence Industries in Newcastle, New South Wales, launched on 24 April 1998, and commissioned into the RAN on 12 February 2000. Hawkesbury is based at Sydney naval base HMAS Waterhen, along with the majority of the RAN's mine warfare assets.

== Operational history ==
In May 2003, Hawkesbury and sister ship HMAS Yarra were operating off the coast of Queensland on exercises. During this, the two ships were tasked with checking the believed location of the shipwreck of AHS Centaur, a hospital ship sunk off Moreton Island during World War II, following several media stories indicating that the wreck at this location might not be the hospital ship. These searches, followed up by the hydrographic survey ship HMAS Melville a month later, found that the wreck had been incorrectly marked as Centaur when it had been discovered in 1995.

As of 2008, Hawkesbury and sister ship HMAS Huon were taking turns supporting border security operations.

On the morning of 13 March 2009, Hawkesbury was one of seventeen warships involved in a ceremonial fleet entry and fleet review in Sydney Harbour, the largest collection of RAN ships since the Australian Bicentenary in 1988. The minehunter did not participate in the fleet entry, but was anchored in the harbour for the review.

By October 2011, Hawkesbury and sister ship HMAS Norman had been placed into reserve, and the Australian Department of Defence predicted that it would take five years to bring both back to operational status and train personnel to run the vessels.

In November 2018 the vessel was advertised for sale and eventually sold in November 2024 to be converted to a superyacht
