= HMAS Yarra (M 87) =

Australian warship

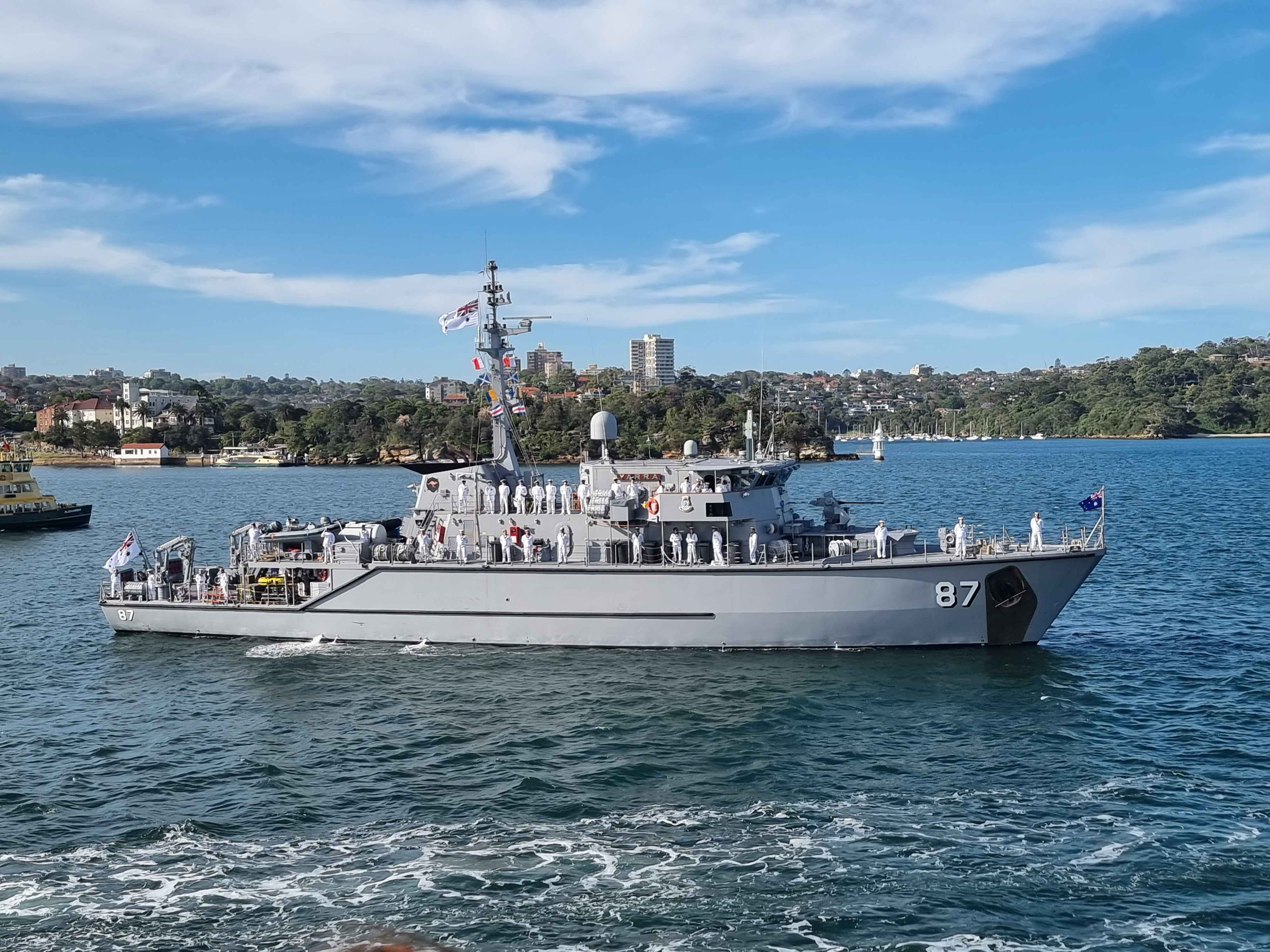
- HMAS Yarra in 2024 during the Royal Fleet Review

History

Australia
- Name: Yarra
- Namesake: Yarra River
- Builder: Australian Defence Industries
- Launched: 19 January 2002
- Commissioned: 1 March 2003
- Home port: HMAS Waterhen
- Identification: MMSI number: 503126000
- Motto: "Hunt and strike"
- Honours and awards: Five inherited battle honours
- Status: Active as of 2016
- Badge

General characteristics
- Class & type: Huon-class minehunter
- Displacement: 732 tons at full load
- Length: 52.5 m (172 ft)
- Beam: 9.9 m (32 ft)
- Draught: 3 m (9.8 ft)
- Propulsion: 1 × Fincantieri GMT BL230-BN diesel motor, 1,985 bhp (1,480 kW), 1 × controllable-pitch propeller; 3 × 120 hp (89 kW) Riva Calzoni azimuth thrusters
- Speed: 14 knots (26 km/h; 16 mph) on diesel; 6 knots (11 km/h; 6.9 mph) on thrusters
- Range: 1,600 nautical miles (3,000 km; 1,800 mi) at 12 knots (22 km/h; 14 mph)
- Endurance: 19 days
- Complement: 6 officers and 34 sailors, plus up to 9 additional
- Sensors & processing systems: Kelvin-Hughes Type 1007 navigational radar; GEC-Marconi Type 2093M variable-depth minehunting sonar
- Electronic warfare & decoys: AWADI PRISM radar warning and direction-finding system; Radamec 1400N surveillance system; 2 × Wallop Super Barricade decoy launchers
- Armament: 1 × 30 mm DS30B rapid fire cannon; 2 × 0.50 calibre machine guns; 2 × SUTEC Double Eagle mine disposal vehicles

HMAS Yarra (M 87) is the sixth Huon-class minehunter to have been built for the Royal Australian Navy (RAN) and the fourth warship to be named after the Yarra River in Victoria. Built by a joint partnership between Australian Defence Industries (ADI) and Intermarine SpA, Yarra was constructed at ADI's Newcastle shipyard, and entered service in 2003.

== Design and construction ==
In 1993, the Department of Defence issued a request for tender for six coastal minehunters to replace the problematic Bay-class minehunters. The tender was awarded in August 1994 to Australian Defence Industries (ADI) and Intermarine SpA, which proposed a modified Gaeta-class minehunter.

Yarra has a full load displacement of 732 tons, is 52.5 metres (172 ft) long, has a beam of 9.9 metres (32 ft), and a draught of 3 metres (9.8 ft). Main propulsion is a single Fincantieri GMT BL230-BN diesel motor, which provides 1,985 brake horsepower (1,480 kW) to a single controllable-pitch propeller, allowing the ship to reach 14 knots (26 km/h; 16 mph). Maximum range is 1,600 nautical miles (3,000 km; 1,800 mi) at 12 knots (22 km/h; 14 mph), and endurance is 19 days. The standard ship's company consists of 6 officers and 34 sailors, with accommodation for 9 additional (typically trainees or clearance divers). The main armament is a MSI DS30B 30 mm cannon, supplemented by two 0.50 calibre machine guns. The sensor suite includes a Kelvin-Hughes Type 1007 navigational radar, a GEC-Marconi Type 2093M variable-depth minehunting sonar, an AWADI PRISM radar warning and direction-finding system, and a Radamec 1400N surveillance system. Two Wallop Super Barricade decoy launchers are also fitted.

For minehunting operations, Yarra uses three 120 horsepower (89 kW) Riva Calzoni azimuth thrusters to provide a maximum speed of 6 knots (11 km/h; 6.9 mph): two are located at the stern, while the third is sited behind the variable-depth sonar. Mines are located with the minehunting sonar, and can be disposed of by the vessel's two Double Eagle mine disposal vehicles, the Oropesa mechanical sweep, the Mini-Dyad magnetic influence sweep, or the towed AMASS influence sweep (which is not always carried). To prevent damage if a mine is detonated nearby, the ships were built with a glass-reinforced plastic, molded in a single monocoque skin with no ribs or framework. As the ships often work with clearance divers, they are fitted with a small recompression chamber.

Yarra was built by Australian Defence Industries in Newcastle, New South Wales, launched on 19 January 2002, and commissioned into the RAN on 1 March 2003. Yarra is based at HMAS Waterhen in Sydney, along with the majority of the RAN's mine warfare assets.

== Operational history ==
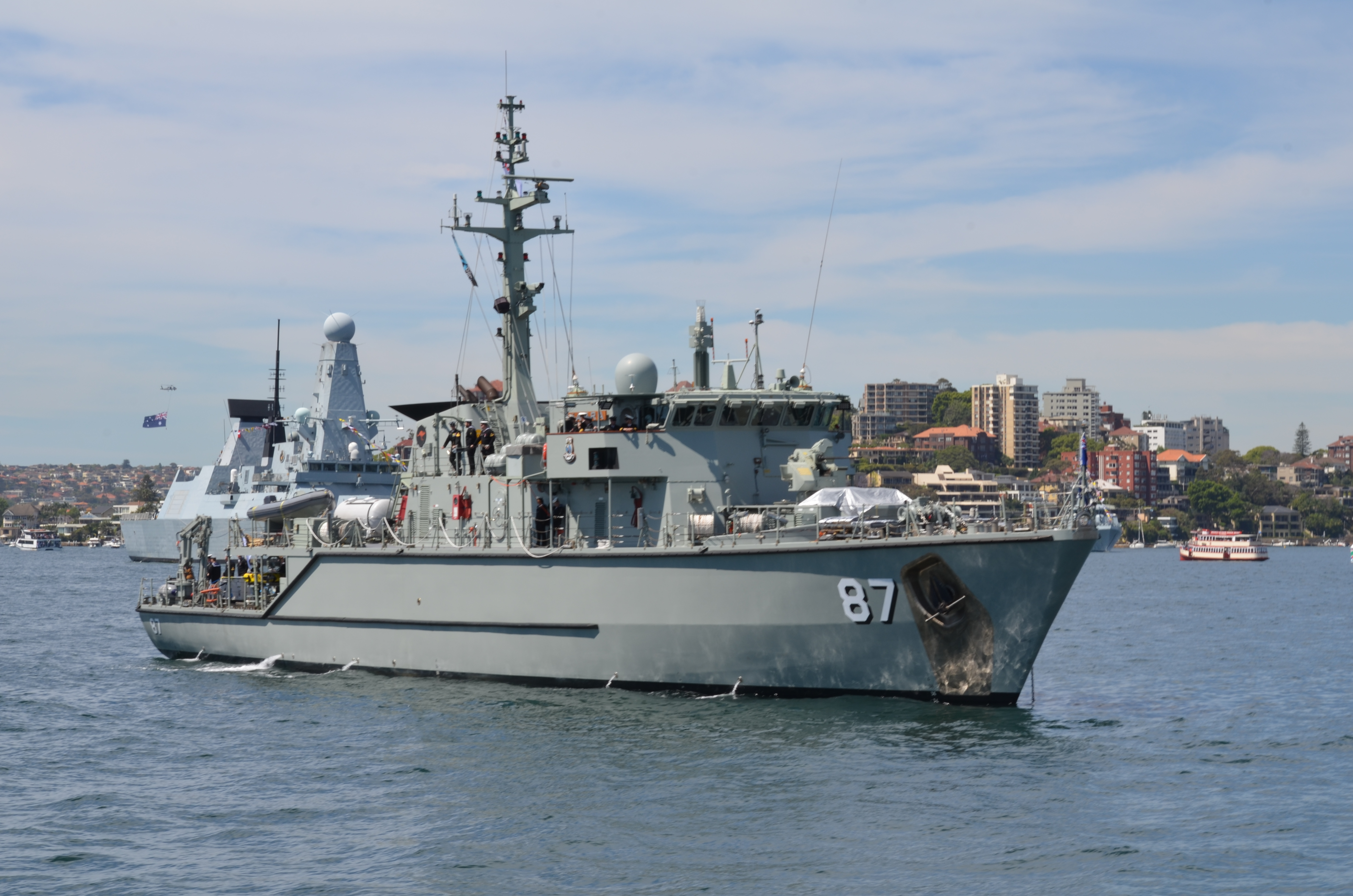
HMAS Yarra in 2013

In May 2003, Yarra and sister ship Hawkesbury were operating off the coast of Queensland on exercises. During this, the two ships were tasked with checking the believed location of the shipwreck of AHS Centaur, a hospital ship sunk off Moreton Island during World War II, following several media stories indicating that the wreck at this location might not be the hospital ship. These searches, followed up by the hydrographic survey ship HMAS Melville a month later, found that the wreck had been incorrectly marked as Centaur since its discovery in 1995.

Following the discovery by the survey ships Benalla, and Shepparton, of a submerged object that corresponded to the dimensions of Australian submarine AE1, which had disappeared off the coast of East New Britain during World War I, Yarra was sent in June 2007 to confirm the findings. The object was found to be a submarine-shaped rock formation.

On the morning of 13 March 2009, Yarra was one of seventeen warships involved in a ceremonial fleet entry and fleet review in Sydney Harbour, the largest collection of RAN ships since the Australian Bicentenary in 1988. The minehunter was one of the thirteen ships involved in the ceremonial entry through Sydney Heads, and anchored in the harbour for the review.

In October 2013, Yarra participated in the International Fleet Review 2013 in Sydney.
