= Huon-class minehunter =

Class of Royal Australian Navy minehunters

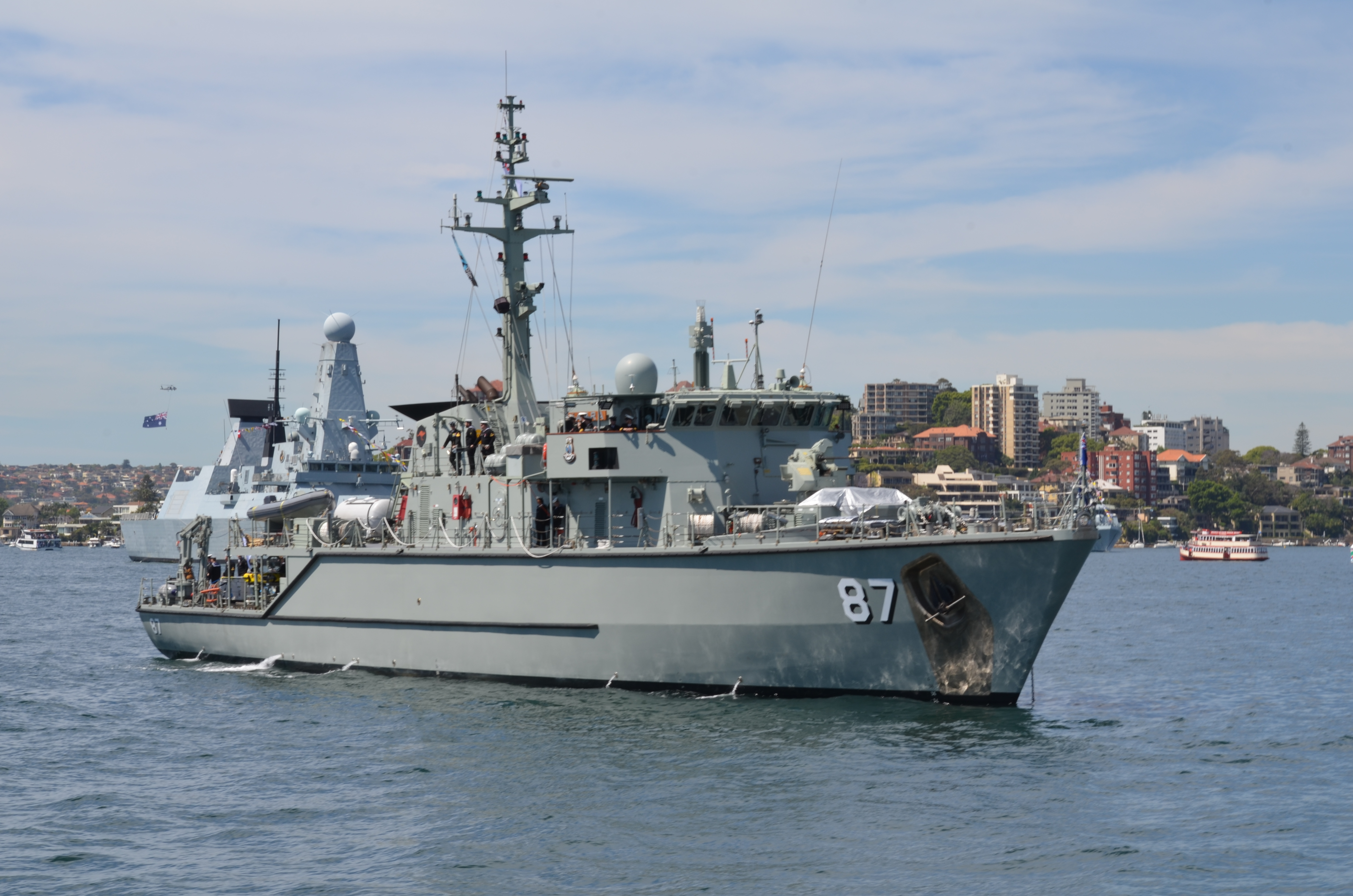
- HMAS Yarra in 2013

Class overview
- Builders: Australian Defence Industries
- Operators: Royal Australian Navy
- Preceded by: Ton-class minesweeper; Bay-class minehunter
- Built: 1994–2003
- In commission: 1999–present
- Completed: 6
- Active: 2
- Retired: 4

General characteristics
- Type: Minehunter Coastal
- Displacement: 732 tons at full load
- Length: 52.5 m (172 ft)
- Beam: 9.9 m (32 ft)
- Draught: 3 m (9.8 ft)
- Propulsion: 1 × Fincantieri GMT BL230-BN diesel motor, 1,985 bhp (1,480 kW), 1 x controllable-pitch propeller; 3 × 120 hp (89 kW) Riva Calzoni azimuth thrusters with Combimac low magnetic electric motors
- Speed: 14 knots (26 km/h; 16 mph) on diesel; 6 knots (11 km/h; 6.9 mph) on thrusters
- Range: 1,600 nautical miles (3,000 km; 1,800 mi) at 12 knots (22 km/h; 14 mph)
- Endurance: 19 days
- Complement: 6 officers and 34 sailors, plus up to 9 additional
- Sensors & processing systems: Kelvin-Hughes Type 1007 navigational radar; GEC-Marconi Type 2093M variable-depth minehunting sonar
- Electronic warfare & decoys: AWADI PRISM radar warning and direction-finding system; Radamec 1400N surveillance system; 2 × Wallop Super Barricade decoy launchers (removed 2010)
- Armament: 1 × 30 mm DS30B rapid fire cannon; 2 × 0.50 calibre machine guns; 2 × SUTEC Double Eagle mine disposal vehicles

The Huon-class minehunter coastal (MHC) ships are a group of minehunters built for the Royal Australian Navy (RAN). Following problems with the Bay-class minehunters, a request for tender was issued in 1993 for a class of six coastal minehunters under the project designation SEA 1555. The tender was awarded in 1994 to the partnership of Australian Defence Industries (ADI) and Intermarine SpA, which was offering a variant of the Italian Gaeta-class minehunter.

Five of the six ships were constructed completely in Newcastle, New South Wales, while the hull of the first ship was built in Italy, then transported to Australia for fitting out. Construction ran from 1994 to 2003, with lead ship HMAS Huon entering service in 1999. All six vessels are based at HMAS Waterhen, in Sydney. In 2006, following a capability review three years prior, one minehunter was placed in reserve, while another was marked for transfer to reserve status; this instruction was reversed prior to 2008, and the two vessels were tasked with supporting border protection operations. Two of the minehunters were decommissioned in 2018.

== Development and tendering ==
In 1993, the Department of Defence issued a request for tender for six coastal minehunters to replace the problematic Bay-class minehunters, of which four had been cancelled after the first two demonstrated problems with their sonar array and seakeeping capability. According to an article in Jane's International Defence Review published just before the tender was opened, three joint ventures between an Australian and a European company were expected to submit designs: Australian Defence Industries (ADI) and Intermarine SpA with the Gaeta class, Australian Submarine Corporation and Karlskronavarvet (later Kockums) with a lengthened version of the Landsort class, and AMECON and Vosper Thornycroft with the Sandown class. According to the request for tender, the designs had to be modified to operate in Australian conditions, and at least 60% of each ship and her equipment had to be of Australian manufacture. On 12 August 1994, Project SEA 1555 was awarded to ADI.

== Design and construction ==
The design of the Huon class is based on the Italian Lerici class; specifically the second run of eight ships known as the Gaeta class. Each ship has a full load displacement of 732 tons (slightly greater than the Gaetas), is 52.5 metres (172 ft) long, has a beam of 9.9 metres (32 ft), and a draught of 3 metres (9.8 ft). The minehunters' main propulsion system is a single Fincantieri GMT BL230-BN diesel motor, which provides 1,985 brake horsepower (1,480 kW) to a single controllable-pitch propeller, allowing the ship to reach 14 knots (26 km/h; 16 mph). Maximum range is 1,600 nautical miles (3,000 km; 1,800 mi) at 12 knots (22 km/h; 14 mph), and the vessels have an endurance of 19 days. The standard ship's company consists of 6 officers and 34 sailors, with accommodation for 9 additional (typically trainees or clearance divers). The main armament on a Huon-class vessel is a MSI DS30B 30 mm cannon; this is supplemented by two 0.50 calibre machine guns. The sensor suite includes a Kelvin-Hughes Type 1007 navigational radar, a GEC-Marconi Type 2093M variable-depth minehunting sonar, an AWADI PRISM radar warning and direction-finding system, and a Radamec 1400N surveillance system. Two Wallop Super Barricade decoy launchers are also fitted.

For minehunting operations, the Huons use three 120 horsepower (89 kW) Riva Calzoni azimuth thrusters to provide a maximum speed of 6 knots (11 km/h; 6.9 mph): two are located at the stern, while the third is sited behind the variable-depth sonar. Mines are located with the minehunting sonar, and can be disposed of by the vessel's two Double Eagle mine disposal vehicles, the Oropesa mechanical sweep, the Mini-Dyad magnetic influence sweep, or the towed AMASS influence sweep (which is not always carried). To prevent damage in the event a Huon-class ship triggers a mine, the ships were built with a glass-reinforced plastic, moulded in a single monocoque skin with no ribs or framework. As the ships often work with clearance divers, they are fitted with a small recompression chamber.

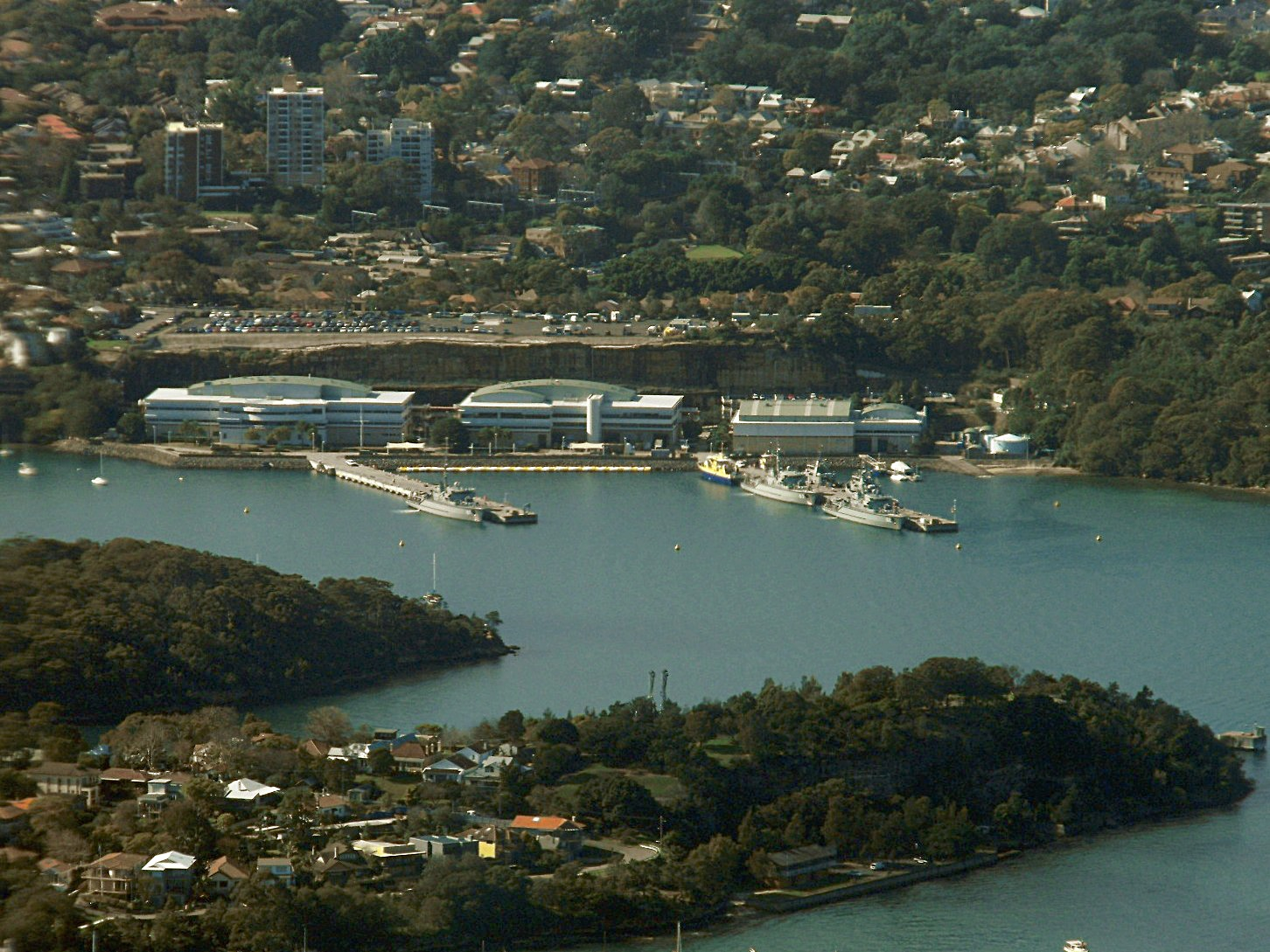
Aerial photograph of HMAS Waterhen. Three Huon-class minehunters are among the vessels berthed at the base's wharves

Six Huon-class ships were built; all were named after famous Australian rivers (the names of which had been carried by previous RAN vessels). The hull of the lead ship, HMAS Huon, was laid down during September 1994 at the Intermarine SpA Sarzana shipyard in Italy, and was transferred out to ADI's Newcastle facility as deck cargo, arriving on 31 August 1995. Huon was completed in Newcastle in 1999, and the other five ships were constructed completely at the Australian shipyard, with 69% Australian content in the project. All six were completed on schedule, with the last, HMAS Yarra, commissioning on 1 March 2003.

== Operational history ==
All six vessels are based at HMAS Waterhen, which serves as the home base of the Mine Warfare and Clearance Diving Group. As part of the force structure changes arising from the 2003 Defence Capability Review two Huon-class ships were deactivated and placed in reserve. HMAS Huon was deactivated in early 2006, but was reactivated later in the year, while HMAS Hawkesbury's planned deactivation was cancelled so the ships could be used as patrol boats.

Apart from routine service in Australian and regional waters, a number of vessels were deployed to the Solomon Islands as part of the Australian-led RAMSI peacekeeping mission there. Operating as part of Operation Anode from 2003, vessels deployed have included Hawkesbury, Diamantina, Yarra and Gascoyne. As of 2008, Huon and Hawkesbury were taking turns supporting border security operations. However, by October 2011 Hawkesbury and Norman were placed into reserve; the Department of Defence predicted that it would take five years to bring both back to operational status and train enough personnel to run all six vessels. Both minehunters were decommissioned on 31 October 2018.

== Eventual replacement ==
Defending Australia in the Asia Pacific Century: Force 2030, the 2009 Department of Defence white paper, proposed replacing the Huons, along with the RAN's patrol and hydrographic vessels, with a single class of multi-role offshore combatant vessels (OCVs). The new vessels, which could displace up to 2,000 tonnes and be equipped for helicopter or unmanned aerial vehicle operations, will use a modular mission payload system to change between roles as required. Although the 2013 White Paper committed to the OCV as a long-term plan, it announced that life-extending upgrades to the Huons would be sought as a short-term solution. In 2020, the Royal Australian Navy announced that the Huon class may be replaced with a modified version of the Arafura-class offshore patrol vessel.

== Ships ==
Ship name	Hull number	Commissioned	Status
Huon	M 82	15 May 1999	Decommissioned 30 May 2024
Hawkesbury	M 83	12 February 2000	Decommissioned 31 October 2018. Offered for sale as of 2018 and sold to be converted to a superyacht
Norman	M 84	26 August 2000	Decommissioned 31 October 2018. Offered for sale as of 2018 and sold to be converted to a superyacht
Gascoyne	M 85	2 June 2001	Decommissioned 5 December 2024
Diamantina	M 86	4 May 2002	Active
Yarra	M 87	1 March 2003	Active
