= Lerici-class minehunter =

Class of Italian minehunters

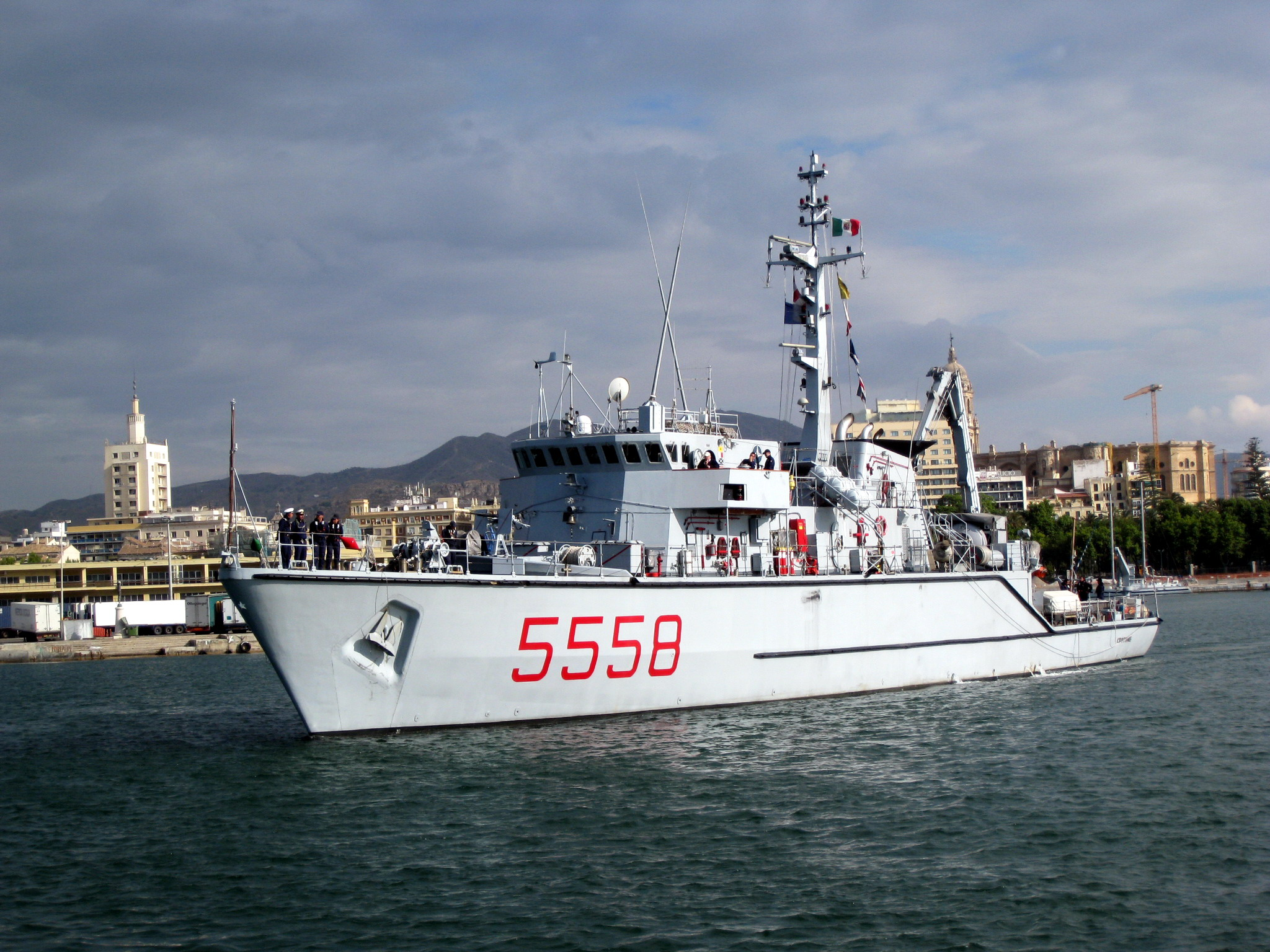
- Crotone – ninth ship of the Lerici class

Class overview
- Name: Lerici class
- Builders: Intermarine SpA
- Operators: Italian Navy; Algerian National Navy; Royal Australian Navy; Finnish Navy; Royal Malaysian Navy; Nigerian Navy; Republic of China Navy; Royal Thai Navy; United States Navy
- Subclasses: Subclasses: Lerici class; Second Series Lerici class or Gaeta class; Export derivatives: Mahamiru class (Malaysia and Nigeria); Osprey class (United States); Huon class (Australia); Lat Ya class (Thailand); Katanpää class (Finland)
- Built: 1985–1997 (Italian-operated vessels)
- Planned: 5 (Taiwan)
- Building: 2 (Algeria); 1 (Taiwan)
- Completed: 12 (Italy); 1 (Algeria); 3 (Finland); 4 (Malaysia); 2 (Nigeria); 12 (USA); 6 (Australia); 2 (Thailand)
- Canceled: 6 (Thailand)

General characteristics for Lerici class
- Type: Minehunter
- Displacement: - 635 t (625 long tons) full load; - 503 t (495 long tons) light
- Length: 49.98 m (164 ft 0 in)
- Beam: 9.56 m (31 ft 4 in)
- Draught: 2.9 m (9 ft 6 in)
- Propulsion: - (Italian Lerici): 1 × diesel engine Grandi Motori Trieste GMT BL-230.8M, 1,089 kW (1,460 bhp), driving a single variable pitch propeller; - (Italian Lerici): 3 × active rudders by 3 diesel engines Isotta Fraschini ID-36-SS 6V
- Speed: - 14 knots (26 km/h; 16 mph) maximum speed; - 6 knots (11 km/h; 6.9 mph) minehunting speed
- Range: 1,500 nautical miles (2,800 km; 1,700 mi) at 6 knots (11 km/h; 6.9 mph)
- Boats & landing craft carried: 2 remote-operated mine-clearance vehicles
- Complement: 47: 4 officers, 7 clearance divers, 36 ratings
- Sensors & processing systems: VDS FIAR SQQ-14 (IT) sonar
- Armament: 1 × Bofors 40 mm gun or 1 × Oerlikon 20 mm cannon

General characteristics for Gaeta class
- Displacement: 697 tons full load
- Length: 52.5 m (172 ft 3 in)
- Armament: 2 × Oerlikon 20 mm cannon
- Notes: All other characteristics as above are taken from:

The Lerici class is a class of minehunters constructed by Intermarine SpA and owned and operated by the Italian and Algerian navies. The class incorporates two subclasses: the first four ships are referred to specifically as the first series of the Lerici class, while eight more ships produced to a slightly modified design are known as "second series Lericis" or as the Gaeta class.

The class design has also been used as the basis for ships of the Royal Malaysian Navy (as the Mahamiru class), the Nigerian Navy, the United States Navy (as the Osprey class), the Royal Australian Navy (as the Huon class), and the Royal Thai Navy (as the Lat Ya class). Three updated vessels were constructed for the Finnish Navy (the Katanpää class). The Republic of Korea Navy operates an unlicensed derivative, known as the Ganggyeong class.

== Design and service history ==
Twelve ships were constructed by Intermarine SpA between 1985 and 1996. The first four, referred to as the Lerici subclass) were ordered on 7 January 1978. Six more ships of an improved design (known as the Gaeta subclass) were ordered on 30 April 1988, with two more Gaetas ordered in 1991.

=== Lerici class ===
The four Lerici-class ships were launched from September 1982 through to April 1985, and were all commissioned into the Italian Navy during 1985.

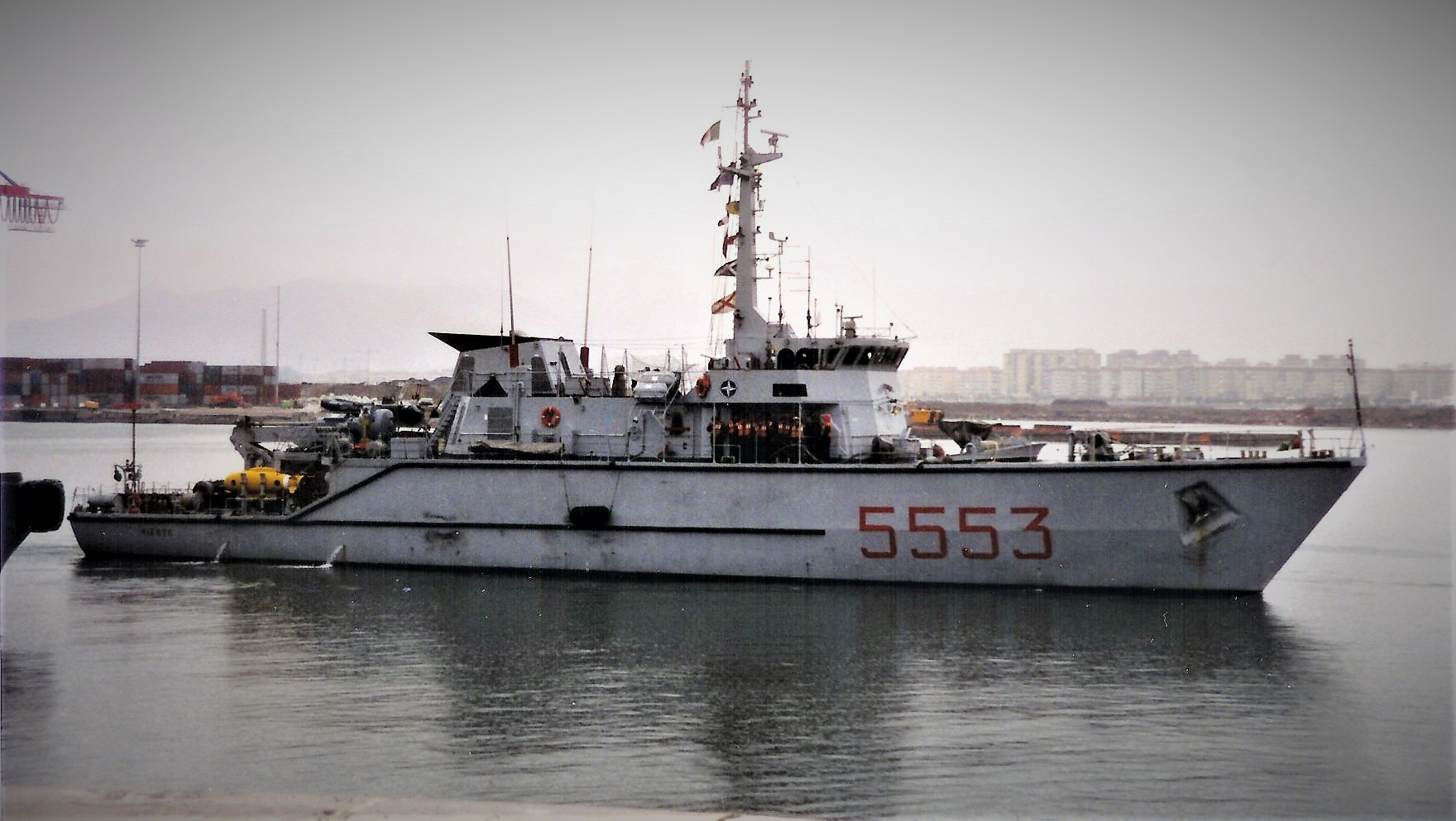
Vieste

Lerici-class ships have a displacement of 620 tons full load, 50 metres (164 ft 1 in) long, 9.9 metres (32 ft 6 in) wide, and a draught of 2.6 metres (8 ft 6 in). The ships have a maximum speed of 14 knots (26 km/h; 16 mph), provided by a single diesel engine (GMT BL.230-8M for 1,600 hp; 1,200 kW) connected to an electric engine (1,985 hp; 1,480 kW) with a variable-pitch propeller. This speed is reduced to 6 knots (11 km/h; 6.9 mph) for mine-warfare operations; three active rudders (small propellers mounted in a unit which can rotate through 360 degrees, powered by three diesel-engines generators Isotta Fraschini ID-36-SS6V) are used to keep the minehunters on station. The ships have a range of 1,500 nautical miles (2,800 km; 1,700 mi) at operational speed.

Each ship has a standard complement of 47, made up of 4 officers, 7 clearance divers, and 36 ratings. They are equipped with one hyperbaric chamber, one mechanical minesweeper system Oropesa Mk4, two ROV Whitehead-Riva Calzoni MIN-77 (then replaced by one ROV Gaymarine Pluto GIGAS) and Gaymarine Pluto, remote-operated submersibles for mine investigation and clearance, and VDS FIAR SQQ-14 (IT) sonar. CMS (Combat Management System) is Datamat MM/SSN-714(V)3. Two navigation radars: one GEM Elettronica SPN-754 (I band) and one GEM Elettronica SPN-753(V)1 ARPA (I band), completed by integrated navigation system Motorola MRS III. The ships are armed with a single Oerlikon 20 mm cannon (then replaced by Browning M2 12.7 mm).

=== Gaeta class ===
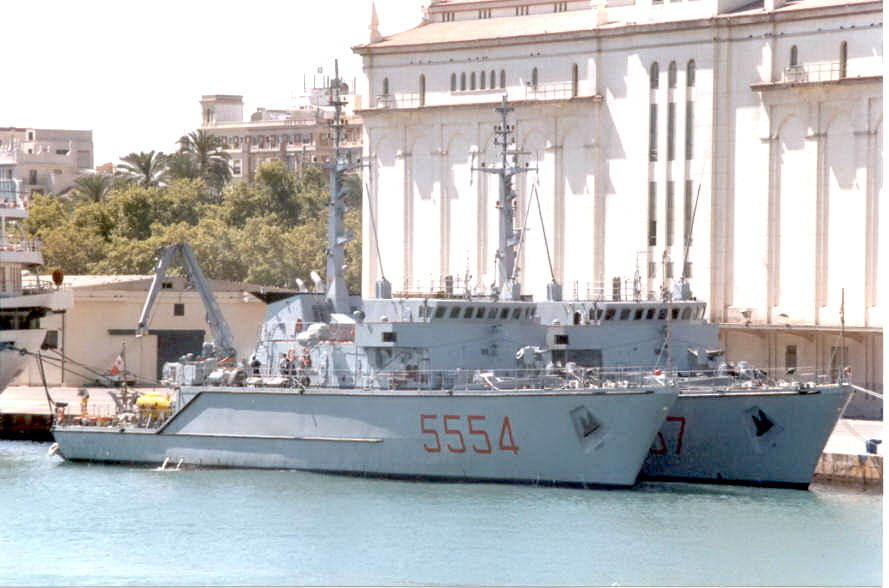
Gaeta (foreground) and Numana

Depending on the source, the Gaeta-class ships are considered to be either a Lerici subclass, or a separate class of ships.
The eight ships of the Second Series Lerici class, more commonly known as the Gaeta class, were all launched in the early 1990s, and were commissioned by May 1996. The Gaeta class is almost identical to the Lerici class: the main structural differences between the ships are that displacement of the latter is 77 tons greater, the hull is 2.5 metres (8.2 ft) longer, and the communications mast was moved from above the bridge to just forward of the exhaust funnel. The Gaetas also used an improved version of the VDS FIAR SQQ-14 (IT) sonar, which was fitted in 1991 to the four Lerici-class ships.
ROV are Gaymarine Pluto and Gaymarine Pluto GIGAS.
Navigation radar GEM Elettronica SPN-753 replaced with (V)9 ARPA version (I band).CMS was evolved version (Combat Management System) Datamat SSN-714(V)3UL. On board one larger hyperbaric chamber (8 seats).

==== Gaeta MLU ====
In 2010 Intermarine began MLU (mid-life update), expected to complete in 2018. New sonar is Thales 2093 Mk2, new CMS (Combat Management System) Selex ES SSN-714(V)4, new containerized and removable hyperbaric chamber and added new EMDV (Expendable Mine Disposal Vehicle) Gaymarine Plutino (MIKI, MIne KIller).

== Derivatives ==
The Lerici class design has been successfully exported to Algeria, Australia, Finland, Malaysia, Nigeria, the United States, Thailand and Taiwan. However, an inflexible export policy and demands by Intermarine that all ships be built in Italy are believed to have prevented wider sales. These restrictions were lessened in the leadup to the deals with the United States and Australia.

=== Mahamiru class ===
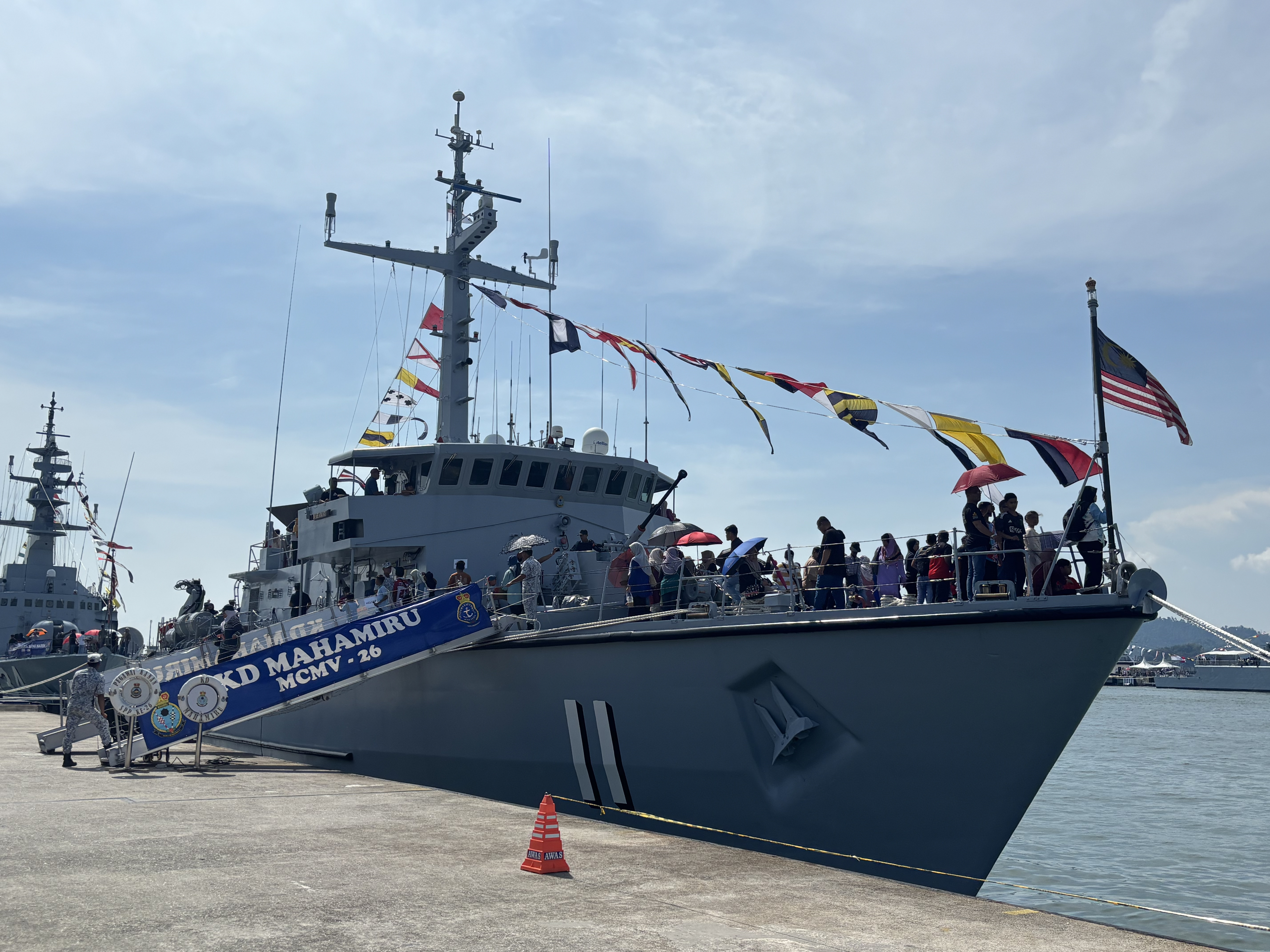
KD Mahamiru dressed overall at Lumut Naval Base during the base open day in May 2026

The Royal Malaysian Navy operates four ships based on the Lerici class design: KDs Mahamiru (11), Jerai (12), Ledang (13), and Kinabalu (14). The four ships were ordered from Intermarine on 20 February 1981, commissioned into the Royal Malaysian Navy on 11 December 1985, and arrived in Malaysia on 26 March 1986. Referred to as "Malaysian Lericis" or as Mahamiru-class ships, two each are based in Lumut and Labuan.

Mahamiru-class ships vary in design from the Lerici class. Most significant of these is that Mahamirus are equipped with two diesel engines with dedicated propeller shafts instead of a single engine and propeller, giving them a maximum speed of 16 knots (30 km/h; 18 mph) and a minehunting speed of 7 knots (13 km/h; 8.1 mph). The Malaysian ships are also equipped with Thomson Sintra TSM 2022 sonar, Thomson-CSF radar, and two PAP-104 remote-operated submersibles, and are 1 metre (3.3 ft) longer than the Italian vessels they were based on. Instead of the 20 mm Oerlikon, the ships are armed with a single Bofors 40 mm L/70 gun. The standard crew complement is 42, 5 of whom are officers.

In 2008, Mahamiru and Ledang were modernised by Thales as part of the Royal Malaysian Navy's Service Life Extension Program. The TSM 2022 sonars were upgraded to the Mark III version, and the ships were reconditioned to meet a minimum of ten more years active service.

=== Nigerian Lerici ===
In the late 1980s, the Nigerian Navy acquired two Lerici-class ships. Ohue (M 371) was ordered in April 1983, laid down on 23 July 1984, launched on 22 November 1985, and commissioned on 28 May 1987. Marabai (M 372) was laid down on 11 March 1985, launched on 6 June 1986, and commissioned on 25 February 1988.

The Nigerian Lericis are based on the Mahamiru class, but use the Pluto submersible, a Racal Decca 1226 radar, and are slightly slower with a maximum speed of 15.5 knots (28.7 km/h; 17.8 mph). The Nigerian ships are armed with two 30 mm cannons, and have a crew complement of 50, including 5 officers.

Because of a lack of funding and maintenance, Ohue and Marabai were among several ships of the Nigerian Navy that were non-operational by 1996. However, as at 2013, both of these vessels are currently undergoing refurbishment prior to rejoining the Nigerian Naval fleet.

=== Osprey class ===
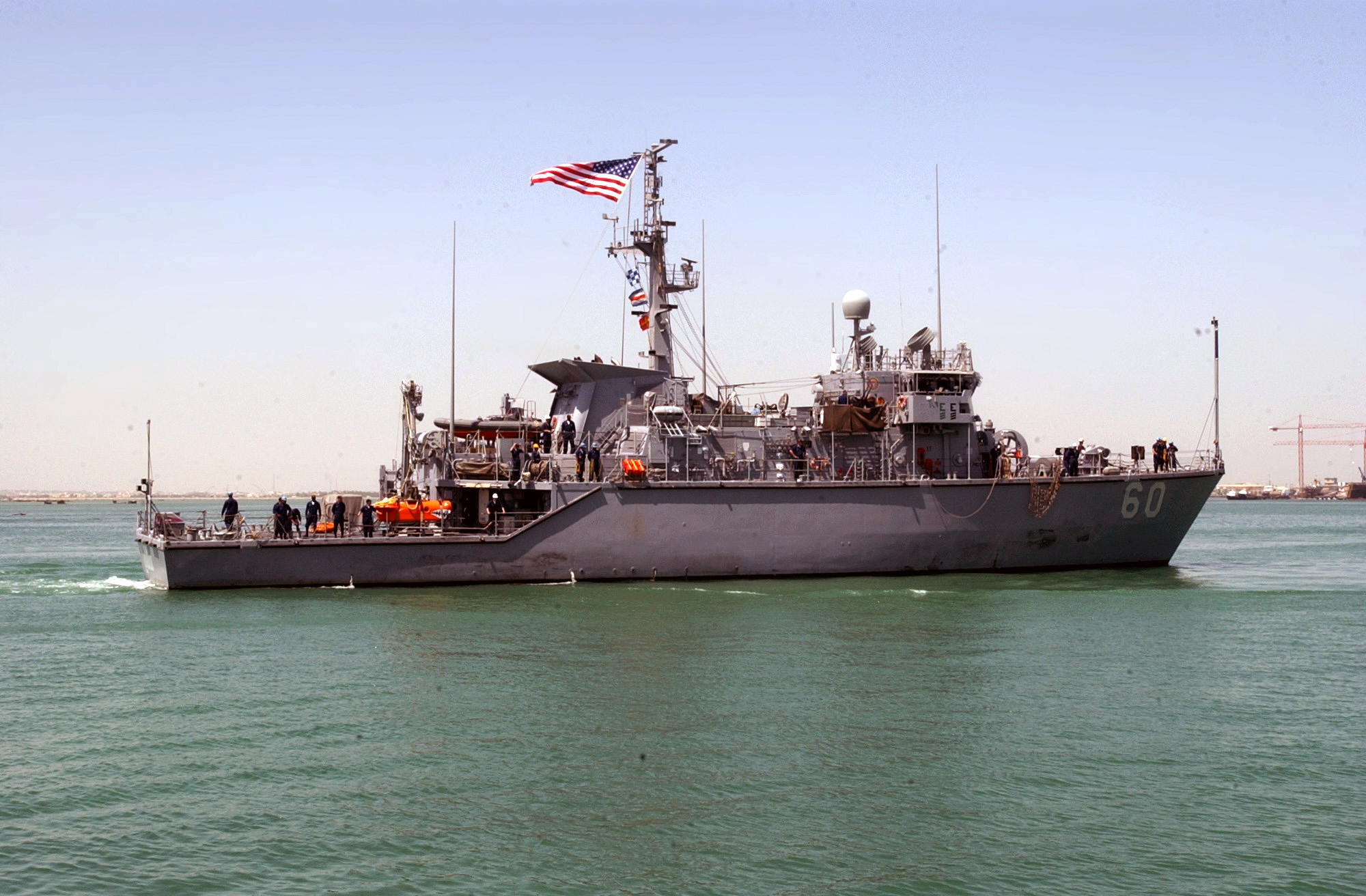
USS Cardinal

In August 1986, following the cancellation of a 17-strong mine warfare ship class after the prototype failed shock testing, the United States Navy placed an order for a mine warfare ship based on the Lerici class. In order to keep construction of the twelve ships, referred to as the Osprey class, under the control of Intermarine, the company established Intermarine USA by acquiring the Sayler Marine Corporation. Initially, the twelve ships were to be built by Intermarine USA in Savannah, Georgia, but in October 1989, construction for four ships was contracted out to Avondale Industries. The ships were launched between March 1991 and June 1997, and were commissioned between November 1993 and December 1998.

The Osprey-class ships are larger than the other Lerici designs: they displace 918 tons fully loaded, are 57.3 metres (188 ft 0 in) long, 11 metres (36 ft 1 in) wide, and with a draught of 2.9 metres (9 ft 6 in). The ships are fitted with two diesel motors driving two Voith Schneider Propellers; these cycloidal propellers eliminate the need for the aft two active rudders. The ships use a Raytheon/Thomson Sintra SQQ-32 VDS sonar for minehunting, and Alliant SLQ-48 remote vehicles for mine disposal. The ships normally carry a crew of 51, including four officers, and are armed with two 12.7-millimetre (0.50 in) machine guns.

Upon entering service, the twelve ships were assigned to the United States Atlantic Fleet, with the intention that they remain in service for approximately twelve months before being transferred to the United States Navy Reserve. However, all of the ships remained in service until decommissioning in 2006 and 2007. The class was replaced in service by the Avenger-class mine countermeasures ships, and as of 2008, eight Ospreys had either been transferred to or marked for transfer to other navies: two each to the Hellenic Navy, Lithuanian Navy, Turkish Navy, and Republic of China (Taiwan) Navy.

=== Huon class ===
In 1991, a force structure review saw the need to replace the Bay-class inshore minehunters. The operating capabilities of the Bay class were found to be severely lacking, with four of the six ships cancelled before construction started. In 1994, a contract was awarded to Australian Defence Industries (ADI) to construct six minehunters based on the Gaeta subclass. The construction was to be a joint venture with Intermarine.

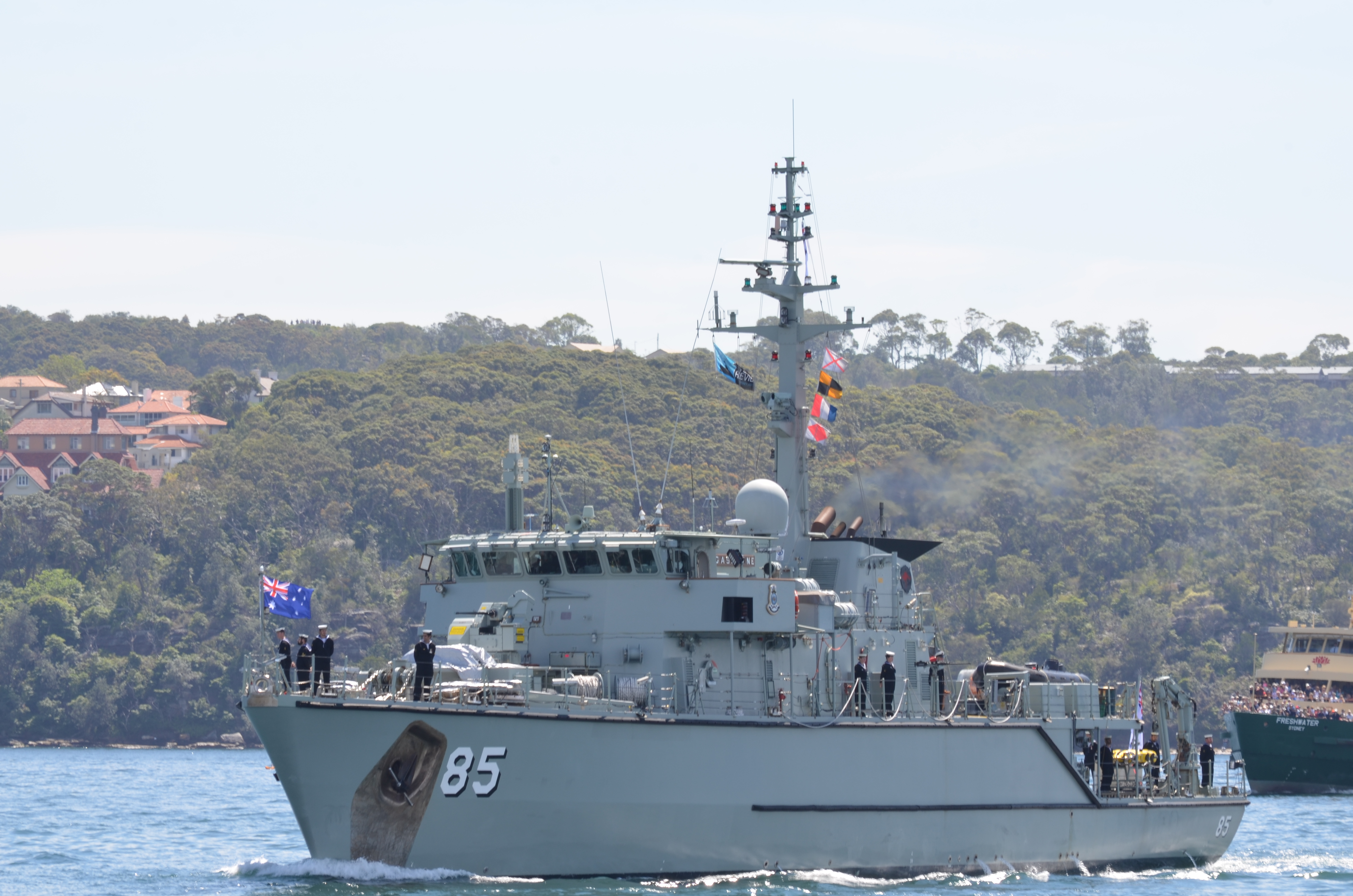
HMAS Gascoyne in Sydney Harbour in 2013

The hull of the first ship, HMAS Huon was constructed by the Intermarine shipyard in Sarzana, Italy, then was sent to Australia in 1995 for fitting out at ADI's shipyard in Newcastle, New South Wales. ADI constructed the other five ships in the class, which were all named after Australian rivers.

The Australian ships, which are referred to as the Huon class, have a slightly greater displacement and draft than the Gaetas. The ships use a GEC-Marconi Type 2093 sonar, two SUTEC Double Eagle remote mine disposal vehicles, and are armed with a 30 mm DC30B gun. The ships have a crew of 36 (including 6 officers), with further accommodation for 13 more, including 6 divers. The class entered service between 1998 and 2002 and is based at HMAS Waterhen in Sydney.

=== Lat Ya class ===
Eight minehunters based on the Gaeta class were ordered by the Royal Thai Navy on 19 September 1996, after Intermarine won the tendering process initiated in April that year. Built at Intermarine's Sarzana shipyard, the first two ships of this class (HTM Ships Lat Ya and Tha Din Daeng were laid down in 1998 and launched in 1999. The other six ships were cancelled before they were laid down.

In comparison to the Gaetas, Lat Ya-class ships have a slightly greater displacement of 680 tons, with a corresponding increase in draught to 2.9 metres (9.5 ft). They use Atlas Elektronik radar and sonar, Pluto ROVs, and are fitted with a 30-millimetre (1.2 in) MSI cannon. Each ship carries 8 officers, and 42 other crew.

=== Katanpää class ===
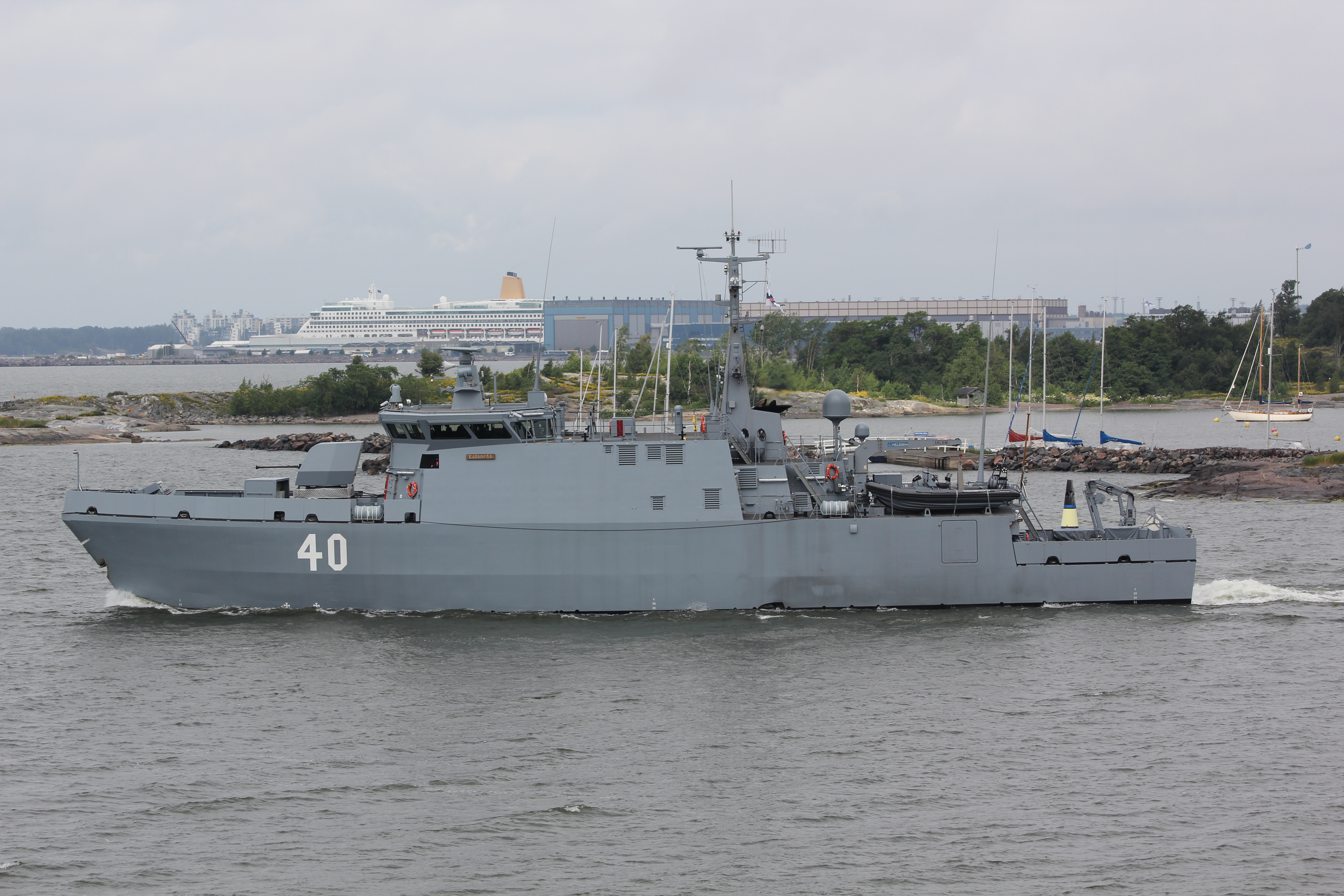
Lead ship Katanpää underway in the Särkänsalmi strait in 2012

In 2004, the Finnish Navy began to look at replacements for the Kuha-class minesweepers, which had been in service since 1974. On 23 November 2006, a contract was signed with Intermarine to build three mine countermeasures vessels (initially referred to as the MCMV 2010 class, then as the MITO class).

The MITOs are based on the Huon class design, but with a redesigned superstructure.

== Unlicensed designs ==
=== Ganggyeong class ===
The six Ganggyeong- (Swallow-) class ships of the Republic of Korea Navy are an unlicensed derivative of the Lerici class. Constructed by the Kangnam Shipbuilding Corporation, the class was commissioned into service between 1986 and 1994. The ships are smaller and less capable than the other Lerici designs.

== List ==
Intermarine Lerici Minehunter

Pennant number	Name	Shipyard	Laid down	Launched	Commissioned	Decommissioned	Note
Italian Navy – Lerici class ( 4 vessels )
M 5550	Lerici	Intermarine Spa; Sarzana (La Spezia)	27 June 1978	3 September 1982	4 May 1985	24.09.2015	
M 5551	Sapri	Intermarine Spa; Sarzana (La Spezia)	27 June 1978	5 April 1982	14 December 1985	24.09.2015	
M 5552	Milazzo	Intermarine Spa; Sarzana (La Spezia)	27 June 1978	1 April 1982	14 December 1985	15.10.2025	
M 5553	Vieste	Intermarine Spa; Sarzana (La Spezia)	18 April 1978	5 April 1984	14 December 1985		
Italian Navy – Gaeta class ( 8 vessels )
M 5554	Gaeta	Intermarine Spa; Sarzana (La Spezia)	5 August 1988	9 October 1990	3 July 1992		
M 5555	Termoli	Intermarine Spa; Sarzana (La Spezia)	5 August 1988	18 December 1990	13 November 1992		
M 5556	Alghero	Intermarine Spa; Sarzana (La Spezia)	5 August 1988	22 May 1991	31 March 1993		
M 5557	Numana	Intermarine Spa; Sarzana (La Spezia)	5 August 1988	20 March 1992	30 July 1993		
M 5558	Crotone	Intermarine Spa; Sarzana (La Spezia)	5 August 1988	8 September 1992	2 February 1994		
M 5559	Viareggio	Intermarine Spa; Sarzana (La Spezia)	5 August 1988	11 May 1993	1 July 1994		
M 5560	Chioggia	Intermarine Spa; Sarzana (La Spezia)	11 June 1994	23 June 1994	18 May 1996		
M 5561	Rimini	Intermarine Spa; Sarzana (La Spezia)	6 November 1992	17 January 1995	10 November 1996		
Algerian National Navy – ( 3 vessels )
501	El-Kasseh 1	Intermarine Spa; Sarzana (La Spezia)	2012	5 April 2016	20 June 2017		
502	El-Kasseh 2	Intermarine Spa; Sarzana (La Spezia)	2016	20 December 2018	29 July 2020		
503	El-Kasseh 3	Intermarine Spa; Sarzana (La Spezia)			4 May 2022		
Royal Australian Navy – Huon class ( 6 vessels )
M 82	Huon	Intermarine Spa; Sarzana (La Spezia)	9.1994		15 May 1999	Decommissioned 30 May 2024	
M 83	Hawkesbury	ADI (Australian Defence Industries); Newcastle, New South Wales			12 February 2000	Decommissioned 31 October 2018. Offered for sale as of 2018. Sold and new owners have taken possession.	
M 84	Norman	ADI (Australian Defence Industries); Newcastle, New South Wales			26 August 2000	Decommissioned 31 October 2018. Offered for sale as of 2018. Sold and new owners have taken possession.	
M 85	Gascoyne	ADI (Australian Defence Industries); Newcastle, New South Wales			2 June 2001	Decommissioned early 2025.	Moved to Newcastle harbour, awaiting sale.
M 86	Diamantina	ADI (Australian Defence Industries); Newcastle, New South Wales			4 May 2002		
M 87	Yarra	ADI (Australian Defence Industries); Newcastle, New South Wales			1 March 2003		
Finnish Navy – Katanpää class ( 3 vessels )
40	Katanpää	Intermarine Spa; Sarzana (La Spezia)	7.2007		4 May 2012		
41	Purunpää	Intermarine Spa; Sarzana (La Spezia)	3.2008		20 August 2013		
42	Vahterpää	Intermarine Spa; Sarzana (La Spezia)	2.2009		4 November 2014		
Royal Malaysian Navy – Mahamiru class ( 4 vessels )
11	Mahamiru	Intermarine Spa; Sarzana (La Spezia)			11 December 1985		
12	Jerai	Intermarine Spa; Sarzana (La Spezia)			11 December 1985		
13	Ledang	Intermarine Spa; Sarzana (La Spezia)			11 December 1985		
14	Kinabalu	Intermarine Spa; Sarzana (La Spezia)			11 December 1985		
Nigerian Navy – Ohue class ( 2 vessels )
M 371	Ohue	Intermarine Spa; Sarzana (La Spezia)	23 July 1984	22 November 1985	28 May 1987		
M 372	Marabai	Intermarine Spa; Sarzana (La Spezia)	11 March 1985	6 June 1986	25 February 1988		
United States Navy – Osprey class ( 12 vessels )
MHC-51	Osprey	Intermarine USA			1993	2006	Sold for scrap in 2014
MHC-52	Heron	Intermarine USA			1994	2007	Sold to Greek Navy as HS Kalypso (M 64)
MHC-53	Pelican	Avondale Shipyard; Westwego (United States)			1995	2007	Sold to Greek Navy as HS Evniki (M 61)
MHC-54	Robin	Avondale Shipyard; Westwego (United States)			1996	2006	Sold for scrap in 2014
MHC-55	Oriole	Intermarine USA			1995	2006	Sold to Republic of China Navy (Taiwan)
MHC-56	Kingfisher	Avondale Shipyard; Gulfport (United States)			1996	2007	Sold for scrap in 2014
MHC-57	Cormorant	Avondale Shipyard; Gulfport (United States)			1997	2007	Sold for scrap in 2014
MHC-58	Black Hawk	Intermarine USA			1996	2007	Sold for scrap in 2014
MHC-59	Falcon	Intermarine USA			1997	2006	Sold to Republic of China Navy (Taiwan)
MHC-60	Cardinal	Intermarine USA			1997	2007	Sold to the Egyptian Navy, renamed as al Sedeeq (MHC-521)
MHC-61	Raven	Intermarine USA			1998	2007	Sold to the Egyptian Navy, renamed as al Farouk (MHC-524)
MHC-62	Shrike	Intermarine USA			1999	2007	Sold for scrap in 2014
Republic of China Navy (Taiwan) – ( 6 vessels )
	First hull	Intermarine Spa; Sarzana (La Spezia)			2019		Project 242
	2nd–3rd-4th–5th-6th hull	Ching Fu Shipbuilding Co Ltd (Taiwan)			2023		
Royal Thai Navy – Lat Ya class ( 2 vessels )
MHC 633	Lat Ya	Intermarine Spa; Sarzana (La Spezia)	1998		1999		
MHC 634	Tha Din Daeng	Intermarine Spa; Sarzana (La Spezia)	1988		1999		

== See also ==
Equivalent minehunters of the same era

- Avenger class
- Sandown class
- Frankenthal class
- Alkmaar class
- Landsort class
- Type 082
