= List of ships named Norman =

A number of ships have been named Norman, including:

== Warships ==
- HMT Norman III (1894), a trawler, renamed from Norman, requisitioned 1916–1919
- HMT The Norman (1908), a trawler, requisitioned 1916–1919
- HMT Norman II (1911), a trawler, renamed from Norman, requisitioned 1915–1919
- HMS Norman (1916), an M-class destroyer built by Palmers at Hebburn, and broken up in 1921
- Norman (1940), an N-class destroyer for the Royal Australian Navy and transferred to the Royal Navy in 1945 and scrapped in 1958
- Norman (1999), a Huon-class minehunter built for the Royal Australian Navy; in reserve since 2011

== Merchant ships ==
- SS Norman (1854), a screw steamship of Union Line's passenger services to Brazil and southern Africa; sold 1864 and stranded in 1881
- SS Norman (1890), an American bulk freighter which sank in Lake Huron in 1895
- SS Norman (1894), a twin screw steamship of Union Line's passenger mail services to southern Africa; in the merged Union-Castle Line from 1900 until broken up in 1926
- Norman (1943), the former Royal Navy Military-class trawler Bombardier, wrecked in southern Greenland on 4 October 1952 with only one survivor from a crew of 21.

== Others ==
- Norman boat, a cabin cruiser built by Norman Cruisers Limited
