= Diamantina =

Diamantina may refer to:

== Geography ==
=== Australia ===
- Diamantina Bowen (1833–1893), grande dame of Queensland and the wife of Sir George Bowen, the first Governor of Queensland.
- Diamantina Cocktail, 1976 album by Little River Band
- Diamantina National Park, Queensland
- Diamantina River, a river in Queensland and South Australia
- HMAS Diamantina, two ships in the Royal Australian Navy
- Shire of Diamantina, a local government area in Queensland

=== Brazil ===
- Chapada Diamantina, a region of Bahia state
- Diamantina, Minas Gerais, a municipality and UNESCO World Heritage Site

=== Elsewhere ===
- Diamantina fracture zone, Indian Ocean trench
  - Diamantina Deep

== Biology ==
- Diamantina (plant), a genus of plants in the family Podostemaceae

== In fiction ==
- Diamantina, a fictional island in the Indian Ocean, in the animated television series Noah's Island
