= HMAS Yarra (DE 45) =

1958 River-class destroyer escort

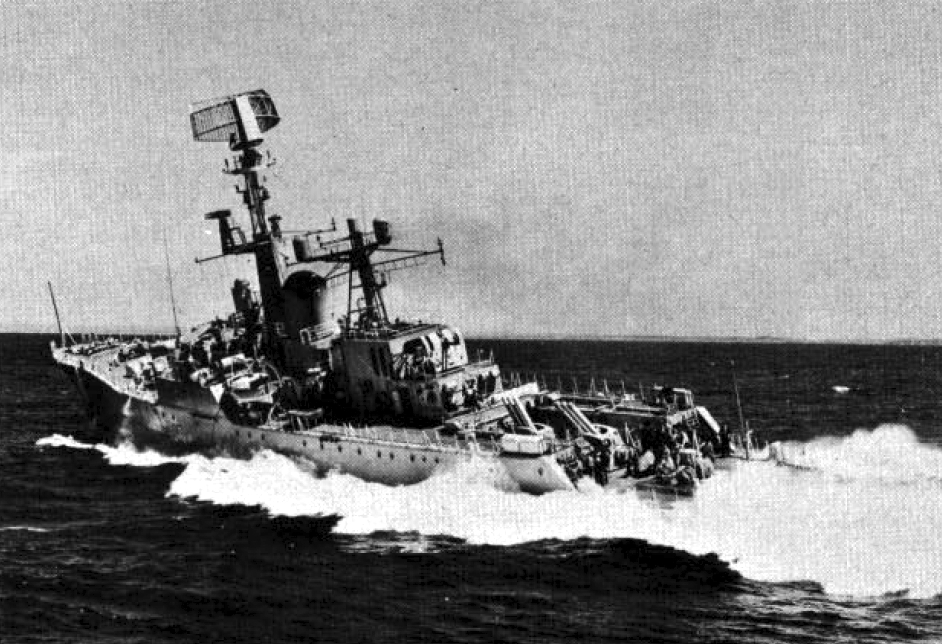
- HMAS Yarra (DE 45) underway circa 1962

History

Australia
- Namesake: The Yarra River
- Builder: Williamstown Naval Dockyard
- Laid down: 9 April 1957
- Launched: 30 September 1958
- Commissioned: 27 July 1961
- Decommissioned: 22 November 1985
- Motto: "Hunt and Strike"
- Honours and awards: Battle honours: Malaysia 1964–1966; Plus four inherited honours
- Fate: Broken up for scrap
- Badge

General characteristics
- Class & type: River-class destroyer escort
- Displacement: 2,750 tons full load
- Length: 112.8 m (370 ft)
- Beam: 12.49 m (41.0 ft)
- Draught: 5.18 m (17.0 ft)
- Propulsion: 2 × English Electric steam turbines; 2 shafts; 30,000 shp total
- Speed: 30 knots (56 km/h; 35 mph)
- Complement: 250
- Sensors & processing systems: LW-02 long range air warning radar; 1979: Mulloka sonar system; SPS-55 surface-search/navigation radar; Mark 22 fire control radar
- Armament: Original: 2 × 4.5-inch (110 mm) Mk 6 guns; 2 × Limbo Mk 10 anti-submarine mortars (both later removed); 2 × 40-millimetre (1.6 in) Bofors (later removed); '1965 refit: 1 × quad Seacat SAM launcher; 1979 refit: 1 × Ikara ASW system
- Notes: Taken from:

HMAS Yarra (F07/DE 45), named for the Yarra River, was a River-class destroyer escort of the Royal Australian Navy (RAN). The antisubmarine warship operated from 1961 to 1985.

== Construction ==
Yarra was laid down by the Williamstown Naval Dockyard at Melbourne, Victoria on 9 April 1957. An enhanced derivative of the Royal Navy's Type 12 frigate, Yarra was one of four ships constructed to provide an anti-submarine warfare capability for the RAN. She was launched on 30 September 1958 by Lady McBride, wife of the Minister for Defence and commissioned into the RAN on 27 July 1961.

== Operational history ==
Yarra operated during the Indonesia-Malaysia Confrontation; during a three-week patrol in June 1965, the ship fired on an Indonesian incursion force near Sabah. The ship's service was later recognised with the battle honour "Malaysia 1964–66".

In 1983, Yarra was accompanied by the patrol boats Warrnambool and Ipswich on a deployment to South-East Asia for the multinational Exercise Starfish.

== Decommissioning and fate ==
Yarra paid off 22 November 1985. She was sold for scrap.
