= HMAS Gascoyne =

Two ships of the Royal Australian Navy have been named HMAS Gascoyne, after the Gascoyne River, the longest river in Western Australia.

- HMAS Gascoyne (K354), a River-class frigate laid down in 1942 and paid off in 1966
- HMAS Gascoyne (M 85), a Huon-class minehunter in service as of 2016

== Battle honours ==
Ships named HMAS Gascoyne are entitled to carry five battle honours:

- New Guinea 1944
- Leyte Gulf 1944
- Lingayen Gulf 1945
- Borneo 1945
- Pacific 1945
