= HMAS Yarra =

Four ships of the Royal Australian Navy (RAN) have been named HMAS Yarra after the Yarra River in Victoria.

- HMAS Yarra (D79), a River-class torpedo boat destroyer commissioned into the Australian Commonwealth Naval Forces in 1910, transferred to the RAN on its foundation in 1911, operated until 1929, and scuttled
- HMAS Yarra (U77), a Grimsby-class sloop commissioned in 1936 and was lost on 4 March 1942 while defending a convoy from seven Japanese warships
- HMAS Yarra (DE 45), a River-class destroyer escort commissioned in 1961 and in service until 1985
- HMAS Yarra (M 87), a Huon-class minehunter commissioned in 2003 and in active service as of 2023

== Battle honours ==
Five battle honours have been awarded to ships named HMAS Yarra:

- Rabaul 1914
- Adriatic 1917–18
- Libya 1941
- East Indies 1942
- Malaysia 1964–66
