= HMAS Huon =

Two ships and one shore establishment of the Royal Australian Navy (RAN) have been named HMAS Huon, after the Huon River in Tasmania.

- HMAS Huon (D50), a River-class torpedo boat destroyer operating from 1915 until 1928, and sunk as a target in 1931
- HMAS Huon (naval base), the main naval facility in Tasmania from 1901 to 1994
- HMAS Huon (M 82), the lead ship of the Huon-class minehunters, which entered service in 1999, and decommissioned on 30 May 2024.

== Battle honours ==
Ships named HMAS Huon are entitled to carry a single battle honour:

- Adriatic 1917–18
