= HMAS Norman =

Two ships of the Royal Australian Navy (RAN) have been named HMAS Norman. The second ship is named for the Norman River in Queensland.

- HMAS Norman (G49), an N-class destroyer launched in 1940 and transferred to the Royal Navy in 1945
- HMAS Norman (M 84), a Huon-class minehunter launched in 1999 and commissioned but in reserve as of 2016

== Battle honours ==
Ships named HMAS Norman are entitled to bear a four battle honours:

- Indian Ocean 1942–44
- East Indies 1944
- Burma 1944–45
- Okinawa 1945
