= HMAS Diamantina =

Two ships of the Royal Australian Navy have been named HMAS Diamantina, after the Diamantina River in Queensland, named in honour of the wife of Governor of Queensland, Lady Diamantina Roma Bowen for her contribution to the State of Queensland.

- HMAS Diamantina (K377), a River-class frigate commissioned in 1945, decommissioned in 1980, and preserved as a museum ship
- HMAS Diamantina (M 86), a Huon-class minehunter, commissioned in 2001 and active as of 2016

== Battle honours ==
A single battle honour was earned by the frigate HMAS Diamantina, and is inherited by all subsequent ships of the name:

- Pacific 1945
