= Double Eagle (mine disposal vehicle) =

Remotely operated naval mine disposal vehicle

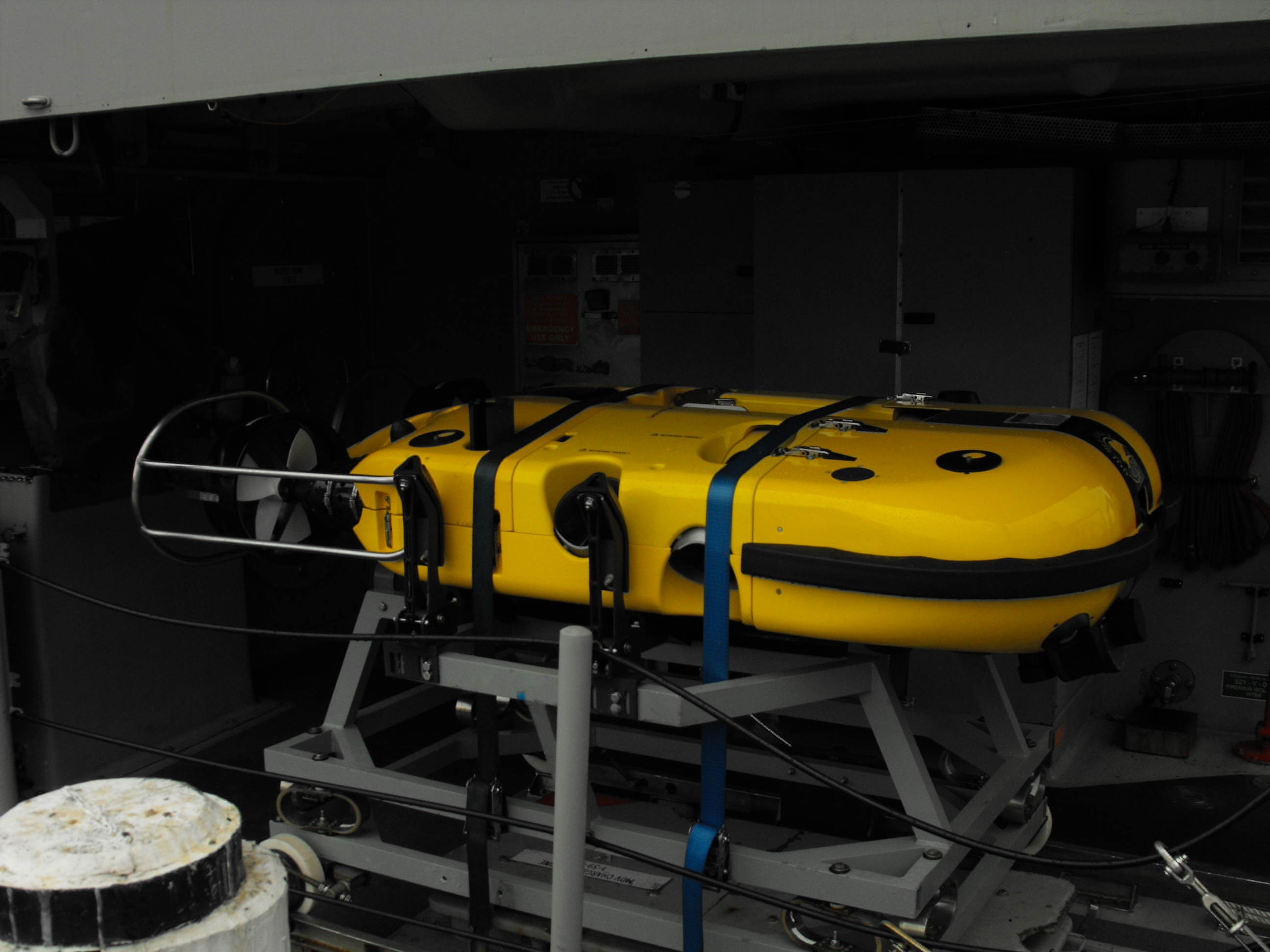
A Double Eagle Mark II ROV carried aboard the minehunter HMAS Yarra

The Double Eagle is a remotely operated vehicle (ROV) built by the Swedish defence company Saab Underwater Systems AB and used for the disposal of naval mines.

== Design ==
As of 2009, four versions of the ROV have been designed.

The original version was named the Sea Eagle, and was a militarised variant of the civilian Sea Owl ROV. This unit was 1.3 metres (4 ft 3 in) long, 0.76 metres (2 ft 6 in) wide, and 0.4 metres (1 ft 4 in) high, could travel at 3 knots (5.6 km/h; 3.5 mph), and dive to 500 metres (1,600 ft). These ROVs saw service with the Swedish Navy from 1984 onwards.

The second version, named the Double Eagle, is larger, measuring 1.9 metres (6 ft 3 in) in length, 1.3 metres (4 ft 3 in) in width, and 0.8 metres (2 ft 7 in) in height. The ROV weighs 400 kilograms (880 lb), can dive to 500 metres (1,600 ft), and travel at 5 knots (9.3 km/h; 5.8 mph).

=== Current models ===
The Double Eagle Mark II is larger but lighter than the first Double Eagle. Measuring 2.1 metres (6 ft 11 in) long, 1.3 metres (4 ft 3 in) wide, and 0.5 metres (1 ft 8 in) high, the unit weighs 340 kilograms (750 lb), dives to 500 metres (1,600 ft), and can reach 6 knots (11 km/h; 6.9 mph). The Mark II entered service in 1994.

The Mark III is 80 centimetres (31 in) longer and 130 kilograms (290 lb) heavier than its predecessor.

The ROV's payload can consist of scanning sonar, echo locations, doppler logs, or self-navigation systems. All Double Eagles are equipped with an extendable manipulator arm, which is commonly used to place a small explosive charge on a mine. The ROV can be modified to double as a self-propelled variable depth sonar: the Mark II Double Eagles fitted to the French Navy's Tripartite-class minehunters have been altered to carry a Thales TSM 2022 sonar, while a similar upgrade is to occur to the Mark III units being acquired for the Tripartites of the Royal Netherlands Navy.

The Double Eagle Mark II uses two 5 kilowatt brushless electric motors for main propulsion, and six 0.4 kilowatt brushless electric motors for fine manoeuvering. Mark III ROVs have four 7 kilowatt brushless electric motors as main thrusters. Double Eagles can operate in any orientation.

== Operators ==
=== Mark II ===
Royal Australian Navy

- Huon-class minehunter

Royal Danish Navy

- Flyvefisken-class patrol vessel (Standard Flex module)

Finnish Navy

- Katanpää-class mine countermeasure vessel

French Navy

- Tripartite-class minehunter

Swedish Navy

=== Mark III ===
Swedish Navy

- Koster-class minehunter
- Visby-class corvette
