= DS30B rapid fire cannon =

Naval weapon system

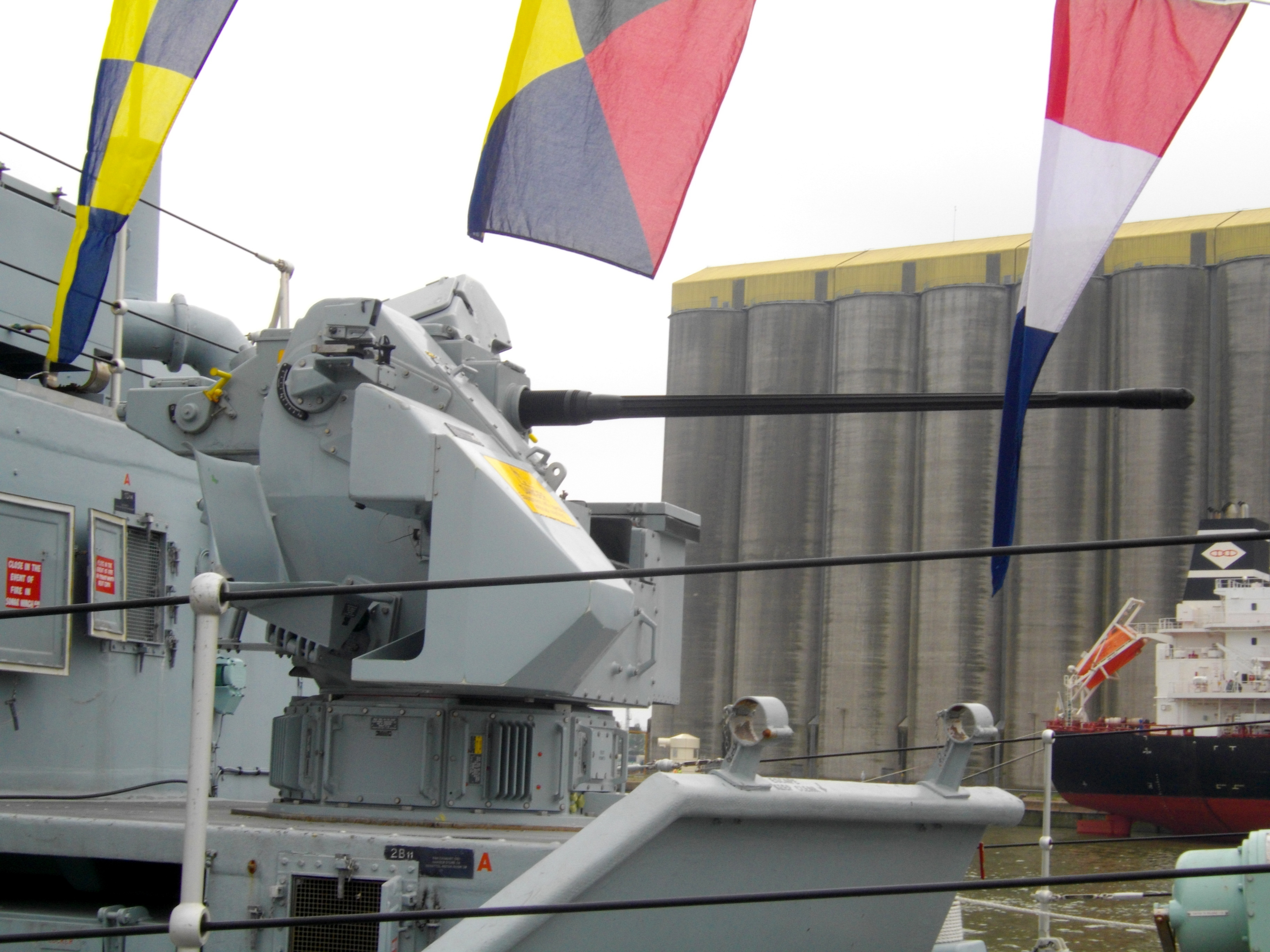
DS30B system on HMS Blyth

The DS30B rapid-fire cannon is a 30 mm Oerlikon stabilized, ship-protection system created by MSI-Defence Systems and controlled by a single operator.

== Description ==
The DS30B system consists of a marinized, stabilized gun mount which accommodates the Oerlikon KCB 30 mm cannon. The DS30B is the predecessor to the 30mm DS30M Mark 2 Automated Small Calibre Gun, which mounts a 30 mm Mark 44 Bushmaster II.

== Operators ==
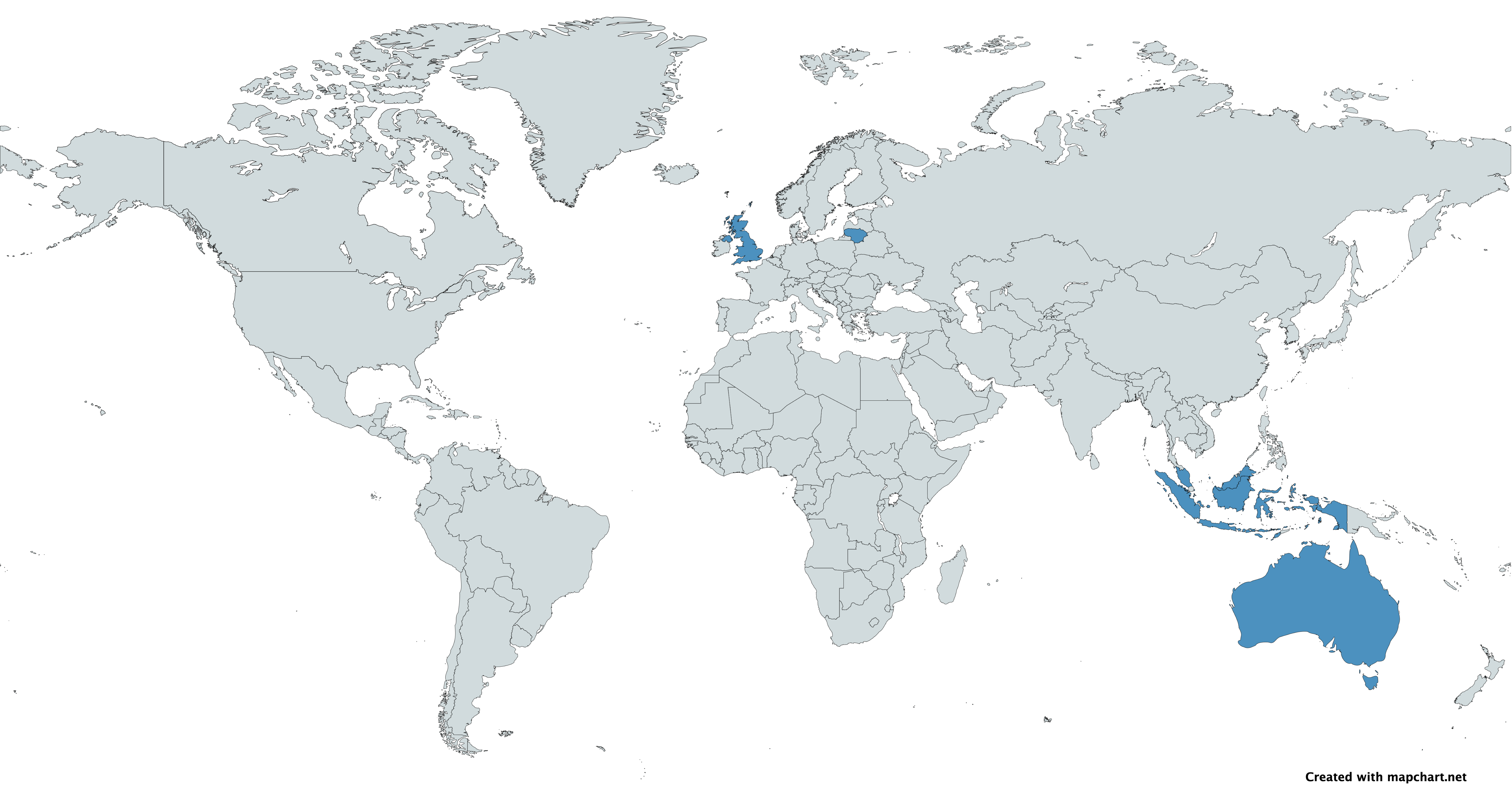
Map with users of the DS30B rapid fire cannon in blue

Australia

- Used by the Royal Australian Navy to equip Huon-class minehunters

Indonesia

- Used by the Indonesian Navy to equip Bung Tomo-class corvettes

Lithuania

- Used by the Lithuanian Naval Force to equip the minehunters Skalvis and Kuršis.

Malaysia

- Used by Royal Malaysian Navy to equip the following ships:
  - Lekiu-class frigates
  - Kasturi-class corvettes
  - Gagah Samudera-class training ships

United Kingdom

- The Royal Navy uses the system to equip the following ships:
  - Type 45 destroyer
  - Sandown-class minehunters
  - Hunt-class mine countermeasures vessels
  - Bay-class landing ships
  - Tide-class tankers
