= Intermarine =

Italian shipbuilding company

Intermarine is an Italian shipbuilding company, owned by the Rodriquez Cantieri Navali Group.

== Company ==
Founded in 1970, Intermarine specializes in building boats and ships with fibre-reinforced plastic hulls.

In September 2002, the company was acquired by Rodriquez Cantieri Navali, a builder of high-speed vessels. That led to Intermarine introducing ships which are built with steel and aluminum, using technology from its parent company. RCN owns four shipyards on the west coast of Italy and Intermarine has access to them for production. A shipyard was operated in the United States by the subcompany Intermarine USA after the purchase of the Sayler Marine Corporation shipyard in Savannah, Georgia in 1987; but with the 2002 acquisition by Rodriquez, that yard was no longer owned by the company.

As of December 2015, business mainly consists of the contract with the Italian Navy for a total of 176 million euros relating to the modernization of eight Gaeta-class minesweepers, and the contract with the Finnish Navy for the supply of three minesweepers and related logistic package, from the contract with Orizzonte Sistemi Navali for the supply of a navigating platform and a related logistic package.

== Products ==
Intermarine builds exclusively military ships in three designs:

- Minesweepers are ships designed for the disposal of mines and for which Intermarine's composite construction is well suited, as the high elasticity of a composite hull makes it flexible enough to absorb the energy from a mine blast at close range without significant damage. Intermarine has built 38 minesweepers for seven customers, including three under construction for the Finnish Navy.
- Intermarine built hydro-oceanographic catamarans for the Italian Navy; two were built for charting the seafloor.
- Intermarine began producing patrol boats. Five patrol boats are under construction, but none have yet been delivered. They have either composite or aluminum hulls and are capable of speeds above 50 knots.

== Ships ==
- Italian Navy: Lerici-class minehunter
- Finnish Navy: Katanpää-class mine countermeasure vessel

== See also ==
- Azimut Yachts
- Benetti
- Fincantieri
