= Thales Australia =

Defence contractor based in Australia

- Type: Subsidiary
- Industry: Aerospace & Space, Defence, Security, Transport
- Founded: 2002; 24 years ago
- Headquarters: Sydney, Australia
- Key people: Belinda Hutchinson (chairwoman); Jeff Connolly (CEO Australia / New Zealand)
- Revenue: A$ around 1 billion (2014)
- Number of employees: 3800 (2023)
- Parent: Thales Group

Thales Australia (formerly Australian Defence Industries and ADI Limited) is a defence contractor based in Australia. It is a subsidiary of the French defence technology conglomerate Thales Group.

Thales Australia had been engaged in numerous programmes in conjunction with the Australian Defence Force, as well as overseas operators. It specialises in the design and delivery of various systems, products and services for both commercial and defence sectors.

== Services ==
The company can trace its roots back to the 1890s. It gradually developed its industrial base and grew to become a major indigenous defence specialist, handling the design, manufacture, and through-life support of various defence systems. Accordingly, the firm, previously known as Australian Defence Industries (ADI) has operated numerous long-term contracts with the Australian government and the Australian Defence Forces alike.

For many years, ADI was the sole indigenous defence contractor in Australia; however, a rival in the form of Tenix Defence was created as a subsidiary of Tenix Group company in 1997. While at one point Tenix Defence had displaced ADI as the biggest military contractor in the nation, British defence firm BAE Systems completed the acquisition of Tenix Defence during June 2008 in exchange for A$775 million (£373 million).

As ADI, the company manufactured various small arms, including the Steyr AUG-based EF88 Austeyr assault rifle at the Lithgow Small Arms Factory, along with a variety of smokeless powders for reloading rifle, pistol & shotgun cartridges. ADI was also a major producer of Australian armoured vehicles, such as the Bushmaster and Hawkei; it developed region-specific modifications for imported military vehicles as well. The production of the Bushmaster reportedly comprised over a quarter of the firm's export sales during 2009.

Throughout much of the company's existence, ADI was based on Garden Island Naval Base in Sydney, it also maintained a R&D/Custom production facility in Brisbane. During 2004, ADI controversially applied to the Australian Equal Opportunities Commission to exclude workers of certain nationalities for security reasons.

During October 2006, it was announced that the Australian federal government had permitted the regional conglomerate Transfield Holdings to sell their 50% shareholding in ADI to the Thales Group's Australian holdings, the Australian branch of the French military engineering firm. Accordingly, all ADI operations have been acquired by the company, which is now known as Thales Australia.

Thales Australia is perhaps best known for its naval ship repair operations and, as of 2019, leases the Captain Cook Graving Dock at Garden Island Naval Base in Sydney and also leases and occupies many of the buildings there. ADI's large site in St Marys in Western Sydney is progressively being repatriated for residential development with their munitions capability being consolidated in Benalla, Victoria and their testing facilities being sold to Vipac Engineers and Scientists. In addition to the supply of complete warships, Thales Australia handles the integration of various elements of naval equipment, including radar, sonar, communications, optronics and electronic warfare systems, in addition to miscellaneous support services.

By 2010, Thales Australia reportedly employed 3,300 people spread across 35 sites, the majority of which were based in New South Wales and Victoria. At the same time, roughly 65 per cent of the firm's activity was within the defence sector, with transport, security, and aerospace comprising the remainder. By 2020, the company had opened two additional sites and had 3,900 employees throughout Australia.

Thales Australia has been involved in various aerospace programmes, having specialised in avionics and aerospace-grade electronics. By 2010, the firm was engaged in the Eurocopter Tiger and NHIndustries NH90 helicopter programmes, serving as the major maintenance, spares and systems supplier on behalf of the Australian Defence Force. It has also been a supplier of various avionics and subsystems, including digital mapping, navigation, communications, electronic warfare systems, mission computers, flight simulators, sonar and mine detection apparatus. The company has developed a range of solutions for the air traffic control function.

By the 2010s, one growing sector of the firm has been its services division. Thales Australia has delivered various programmes related to mass transportation and public infrastructure, including the Auckland Public Transport Ticketing system, designing and implementing open road tolling infrastructure, and gas turbine containerisation. Transport-specific services include command and control systems, railway signalling, security, and communications solutions. Thales Australia also offers numerous security-related services, including secure communications, infrastructure security, border protection technologies, ID management, and cryptology.

On 29 June 2020, Thales Australia agreed to enter into a joint tenancy, alongside NIOA, of the government-owned munitions factory in Benalla, in addition to continuing its sole tenancy of the government-owned propellant factory in Mulwala.
