= List of ship decommissionings in 2008 =

The list of ship decommissionings in 2008 includes a chronological list of ships decommissioned in 2008. In cases where no official decommissioning ceremony was held, the date of withdrawal from service may be used instead.

Date	Operator	Ship	Class and type	Fate and other notes
February 18	Royal Navy	Sir Bedivere	Round Table-class landing ship logistics	Sold to Brazil as Almirante Saboia
April 23	Royal Danish Navy	Agdlek	Agdlek-class cutter cutter	Sold at auction for 2,725,000 Danish kroner
June 15	United States Navy	Osprey	Osprey-class coastal minehunter	
June 15	United States Navy	Robin	Osprey-class coastal minehunter	
August 28	United States Navy	Minneapolis-Saint Paul	Los Angeles-class submarine	
November 19	Italian Navy	Carabiniere	Alpino-class frigate	
