= USS Shrike =

USS Shrike is a name used more than once by the United States Navy:

- USS Shrike (AM-50), a planned Lapwing-class minesweeper from Baltimore Dry Dock and Shipbuilding Company; construction canceled 4 December 1918
- USS Shrike (AMS-201), laid down on 1 September 1953 by Tampa Marine Co., Tampa, Florida.
- USS Shrike (MHC-62), an Osprey-class minehunter, built by Northrop Grumman Ship Systems in the 1990s.
