= List of ship decommissionings in 2007 =

The list of ship decommissionings in 2007 includes a chronological list of all ships decommissioned in 2007.

	Operator	Ship	Flag	Class and type	Fate	Other notes
7 January	United States Navy	Cardinal		Osprey-class coastal minehunter	Active	Sold to Egypt
7 January	United States Navy	Raven		Osprey-class coastal minehunter	Active	Sold to Egypt
15 January	United States Navy	Dolphin			On memorial/museum hold	
15 January	Japan Maritime Self-Defense Force	Tachikaze		Tachikaze-class destroyer		
17 January	United States Navy	Trenton			Active	Sold to India
23 January	Royal New Zealand Navy	Hinau				
23 January	Royal New Zealand Navy	Moa				
21 February	United States Navy	Ogden			Awaiting disposal	
13 March	Royal Australian Navy	Gladstone			Gifted	To Gladstone Maritime History Society
23 March	United States Navy	John F. Kennedy		Modified Kitty Hawk-class aircraft carrier	Inactive	Inactive Ship Maintenance Facility Philadelphia, Pennsylvania
25 April	United States Navy	Saipan			Awaiting disposal	
11 May	Royal Australian Navy	Townsville			Museum	Townsville Maritime Museum
11 May	Royal Australian Navy	Ipswich			Awaiting disposal	
4 June	Chilean Navy	Almirante Lynch				Sold to Ecuador
26 September	United States Navy	Shreveport		Austin-class amphibious transport dock	Inactive	Inactive Ship Maintenance Facility Philadelphia, Pennsylvania
