= USS Pioneer (MCM-9) =

Avenger-class mine countermeasures ship of the United States Navy

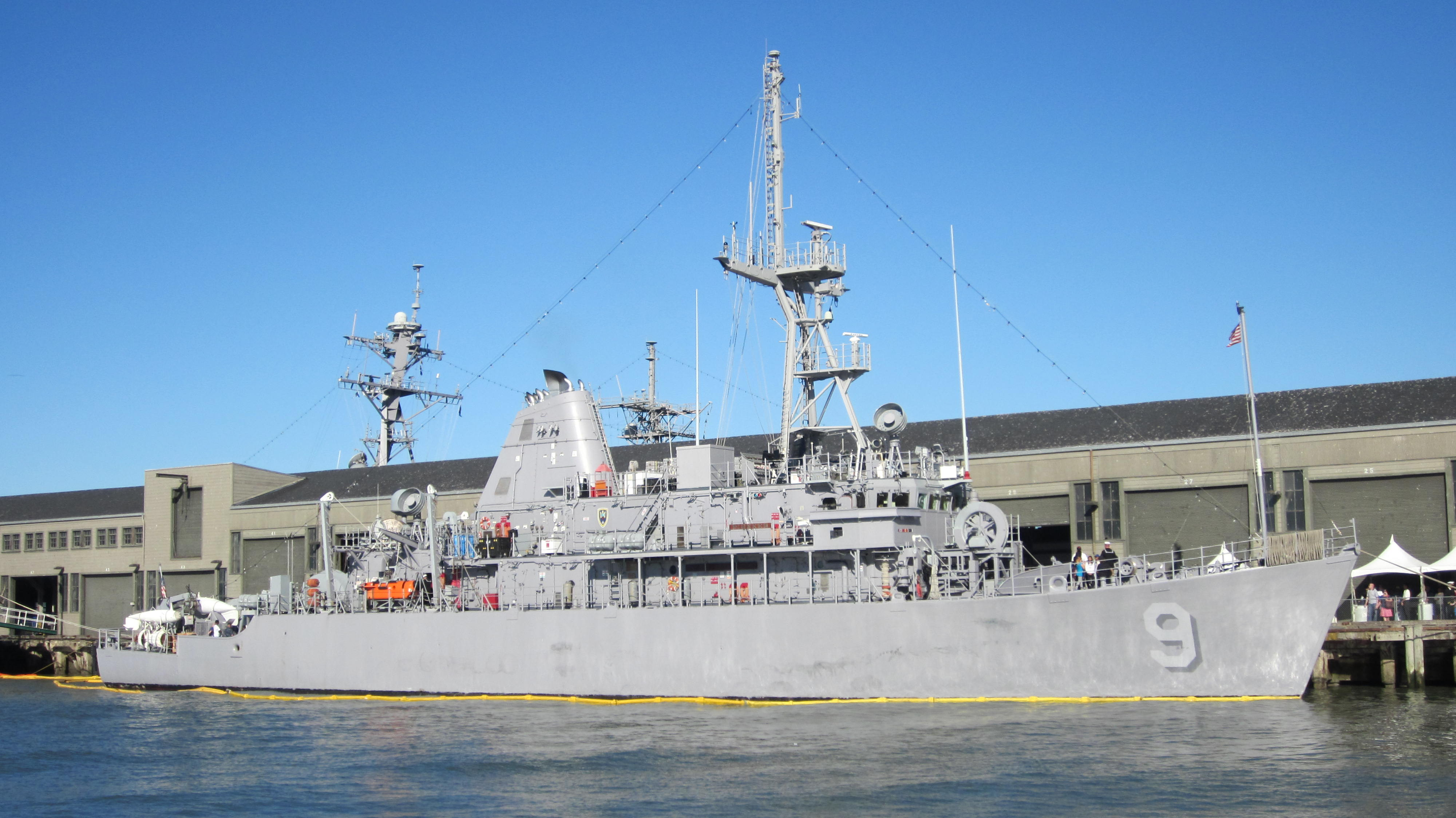
- USS Pioneer (MCM-9)

History

United States
- Name: USS Pioneer
- Builder: Peterson Builders Inc., Sturgeon Bay, Wisconsin
- Laid down: 5 June 1989
- Launched: 25 August 1990
- Acquired: 14 August 1990
- Commissioned: 7 December 1992
- Home port: United States Fleet Activities Sasebo, Japan
- Motto: Praecursor Pro Libertate; ("Pioneer for Freedom")
- Nickname(s): The Mighty Nine
- Status: in active service
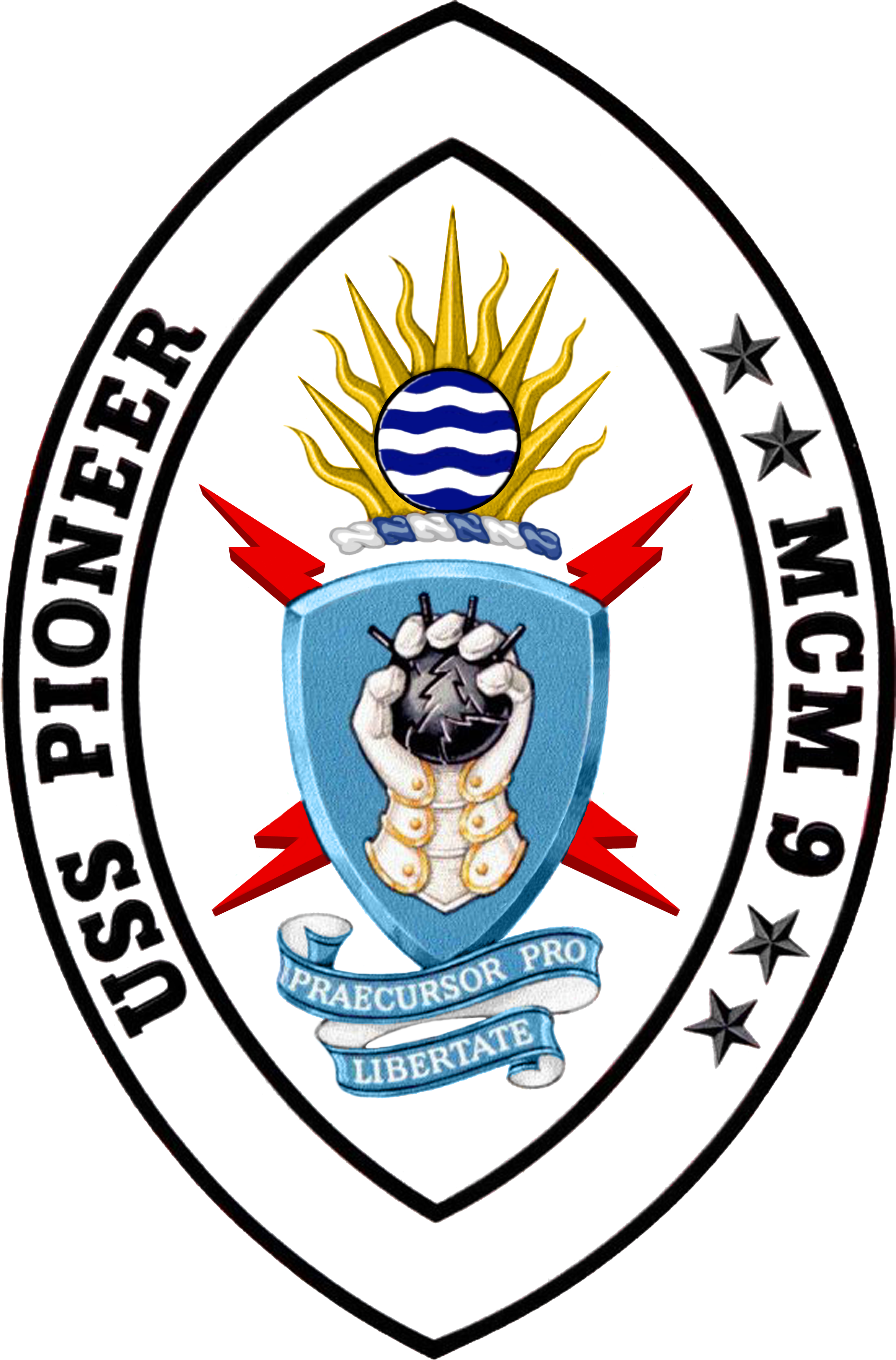
- Badge

General characteristics
- Class & type: Avenger-class mine countermeasures ship
- Displacement: 1,367 long tons (1,389 t)
- Length: 224 ft (68 m) o/a
- Beam: 39 ft (12 m)
- Draft: 13 ft (4.0 m)
- Propulsion: 4 × Isotta-Fraschini austenitic steel non-magnetic diesel engines; 2 × controllable/reversible pitch propellers; 2 × rudders; 2 × light-load electric motors
- Speed: 14 knots (26 km/h; 16 mph)
- Complement: 6 officers and 75 enlisted
- Sensors & processing systems: AN/SLQ-48 (V) Mine Neutralization System; AN/SQL-37 (V) 3 Magnetic/Acoustic Influence Minesweeping Gear; Oropesa type 0 size 1 Mechanical Sweep Equipment; MDG 1701 Marconi Magnetometer Degaussing System
- Electronic warfare & decoys: AN/SSN-2 Precise Integrated Navigation System (PINS); AN/SQQ-32 Mine-hunting sonar; AN/SPS-55 Surface Radar; AN/WSN-2 Gyro Compass
- Armament: 2 × Double M2 Browning .50-cal machine guns; 2 × M60 7.62 mm machine guns; 2 × Mk 19 grenade launchers

USS Pioneer (MCM-9) is an Avenger-class mine countermeasures ship of the United States Navy. It is the ninth ship of the class, and the second Navy ship of that name.

Pioneer was laid down by Peterson Builders, Inc., Sturgeon Bay, Wisconsin, on 5 June 1989. Mrs. Sally McGuire Tobin christened the ship on 25 August 1990. Construction and fitting out progressed on schedule and, on 14 August 1990, Lieutenant Commander Jerald Tyler Ballance, USNR, accepted Pioneer on behalf of the Navy from Mr. Ellsworth Peterson of Peterson Builders. Pioneer began her commissioned service on 1 September 1992 and, after completing initial crew training, sailed to her new homeport of NS Ingleside, Texas. Pioneer was formally commissioned on 7 December 1992, a tribute to the many U.S. servicemen who had served at Pearl Harbor.

== Service history ==
In January 1993, Pioneer began an intense shakedown year filled with numerous evaluations, training periods, exercises, and inspections. These included the first major mine warfare exercise in the western Gulf of Mexico, two visits to the Magnetic Silencing Facility in Charleston, South Carolina, port visits to Port Canaveral and Port Everglades, Florida, an Operational Propulsion Plant Examination, Combat Systems Qualification and Testing in Panama City, Florida, mine sweeping performance trials, Final Contract Trials, and a Logistic Management Assessment. For the remainder of 1993 and throughout 1994, Pioneer continued her aggressive training cycle and conducted post-shakedown maintenance, repairs, and pre-deployment exercises.

In February 1995, Pioneer set sail for Europe on her maiden cruise. During this deployment, Pioneer participated in Exercise Blue Harrier '95 and visited Bermuda, Portsmouth England, Aarhus Denmark, Kiel Germany, Russia, Azores, La Spezia Italy, and Cartagena, Spain, Palma de Mallorca and Benidorm Spain. During her visit to St. Petersburg, the Pioneer and her crew were greeted by hundreds of Russians; eager to see the Americans that had arrived to participate in the 50th Anniversary of V-E day. She returned to Ingleside in August and, after a well-deserved break, began her next training cycle.

In January 1996, Pioneer joined Warrior, Gladiator, and Chief as a training ship for the Mine Force's Rotational Crews. For the next four years, the Navy's eight Mine Countermeasures Rotational Crews conducted their pre-deployment training in these Ingleside-based ships before completing a six-month deployment in the Persian Gulf in Ardent or Dextrous. But by early 2000, the Navy no longer crewed its forward-deployed MCM ships with rotational crews, and on 20 January 2000, the remaining members of MCM Rotational Crew BRAVO embarked in Pioneer—a ship they knew well—as her permanent crew. Pioneer now serves in Mine Countermeasures Squadron 1 (MCMRon 1), the squadron responsible for planning and overseeing the Navy's Mine Countermeasures operations in the Western Pacific.

The crew moved aboard and quickly made the ship their home by resealing decks, painting, and generally taking ownership. Along with this came a plethora of repairs and upgrades, which increased Pioneer's material readiness. Pioneer then completed a successful CART II and N43 visit and made its way to Panama City, Florida for a Squadron 1 exercise. En route to this exercise, LCDR Samuel Norton relieved CDR Clay Harris as Commanding Officer of Pioneer. The crew remained focussed and performed admirably during the Mine Warfare Exercise. Following a brief port visit to Tampa, Florida, the ship returned to Ingleside, Texas to complete preparations for another mine warfare exercise (GOMEX 2000). Pioneer participated in the exercise off the coast of Corpus Christi, Texas and the ship and crew's performance was outstanding. With precision and polish, they led the way for mine countermeasures. Members of Explosive Ordnance Disposal Mobile Unit 3's Detachment 15 aided Pioneer in this task.

Pioneer then prepared to make its first extended underway period with a permanent crew since 1995. On 12 September 2000 Pioneer set off for Beaumont, Texas for Navy Days, its first stop on an East Coast cruise. During this period Pioneer participated in Unified Spirit 2000, a multi-national exercise off the coast of North Carolina. Pioneer again identified and neutralized its fair share of mines, aided by members of Fleet Diving Unit Atlantic 8, a Canadian Explosive Ordnance Disposal dive team. The crew worked well with the divers, and claimed a few victories with its Mine Neutralization Vehicle, performing the first live activation of a Mission Package One cutter arm since USS Pioneer gained its permanent crew, bringing a moored mine safely to the surface and completing the neutralization and recovery.

Pioneer then began her journey back to homeport, stopping again in NAB Little Creek, Virginia and briefly in Key West, Florida en route to Mobile, Alabama—the last stop before returning to Ingleside. In Mobile Pioneer was once again greeted by the southern hospitality for the members of the Mobile Navy League and the people of Mobile as a whole. Pioneer said goodbye to Mobile as she traveled to Ingleside, Texas returning on 15 December 2000.

Following the landfall of Hurricane Katrina in 2005, Pioneer was ordered out-to-sea as a part of Joint Task Force Katrina. During her underway time, Pioneer was tasked with conducting sonar sweeps and maritime safety checks of the shipping lanes off the coast of Louisiana, Alabama and Mississippi. The ship and crew, MCM Crew Exultant, were awarded the Humanitarian Service Medal for their work during the operation.

== Awards ==
- Meritorious Unit Commendation
- Battle E x5
- Humanitarian Service Medal - (2015; Hurricane Katrina)
- Marjorie Sterrett Battleship Fund Award - (2020)
