= USS Heron (MHC-52) =

American minehunter

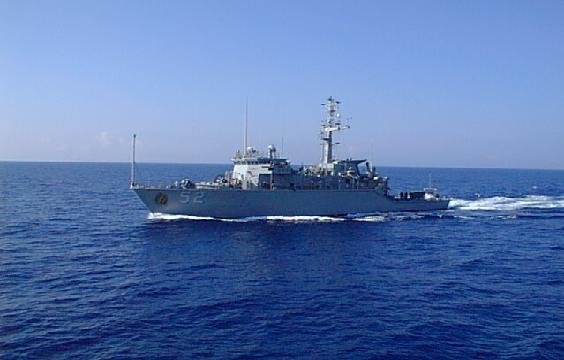

History

United States
- Name: USS Heron
- Namesake: Heron
- Awarded: 17 February 1989
- Builder: Intermarine USA, Savannah, Georgia
- Laid down: 11 October 1989
- Launched: 21 March 1992
- Completed: 22 July 1994
- Commissioned: 6 August 1994
- Decommissioned: 16 March 2007
- Stricken: 16 March 2007
- Identification: MHC-52
- Fate: Sold to Greece, 16 March 2007
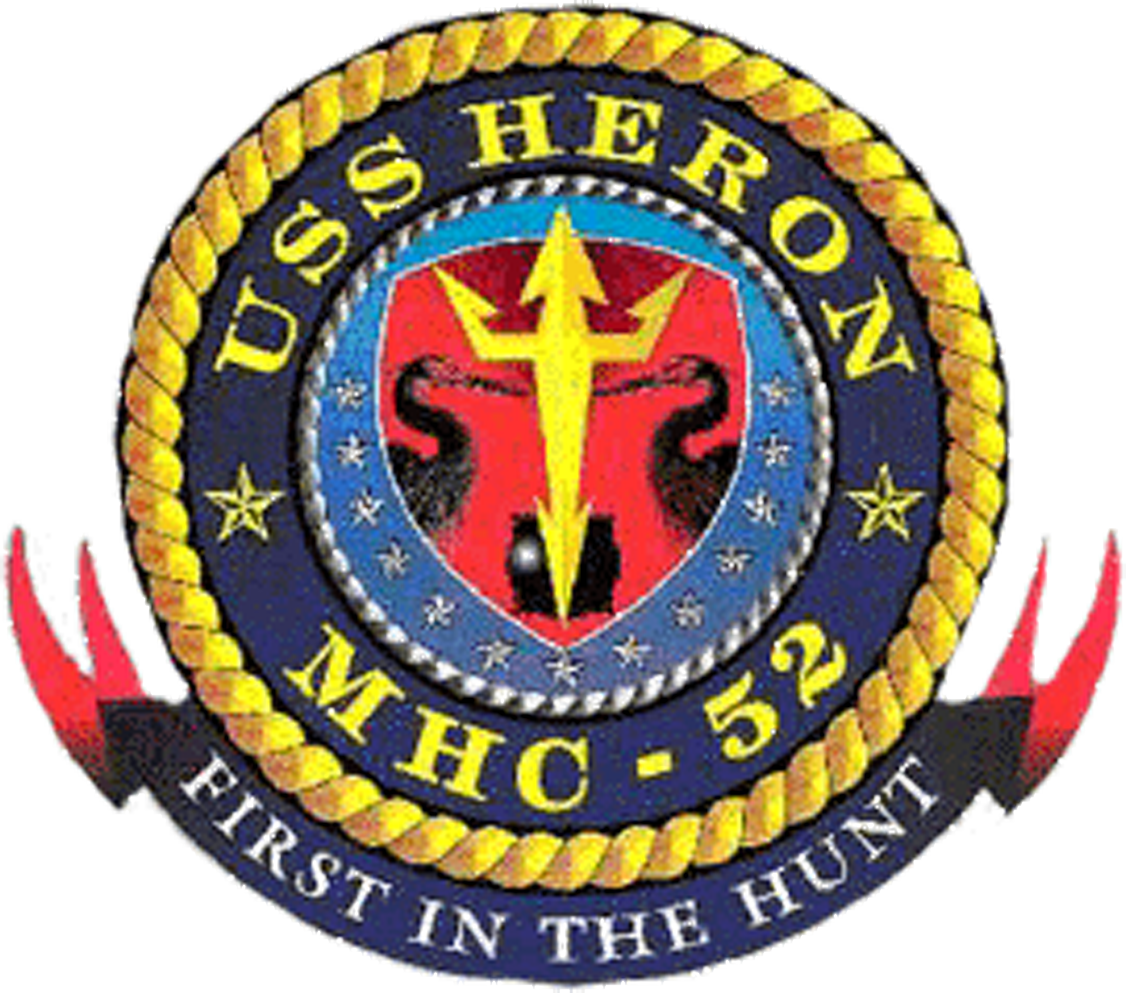
- Badge

Greece
- Name: Kalypso
- Acquired: 16 March 2007
- Identification: M64
- Fate: in active service

General characteristics
- Class & type: Osprey-class minehunter
- Displacement: 839 tons (light) 926 tons (full)
- Length: 188 ft (57 m)
- Beam: 38 ft (12 m)
- Draft: 11 ft (3.4 m)
- Complement: Officers: 5 Enlisted: 46

USS Heron (MHC-52) is the second ship of Osprey-class minehunter.

She was transferred to the Hellenic Navy under a foreign military sales agreement on 16 March 2007 and then renamed Kalipso.
