= USS Avenger (MCM-1) =

Avenger-class mine countermeasures ship

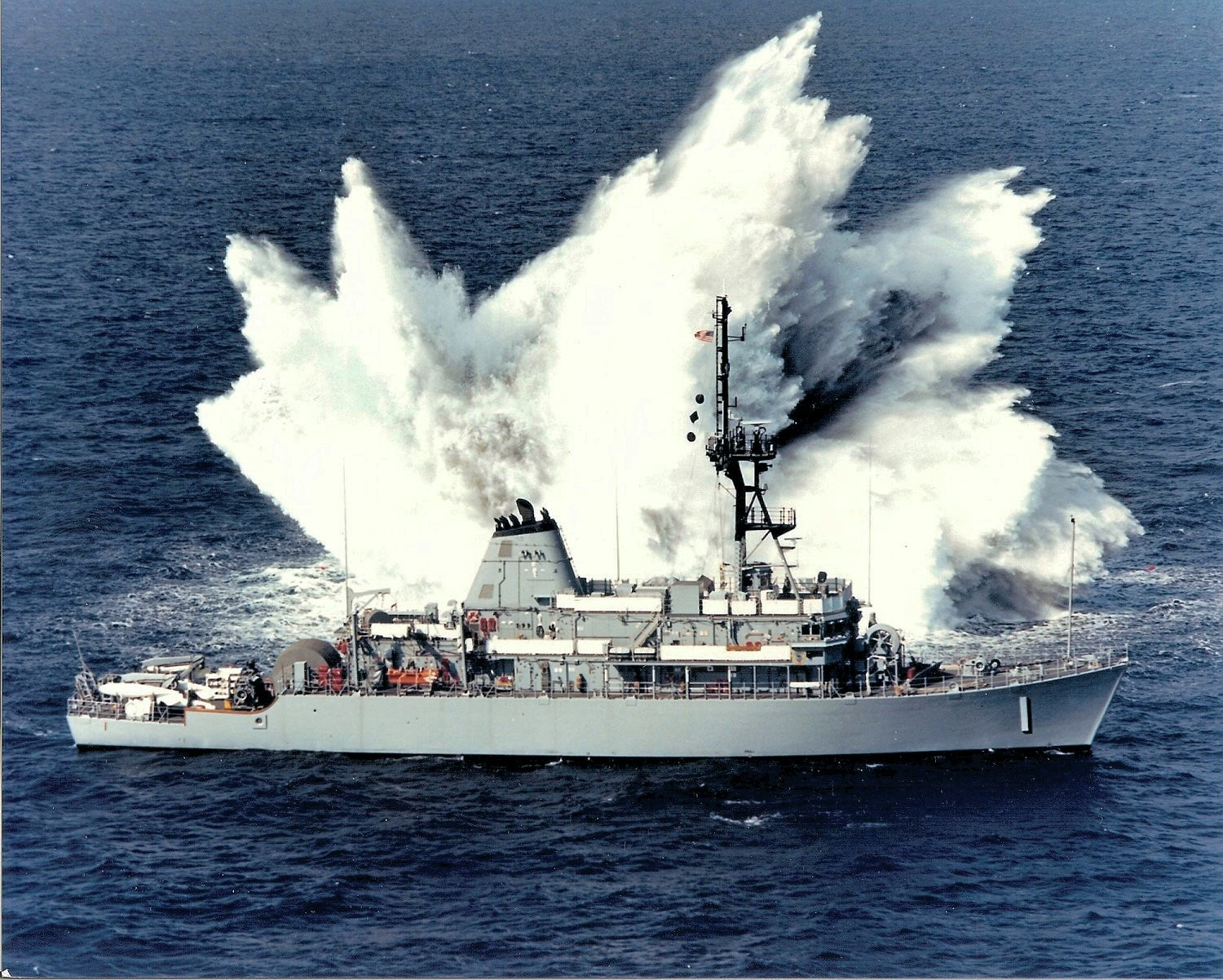
- Avenger undergoing shock test

History

United States
- Name: USS Avenger
- Ordered: 29 June 1982
- Builder: Peterson Shipbuilders
- Laid down: 3 June 1983
- Launched: 15 June 1985
- Commissioned: 12 September 1987
- Decommissioned: 30 September 2014
- Home port: Sasebo, Japan
- Motto: Dux et Defensor Semitae; ("Guide & Defender of the Pathway")
- Status: In reserve in the Pacific Reserve Fleet as of 2019
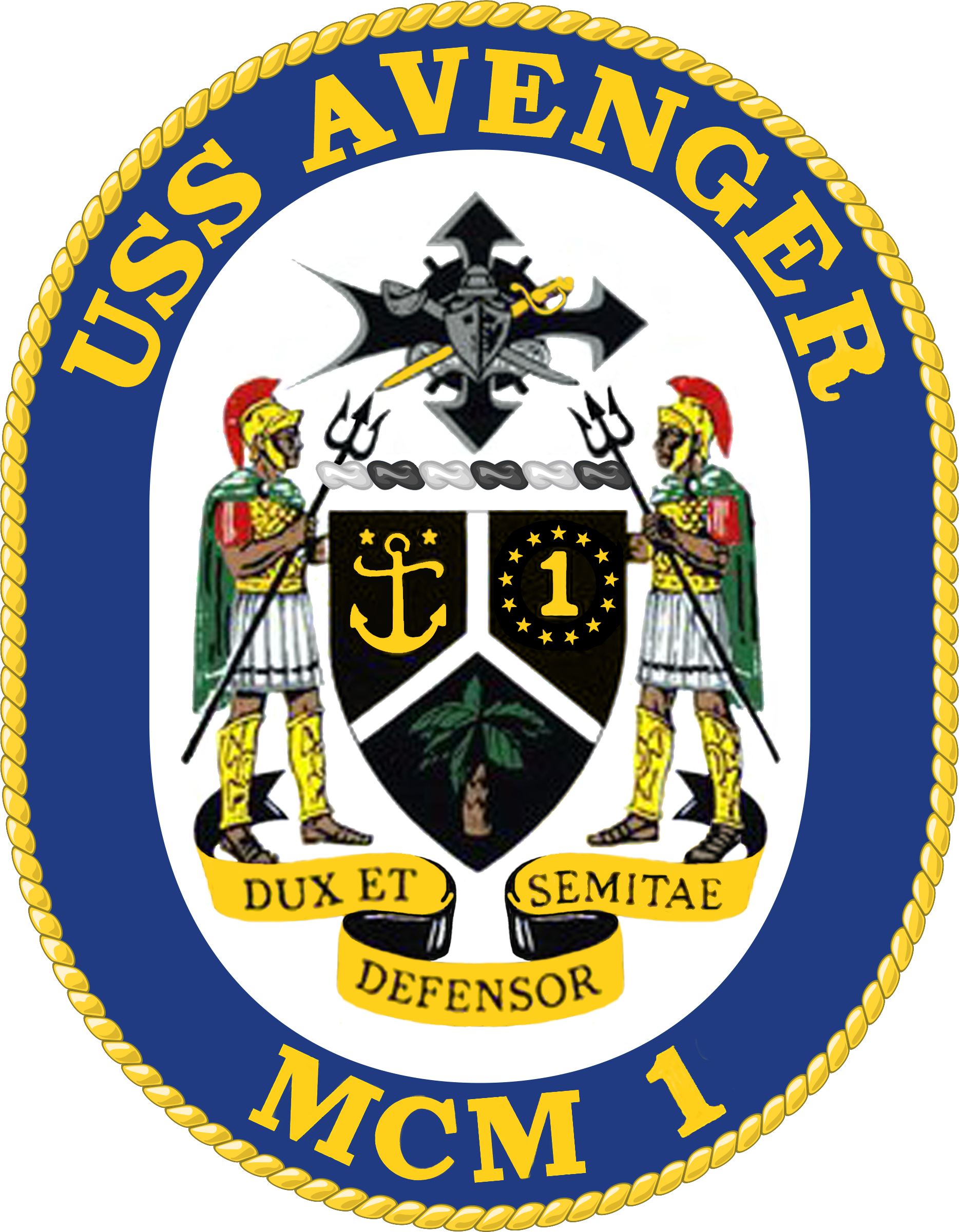
- Badge

General characteristics
- Class & type: Avenger-class mine countermeasures ship
- Displacement: 1,367 tons (1,390 t)
- Length: 224 ft (68 m) overall
- Beam: 39 ft (12 m)
- Draft: 13 ft (4.0 m)
- Propulsion: 4 × Waukesha diesel engines, 2 × controllable/reversible pitch propellers, 2 × rudders, 2 × light-load electric motors
- Speed: 14 knots (26 km/h; 16 mph)
- Complement: 6 officers, 75 enlisted
- Sensors & processing systems: AN/SSN-2 Precise Integrated Navigation System (PINS), AN/SQQ-32 Mine Hunting Sonar, AN/SPS-73 Surface Radar, AN/WSN-7B Ring Laser Gyro
- Armament: Mine hunting equipment: AN/SLQ-48(V) Mine Neutralization System, AN/SLQ-37(V)3 Magnetic/Acoustic Influence Minesweeping Gear, Oropesa type 0 size 1 Mechanical Sweep Equipment, MDG 1701 Marconi Magnetometer Degaussing System, Armament: 4 × M2HB .50-cal machine guns, 2 × M60 7.62 mm machine guns, 2 × Mk 19 grenade launchers

USS Avenger (MCM-1) was the lead ship of her class of mine countermeasures ship, and the third U.S. Navy ship of that name.

== Service history ==
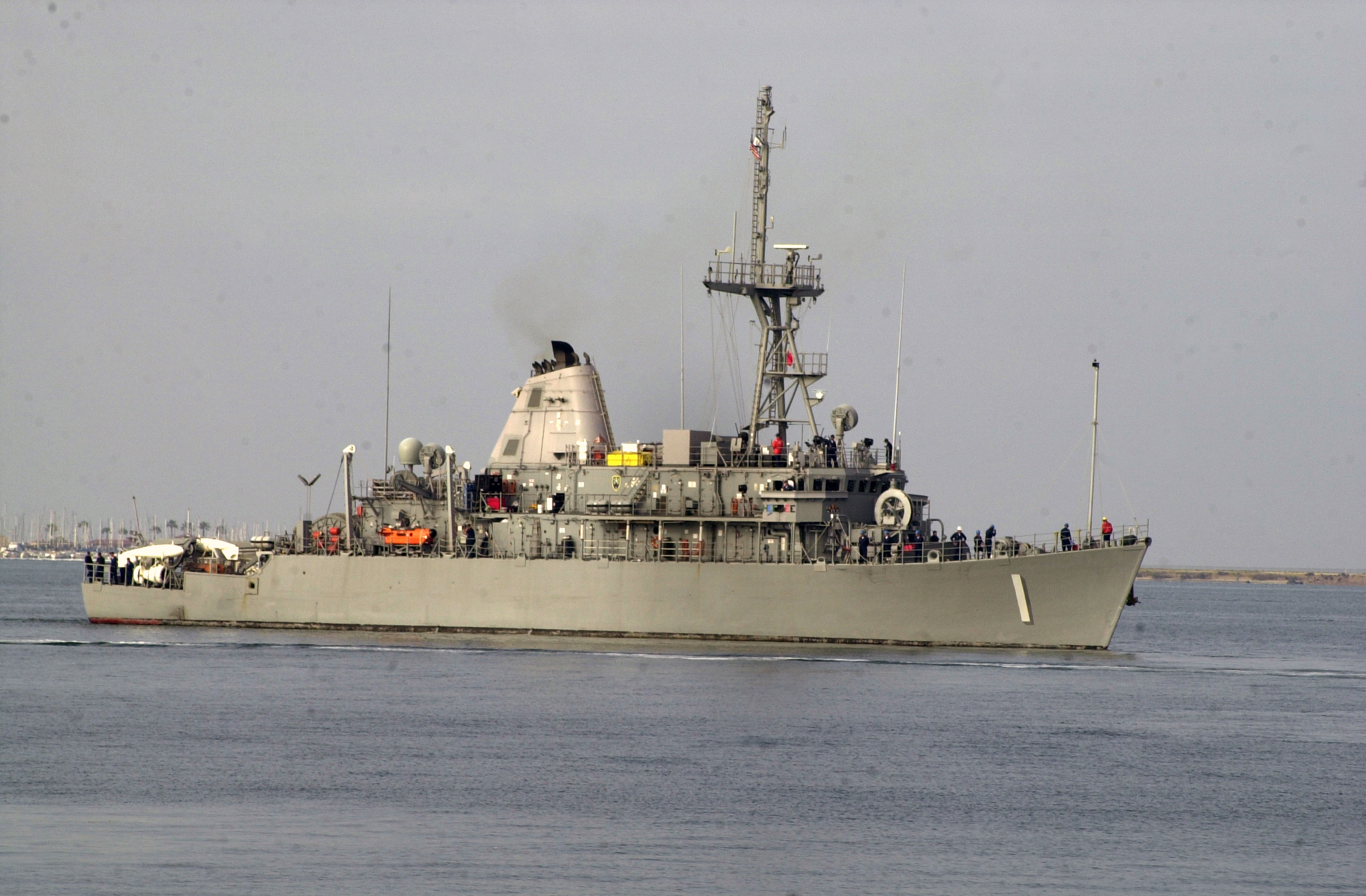
USS Avenger leaving San Diego Naval Base, 16 April 2004.

Avenger was ordered on 29 June 1982, laid down on 3 June 1983 by the Peterson Shipbuilders Co., Sturgeon Bay, Wisc., launched on 15 June 1985, and commissioned on 12 September 1987.

Subsequent to her commissioning and a period of test and trials, Avenger arrived in her homeport of NS Charleston, South Carolina, and began operating as a member of the U.S. Atlantic Fleet. Following the 1990 Iraqi invasion of Kuwait, Avenger deployed to the Persian Gulf as a coalition force member in support of Operation Desert Shield and Desert Storm on 16 August 1990. Avenger was the longest-serving ship from all of the coalition forces during the Shield/Storm conflict, as well as the first ship in the history of naval warfare to locate and neutralize bottom mines. Avenger was awarded the Navy Unit Commendation and Combat Action Ribbon for her wartime accomplishments.

In 1993, Avenger shifted homeports to the newly constructed Naval Station Ingleside, Texas. Since that time she deployed to the Eastern Atlantic in 1993 and 1995, Mediterranean Sea in 1997 and 1999. In 2001 Avenger deployed to the Eastern Pacific via the Panama Canal and conducted Joint, Combined, and Bilateral exercises and operations on the West Coast. Late in 2001, Avenger conducted test operations of a revolutionary jam-resistant electronic navigation system. In 2004, the Avenger deployed to participate in the Rim of the Pacific Exercise (RIMPAC), and in October of that year the ship returned to her homeport of Ingleside, Texas. Avenger completed her most significant modernization in the summer of 2008. In 2009, Avenger shifted her homeport to San Diego and then in December became permanently forward deployed to Sasebo, Japan. Later that same year the ship commenced her first deployment around the western Pacific.

On 30 September 2014, USS Avenger was decommissioned at San Diego, California. As of 2019, she is a part of the Pacific Reserve Fleet.

== Awards ==
- Navy Unit Commendation
- Combat Action Ribbon
- National Defense Service Medal with star
- Southwest Asia Service Medal with three campaign stars
- Global War on Terrorism Service Medal
- Navy Overseas Service Ribbon
- Sea Service Deployment Ribbon
- Kuwait Liberation Medal (Saudi Arabia)
- Kuwait Liberation Medal (Kuwait)
