= USS Scout (MCM-8) =

Avenger-class mine countermeasures ship

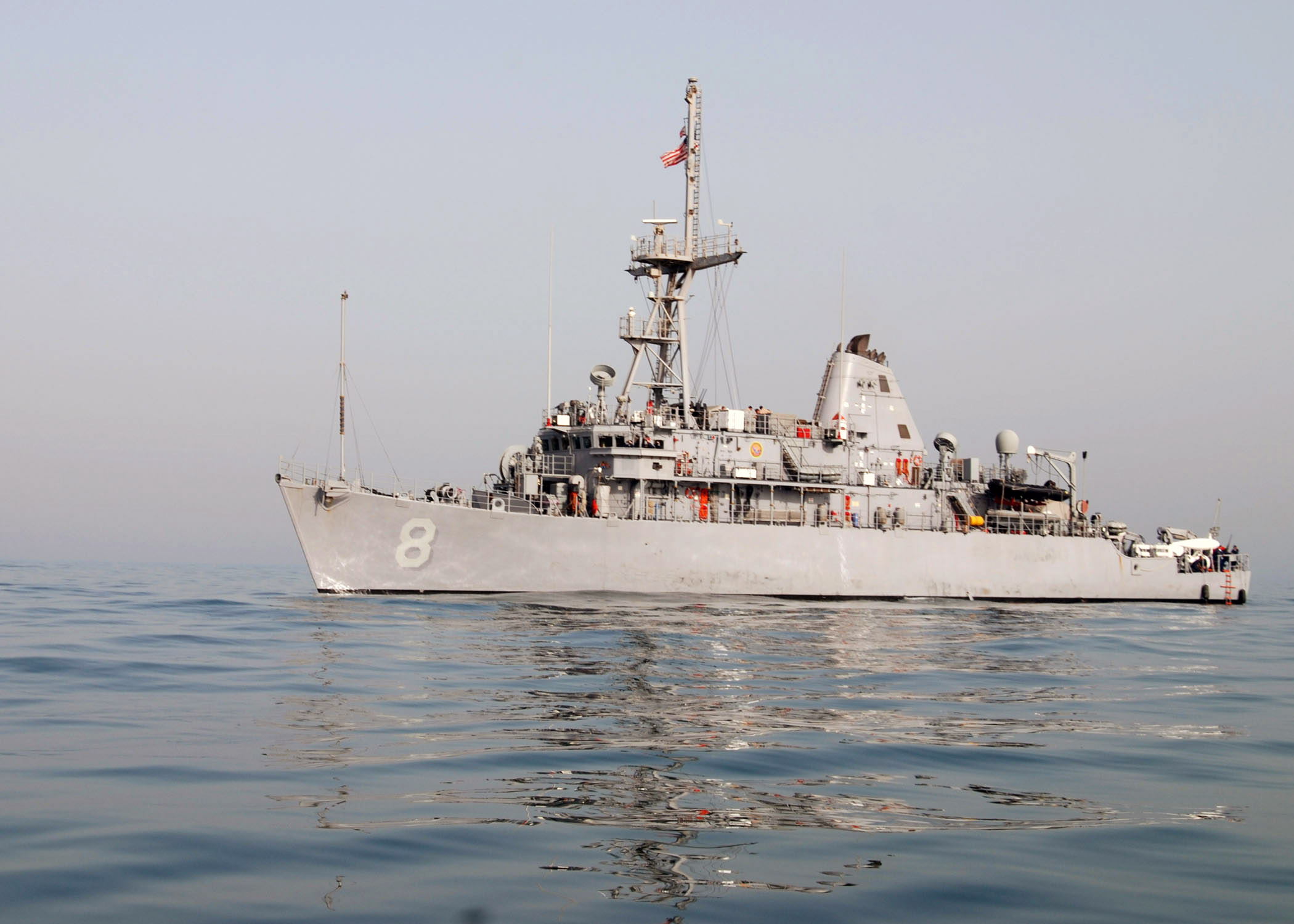
- Scout in the Persian Gulf, March 2008

History

United States
- Name: USS Scout
- Ordered: 20 August 1986
- Builder: Peterson Builders
- Laid down: 8 June 1987
- Launched: 20 May 1989
- Acquired: 27 November 1990
- Commissioned: 15 December 1990
- Decommissioned: 26 August 2020
- Identification: MCM-8
- Fate: unknown
- Status: decommissioned
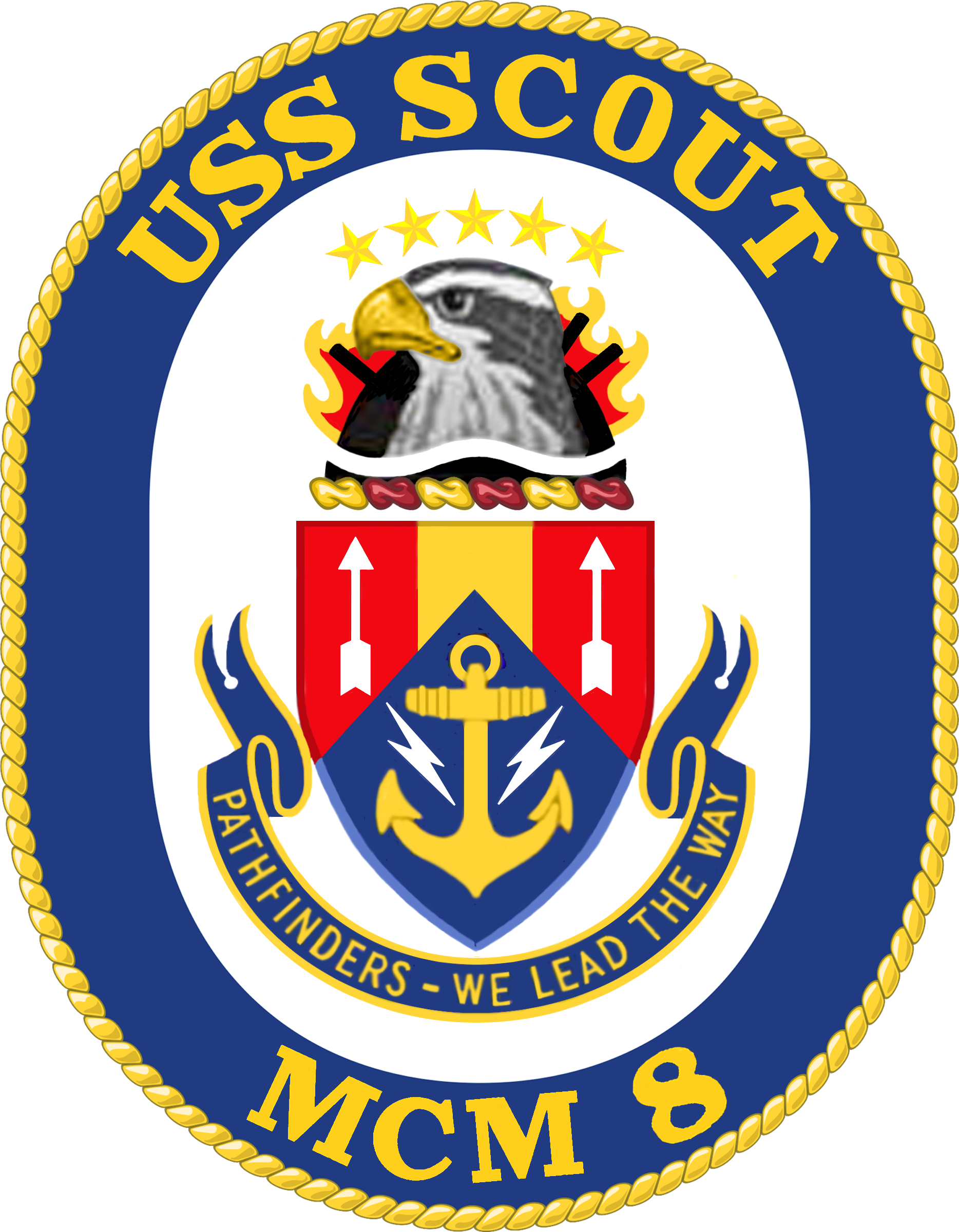
- Badge

General characteristics
- Class & type: Avenger-class mine countermeasures ship
- Displacement: 1,258 tons (light); 1,371 tons (full)
- Length: 224 ft (68 m) (LOA)
- Beam: 39 ft (12 m)
- Draft: 12 ft (3.7 m)
- Propulsion: four diesel engines, 2 screws
- Speed: 14 knots (26 km/h)
- Complement: 81
- Sensors & processing systems: AN/SSN-2 Precise Integrated Navigation System (PINS), AN/SQQ-32 Mine Hunting Sonar, AN/SPS-73 Surface Radar, AN/WSN-7B Gyro Compass
- Electronic warfare & decoys: AN/SLQ-48 (V) Mine Neutralization System, AN/SQL-37 (V) 3 Magnetic/Acoustic Influence Minesweeping Gear, AN/SQL-38 Oropesa type 0 size 1 Mechanical Sweep Equipment, MDG 1701 Marconi Magnetometer Degaussing System
- Armament: Four single mount M2HB .50 calibre machine guns as well as two M240B single mounts and one twin mount M240B.

The fourth USS Scout (MCM-8) is an Avenger-class mine countermeasures ship of the United States Navy.

== Service history ==
Scout was laid down on 8 June 1987 at Peterson Builders in Sturgeon Bay, Wisconsin. Launched on 20 May 1989, she was commissioned on 15 December 1990.

The Avenger-class ships were designed to have very low acoustic and magnetic signatures to avoid detonating mines. While most modern warships have steel hulls, the Avengers have wooden hulls with an external coating of fiberglass. They are equipped with sophisticated minehunting and classification sonar as well as remotely operated mine neutralization and disposal systems.

On 25 June 1992, Scout was the first ship to arrive at the newly established Naval Station Ingleside, center of the Navy's Mine Warfare operations.

While on a five-month deployment in the Mediterranean during 1999, Scout assisted in the evacuation of ethnic Albanians from war-torn Kosovo.

Scout deployed to the Mediterranean in early 2003 for a five-month tour in support of Operation Iraqi Freedom, returning on 13 June.

On 1 April 2005, Scout and her sister ship USS Devastator departed Naval Station Ingleside for a five-month deployment on the West Coast of the US, operating out of Naval Station San Diego. On 24 August, the Armed Forces Base Realignment and Closure Committee recommended closing Naval Station Ingleside and moving Navy Mine Warfare operations to Naval Station San Diego. The recommendation was signed into law on 9 November 2005, and planning for the base's closure has begun. Navy Mine Warfare operations are to be relocated to Naval Station San Diego.

In September 2005, Scout and several of her sister ships participated in relief efforts in the Gulf of Mexico following Hurricane Katrina. The mine countermeasure ships spent weeks surveying waterways around the Louisiana coast and offshore oil platforms, using their high-tech sonar systems to locate sunken debris that could pose a hazard to navigation.

On 18 February 2007 Scout arrived in Manama, Bahrain, where she remains forward deployed with the United States 5th Fleet. Scout was transported from Naval Station Ingleside aboard the semi-submersible heavy-lift ship Condock III, chartered by Military Sealift Command.

Scout participated in a mine countermeasures exercise with British forces in August 2007, where air, surface, and subsurface countermeasures were employed in the central Persian Gulf to locate, identify, and destroy planted dummy mines.

From 26 February to 6 March 2008 Scout participated in another mine countermeasures exercise in the northern Persian Gulf with British and Kuwaiti forces. During the exercise, Scout exchanged two sailors with the Royal Navy ship Blyth to foster interoperability between coalition forces engaged in mine warfare.

A decommissioning ceremony was held for Scout at Naval Base San Diego on 19 August 2020, and was officially decommissioned on 26th of the same month.

== Awards ==
In May 2004, Scout was the Atlantic Fleet winner of the Marjorie Sterrett Battleship Fund Award for overall readiness.
