= USS Robin (MHC-54) =

United States Navy minehunter

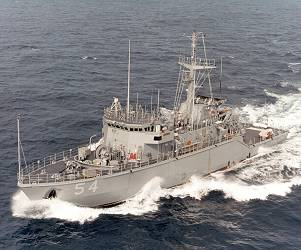
- USS Robin (MHC-54)

History

United States
- Name: USS Robin
- Namesake: Robin
- Awarded: 2 August 1990
- Builder: Avondale Shipyards
- Laid down: 2 June 1992
- Launched: 11 September 1993
- Commissioned: 11 May 1996
- Decommissioned: 15 June 2006
- Stricken: 15 June 2006
- Fate: Sold by U.S. General Services Administration for scrap, 08 May 2014
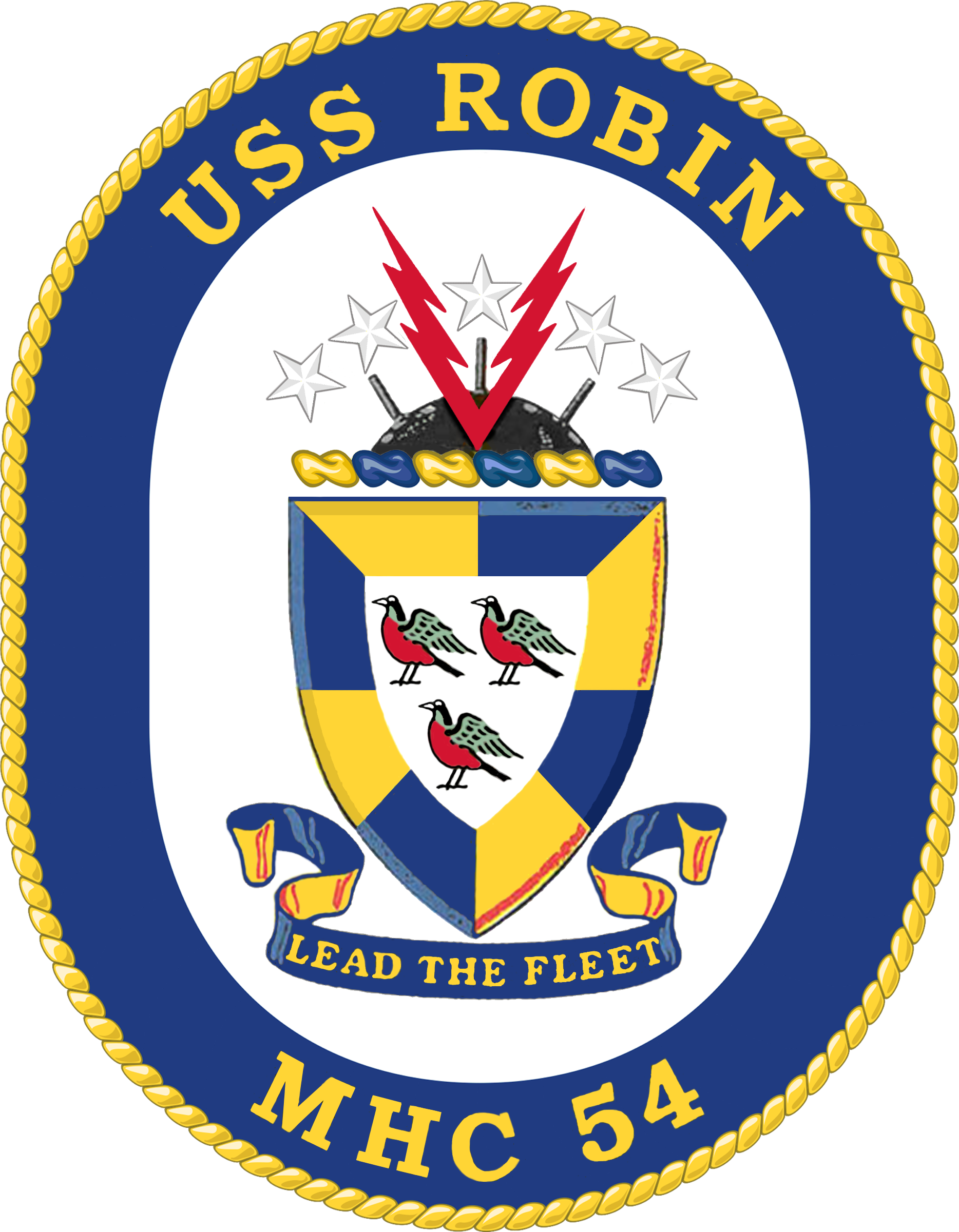
- Badge

General characteristics
- Class & type: Osprey-class coastal minehunter
- Displacement: 895 tons
- Length: 188 ft (57 m)
- Beam: 36 ft (11 m)
- Draft: 11 ft (3.4 m)
- Propulsion: Two diesels (800 hp each)
- Speed: 12 knots (22 km/h; 14 mph)
- Complement: 5 officers and 46 enlisted
- Armament: Mine neutralization system & two .50 cal (12.7 mm) machine guns

USS Robin (MHC-54) was an Osprey-class coastal minehunter in the United States Navy and is the fourth ship named for the robin. Robin's keel was laid on 2 June 1992 and she was commissioned on 11 May 1996, at Naval Station Ingleside, Ingleside, Texas. Struck from the Navy list 15 June 2006, sold by U.S. General Services Administration for scrap, 8 May 2014.
