= USS Falcon (MHC-59) =

United States naval ship

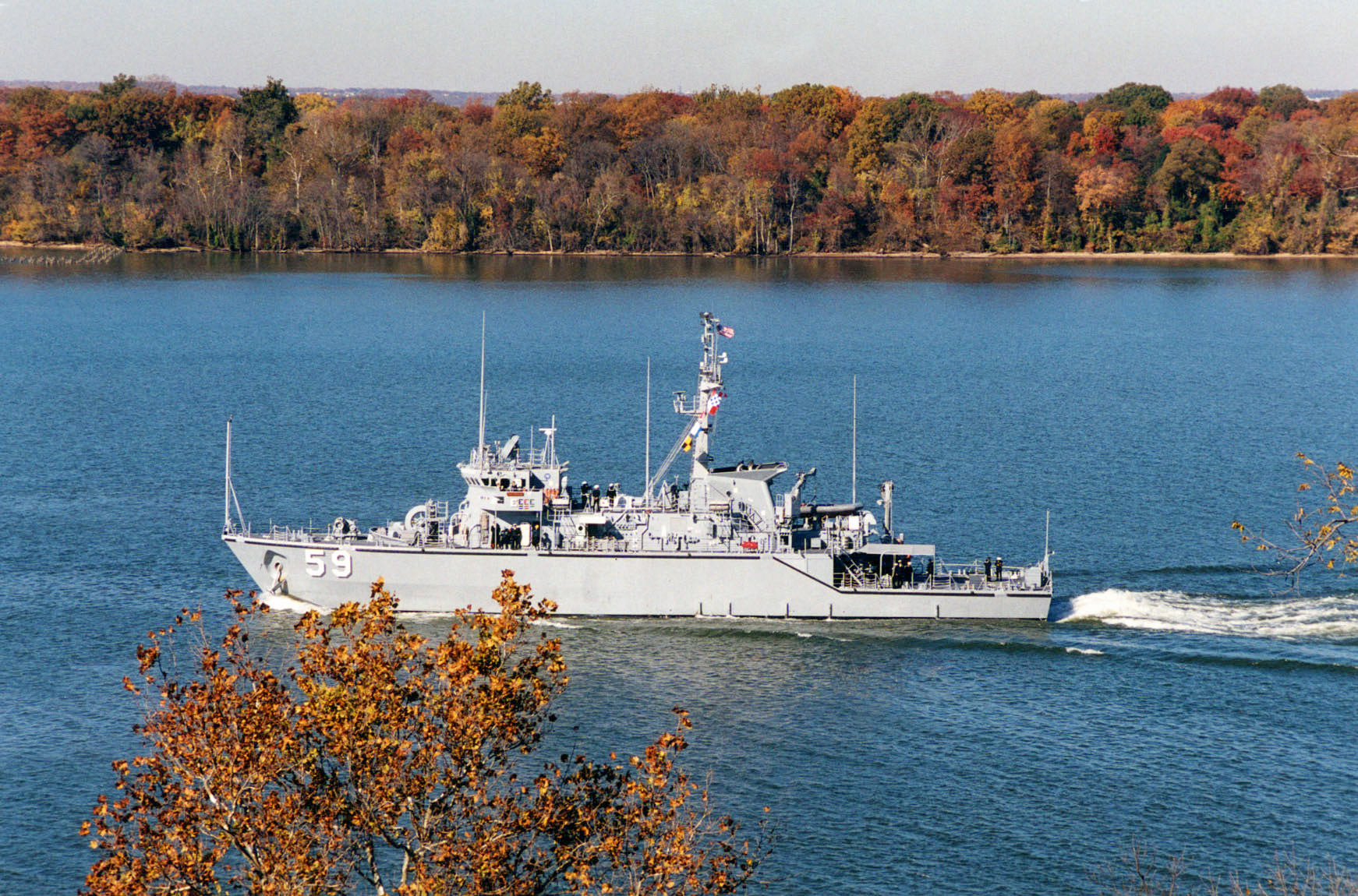
- USS Falcon on the Potomac River, 2000

History

United States
- Name: USS Falcon (MHC-59)
- Namesake: Falcon
- Awarded: 22 April 1992
- Builder: Intermarine USA
- Laid down: 1 July 1993
- Launched: 3 June 1995
- Acquired: 14 October 1996
- Commissioned: 8 February 1997
- Decommissioned: 30 June 2006
- Stricken: 30 June 2006
- Fate: Disposed of, by Navy Sale 23 May 2010

History

Taiwan
- Name: ROCS Yung An (MHC 1311)
- Acquired: 2 August 2012
- Commissioned: 10 August 2012
- Status: Active

General characteristics
- Class & type: Osprey-class coastal minehunter
- Displacement: 821 tons (light) 908 tons (full)
- Length: 188′ (57.3 m)
- Beam: 38′ (11.6 m)
- Draft: 11′ (3.4 m)
- Propulsion: Diesel Engines
- Complement: Officers: 5 Enlisted: 46

USS Falcon (MHC-59) is the ninth ship of Osprey-class coastal minehunters. She is named after the falcon.

== Construction and commissioning ==
She was laid down on 1 July 1993 in Savannah, Georgia by Intermarine USA. She was launched on 3 June 1995, sponsored by Lillian Budd Darden, wife of congressman George Washington Darden III, and commissioned on 8 February 1997 with lieutenant commander Peter J. Fanta in command.

== Service history ==
She would receive a Logistics Management Excellence Award for 2001 and a TYCOM surface ship safety award for 2002.

She would spend 4-14 September 2005 aiding in Hurricane Katrina relief efforts.

== Decommissioning ==
Falcon was decommissioned and stricken from the Naval Vessel Register on 30 June 2006, and sold to Taiwan on 23 May 2010. She now operates as ROCS Yung An (MHC-1311).
