= USS Oriole (MHC-55) =

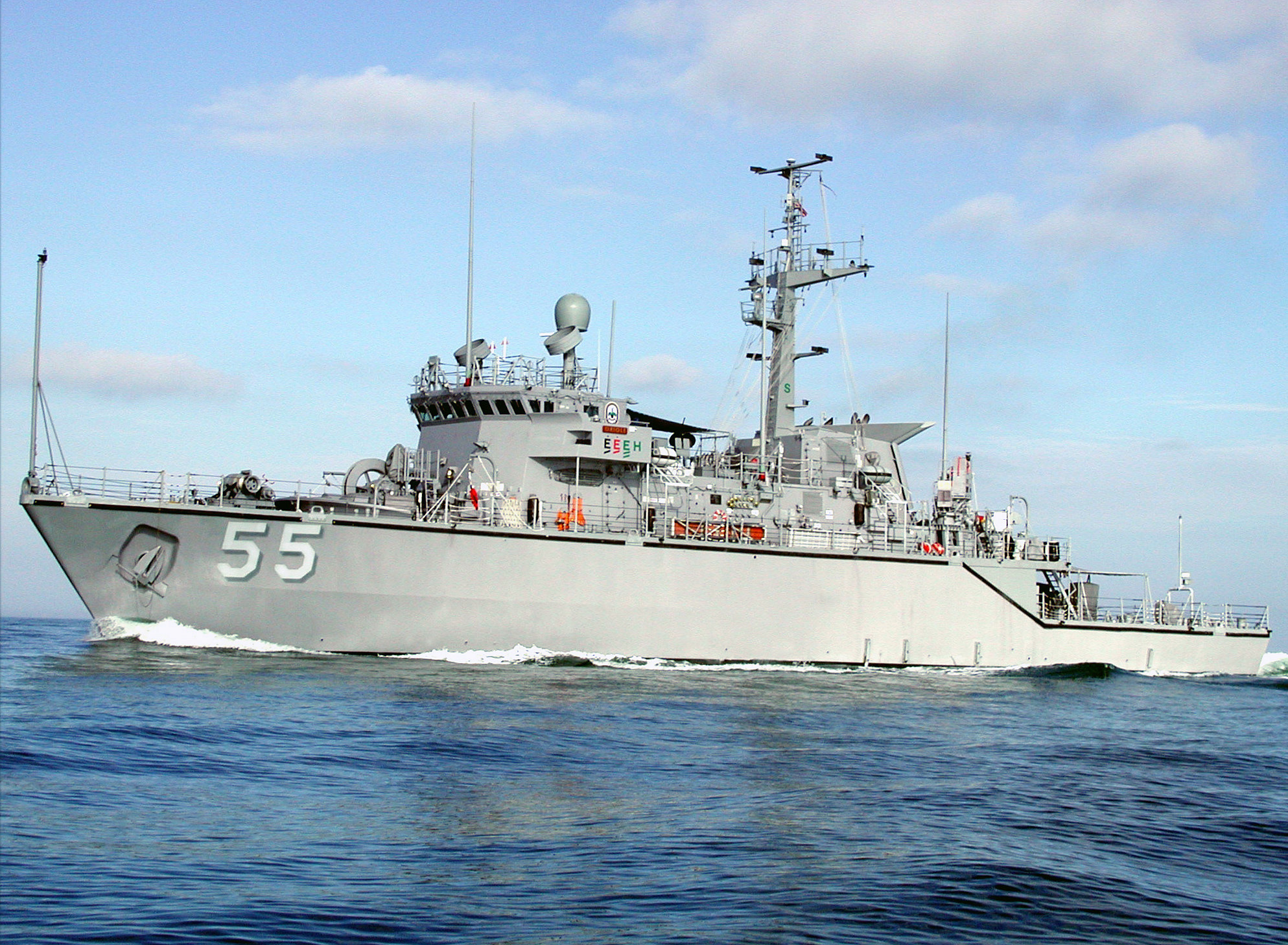
- USS Oriole, 2003

History

United States
- Name: Oriole
- Namesake: Oriole
- Awarded: 1 April 1991
- Builder: Intermarine USA
- Laid down: 3 August 1991
- Launched: 22 May 1993
- Acquired: 12 May 1995
- Commissioned: 16 September 1995
- Decommissioned: 30 June 2006
- Stricken: 30 June 2006
- Fate: Sold to Taiwan
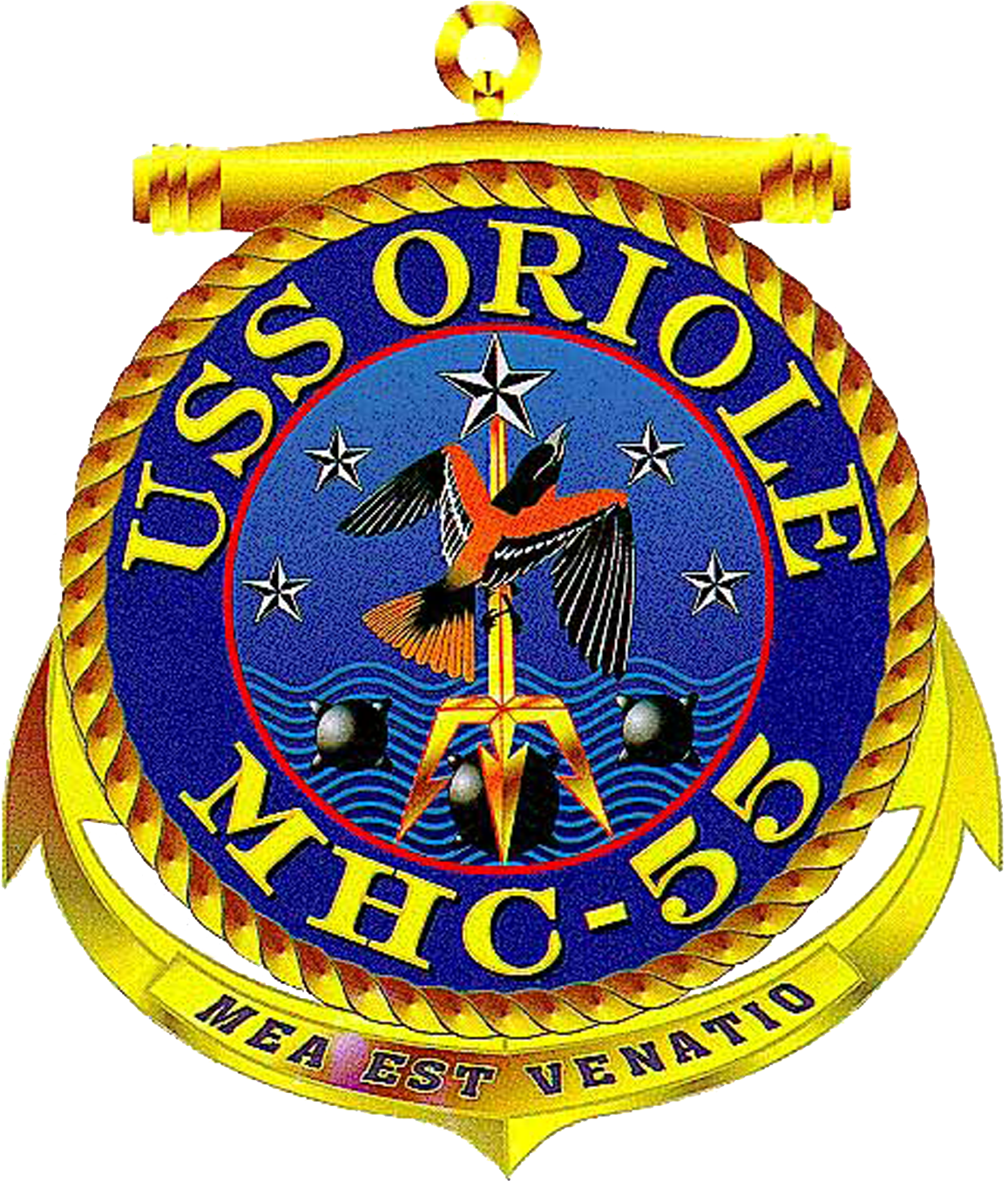
- Badge

History

Taiwan
- Name: ROCS Yung Jin (MHC 1310)
- Acquired: 2 August 2012
- Commissioned: 10 August 2012
- Status: In service

General characteristics
- Class & type: Osprey-class coastal minehunter
- Displacement: 796 tons (light) 882 tons (full)
- Length: 188 ft (57 m)
- Beam: 38 ft (12 m)
- Draft: 11 ft (3.4 m)
- Propulsion: Two diesels (800 hp each)
- Speed: 12 knots (22 km/h; 14 mph)
- Complement: 5 officers and 46 enlisted
- Armament: Mine neutralization system & two .50 cal (12.7 mm) machine guns

USS Oriole (MHC-55) was an Osprey-class coastal minehunter of the United States Navy. She was built by Intermarine USA and launched in 1993 then commissioned in 1995. After only eleven years of service she was decommissioned in 2006 and sold to Taiwan. She now operates as ROCS Yung Jin (MHC-1310).
