= USS Pelican (MHC-53) =

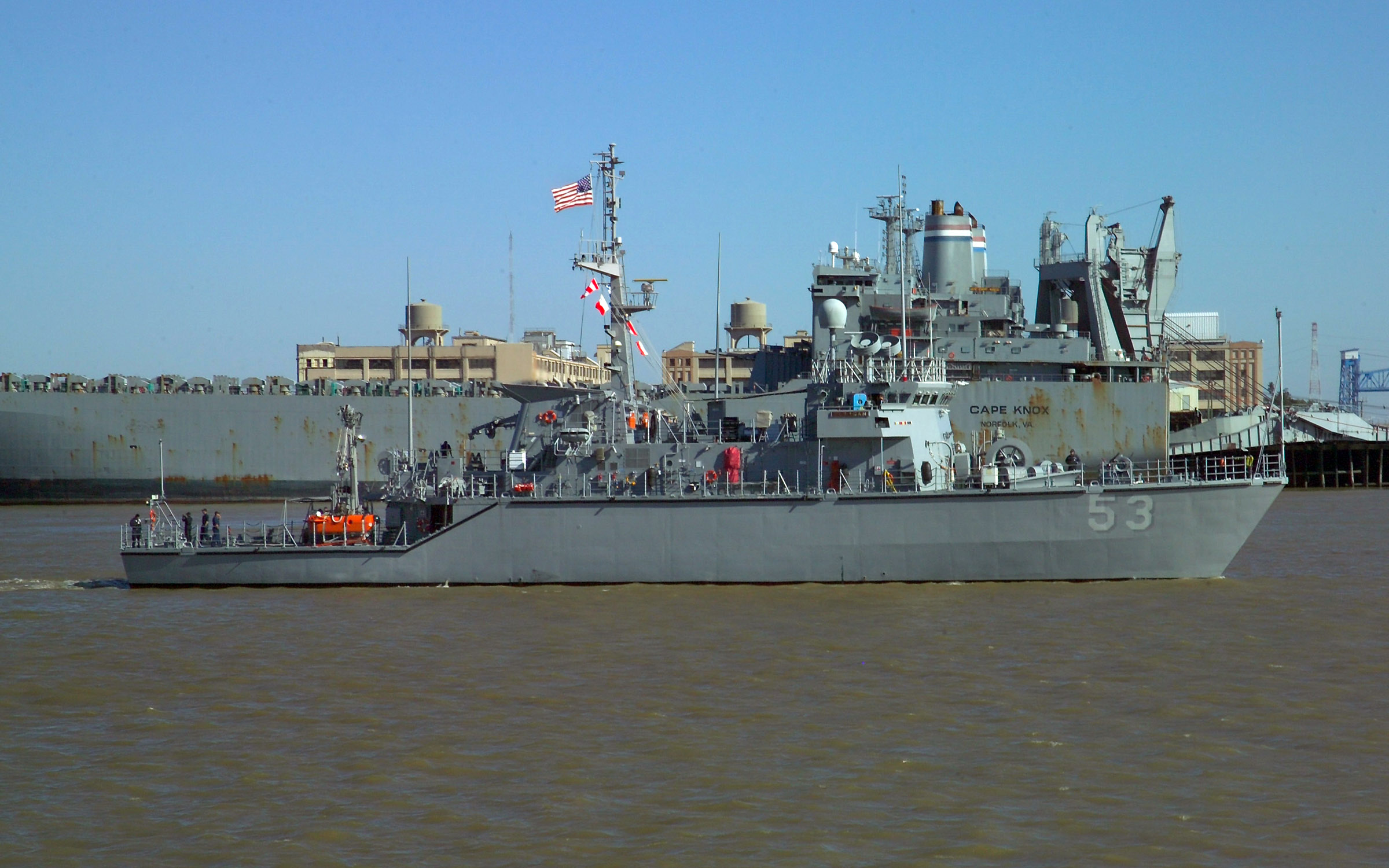
- USS Pelican

History

United States
- Name: USS Pelican
- Namesake: Pelican
- Awarded: 3 October 1989
- Builder: Avondale Shipyard, Gulfport, Mississippi
- Laid down: 6 June 1991
- Launched: 27 February 1993
- Completed: 11 August 1995
- Commissioned: 18 November 1995
- Decommissioned: 16 March 2007
- Stricken: 16 March 2007
- Identification: MHC-53
- Fate: Sold to Greece, 16 March 2007
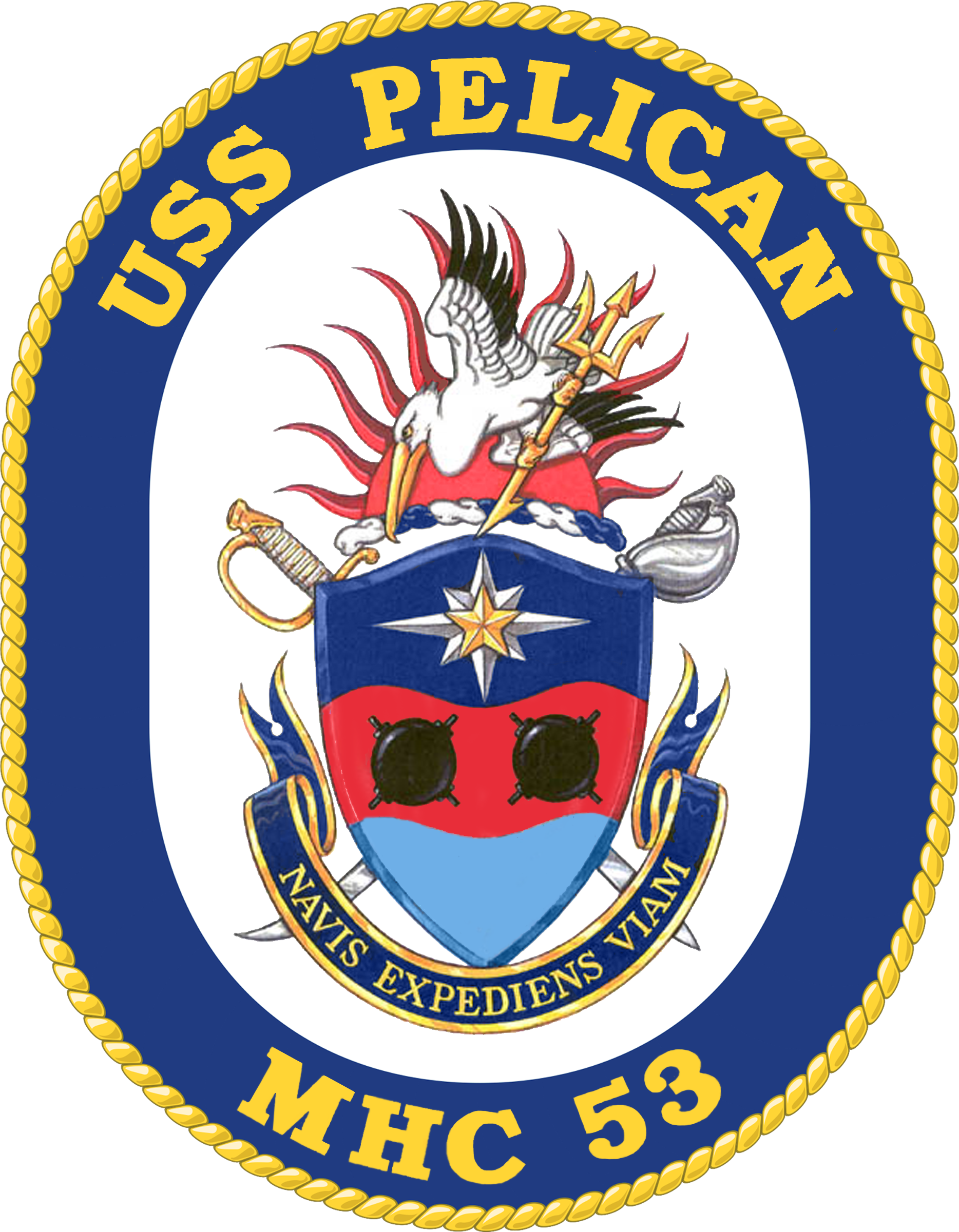
- Badge

Greece
- Name: Evniki
- Acquired: 16 March 2007
- Commissioned: 16 March 2007
- Identification: M61
- Fate: in active service

General characteristics
- Class & type: Osprey-class coastal minehunter
- Displacement: 839 long tons (852 t) light; 926 long tons (941 t) full
- Length: 188 ft (57 m)
- Beam: 38 ft (12 m)
- Draft: 11 ft (3.4 m)
- Propulsion: Two diesels, 800 hp (597 kW) each
- Speed: 12 knots (22 km/h; 14 mph)
- Complement: 5 Officers, 46 Enlisted
- Armament: Mine neutralization system & two .50 cal (12.7 mm) machine guns

USS Pelican (MHC-53) was the third Osprey-class coastal minehunter, and the third ship in the Navy to bear the name of the bird. As of 1 January 1997, Pelican was part of the Naval Reserve Force. In that role, the ship was used as training platform for naval reservists. She was both decommissioned and stricken from the Navy List on 16 March 2007, then Pelican was transferred to the Hellenic Navy on the same day. There, she was recommissioned as Evniki.

== See also ==
- Naval Inactive Ship Maintenance Facility
