= Peter Fanta =

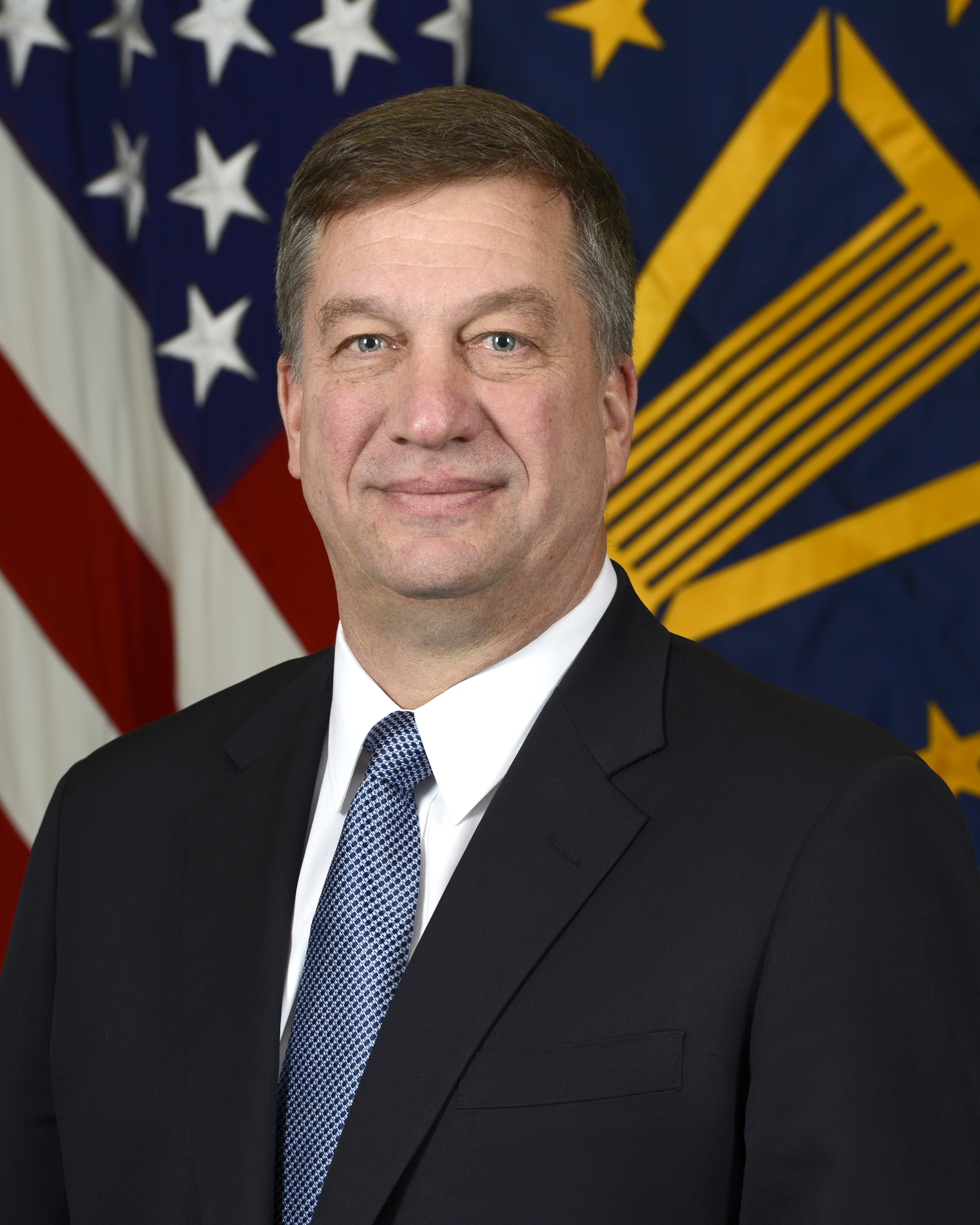

Deputy Assistant Secretary of Defense for Nuclear Matters
- In office February 2018

Personal details
- Born: 1961 (age 64–65) Manitowoc, Wisconsin, U.S.
- Education: Harvard University (MPA); Naval War College (MS); U.S. Naval Academy (BS)

Military service
- Branch/service: United States Navy
- Years of service: 37
- Rank: Rear admiral

Peter Joseph Fanta (born 1961) is a former Deputy Assistant Secretary of Defense for Nuclear Matters who took up the post in February 2018.

He is a retired Rear Admiral of the United States Navy. His final active duty assignment was as director of Warfare Integration. He previously served as Commander, Expeditionary Strike Group Five.

== Biography ==
Fanta is a native of Manitowoc, Wisconsin. He holds an M.P.A. from Harvard University and an M.S. in National Security and Strategic Studies from the Naval War College.

== Career ==
Fanta graduated from the United States Naval Academy in 1983. He has served aboard the USS Rushmore (LSD-47), USS Falcon (MHC-59), USS John Paul Jones (DDG-53), USS Pegasus (PHM-1) and the USS Coontz (DDG-40). Other assignments have included serving as an executive assistant to the Assistant Secretary of the Navy (Financial Management and Comptroller).

He commanded USS Falcon and USS Rushmore, and later Amphibious Squadron Two and the Bataan Expeditionary Strike Group. His shore assignments included the surface warfare division's air defense and combat systems integration branch, senior fellow at the Chief of Naval Operations Strategic Studies Group, and chief of the programming and budget branch on the Joint Staff.

Fanta led the Navy's surface warfare directorate from July 2014, where he was central to the service's "distributed lethality" concept, a plan to spread offensive firepower across more ships. In June 2016 the Navy announced that he would become director of warfare integration, with Rear Admiral Ronald Boxall taking over the surface warfare directorate.

According to a biography published by SUNY Maritime College, his responsibilities as deputy assistant secretary covered the governance of the nuclear weapons enterprise, the development, security and safety of the weapons themselves, nuclear incident response, and international nuclear agreements. The same biography credits him with 37 years of active service and with senior staff tours as director of warfare integration, director of surface warfare and deputy director for resources and acquisition on the Joint Staff, and says he has also worked in shipbuilding as a chief operating officer and director of business development.

In February 2019, at the Nuclear Deterrence Summit, Fanta said the United States should put more emphasis on modernizing nuclear warheads than on delivery systems, and that the Defense and Energy departments should work together toward updated warheads by the 2040s.

=== Awards and honors ===
Awards he has received include the:

- Legion of Merit (4)
- Defense Superior Service Medal (2)
- Meritorious Service Medal (2)
- Navy and Marine Corps Commendation Medal (3)
