= USS Cardinal (MHC-60) =

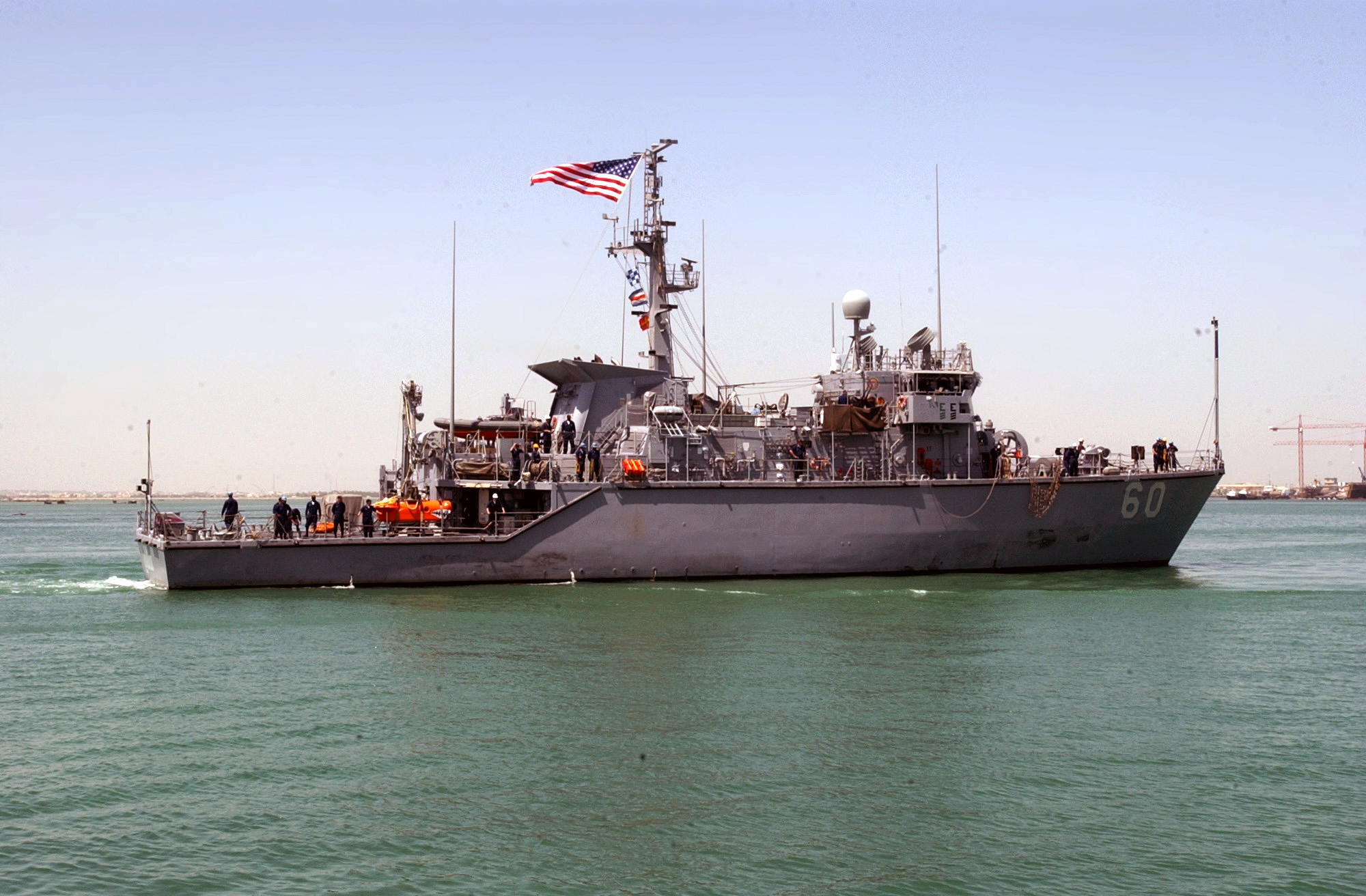
- USS Cardinal in the Persian Gulf, 2003

History

United States
- Name: USS Cardinal
- Awarded: 22 April 1992
- Builder: Intermarine
- Laid down: 13 April 1994
- Launched: 9 March 1996
- Commissioned: 18 October 1997
- Decommissioned: 30 December 2006
- Stricken: 7 January 2007
- Fate: Sold to Egypt
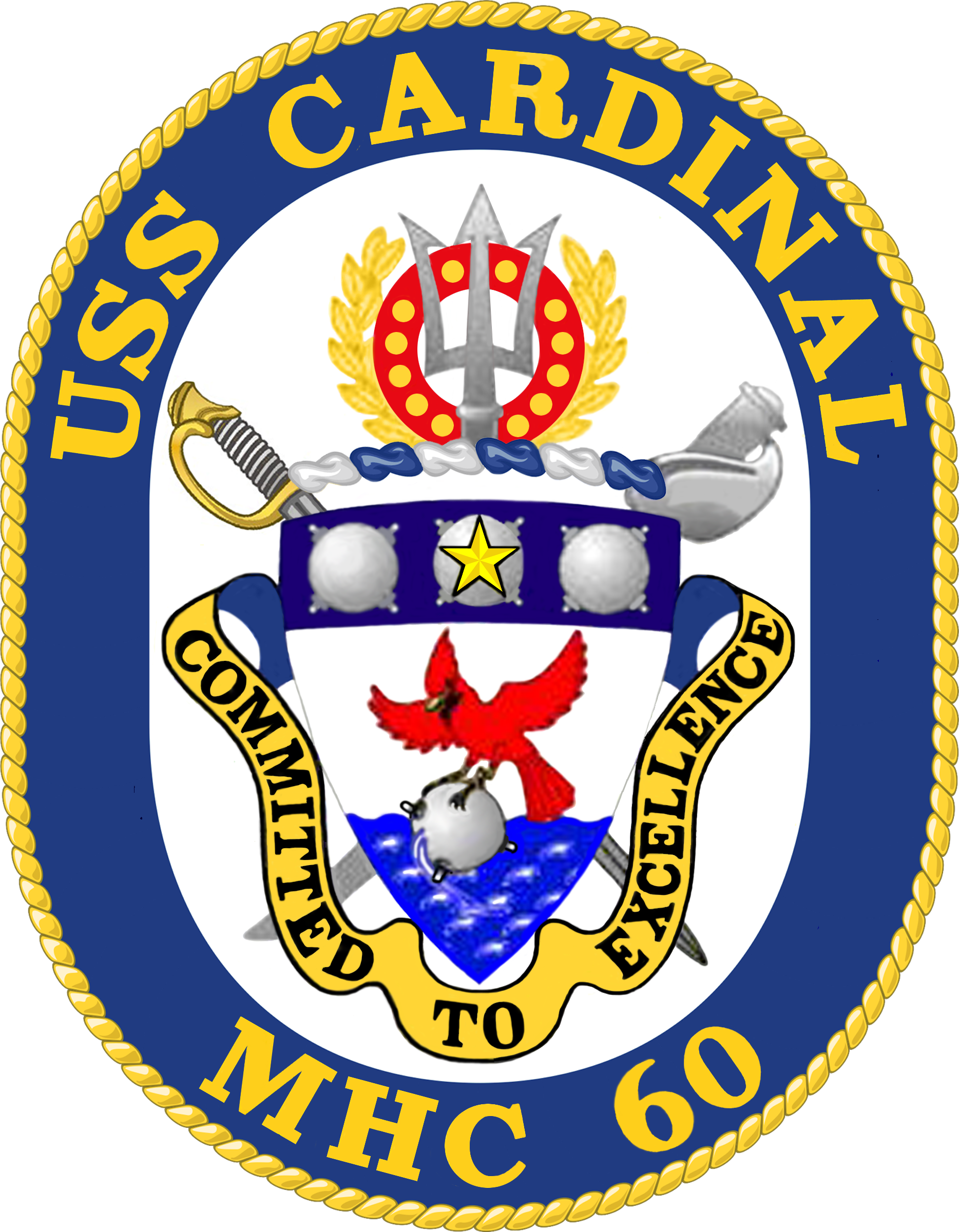
- Badge

General characteristics
- Class & type: Osprey-class coastal minehunter
- Displacement: 828 tons
- Length: 188′ (57.3 m)
- Beam: 38′ (11.6 m)
- Draft: 11′ (3.4 m)
- Complement: 5 officers and 46 enlisted

USS Cardinal (MHC-60) was the tenth Osprey-class coastal mine hunter in the United States Navy. She was commissioned on 18 October 1997, decommissioned on 7 January 2007 and sold to Egypt.

The ship was commissioned in the Potomac River at Alexandria Virginia.The Ship's Sponsor was Mrs. Richard Gephardt, wife of Congressman Dick Gephardt of Missouri.In attendance at the Commissioning Ceremony was the St. Louis Cardinals baseball player Stan "The Man" Musial.

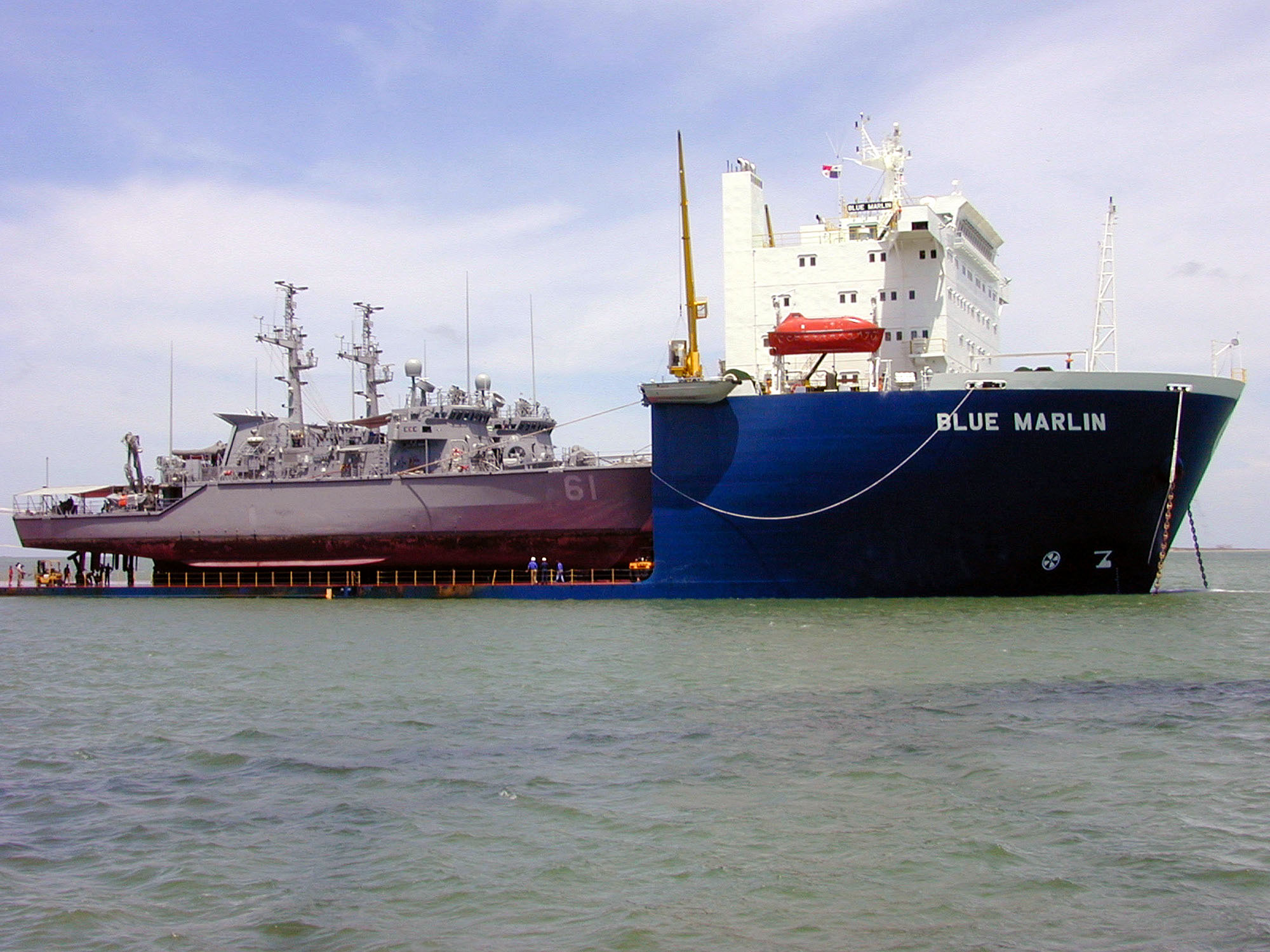
Cardinal and Raven loaded aboard MV Blue Marlin for transport to the Persian Gulf, July 2000
