= USS Raven (MHC-61) =

US Navy coastal minesweeper

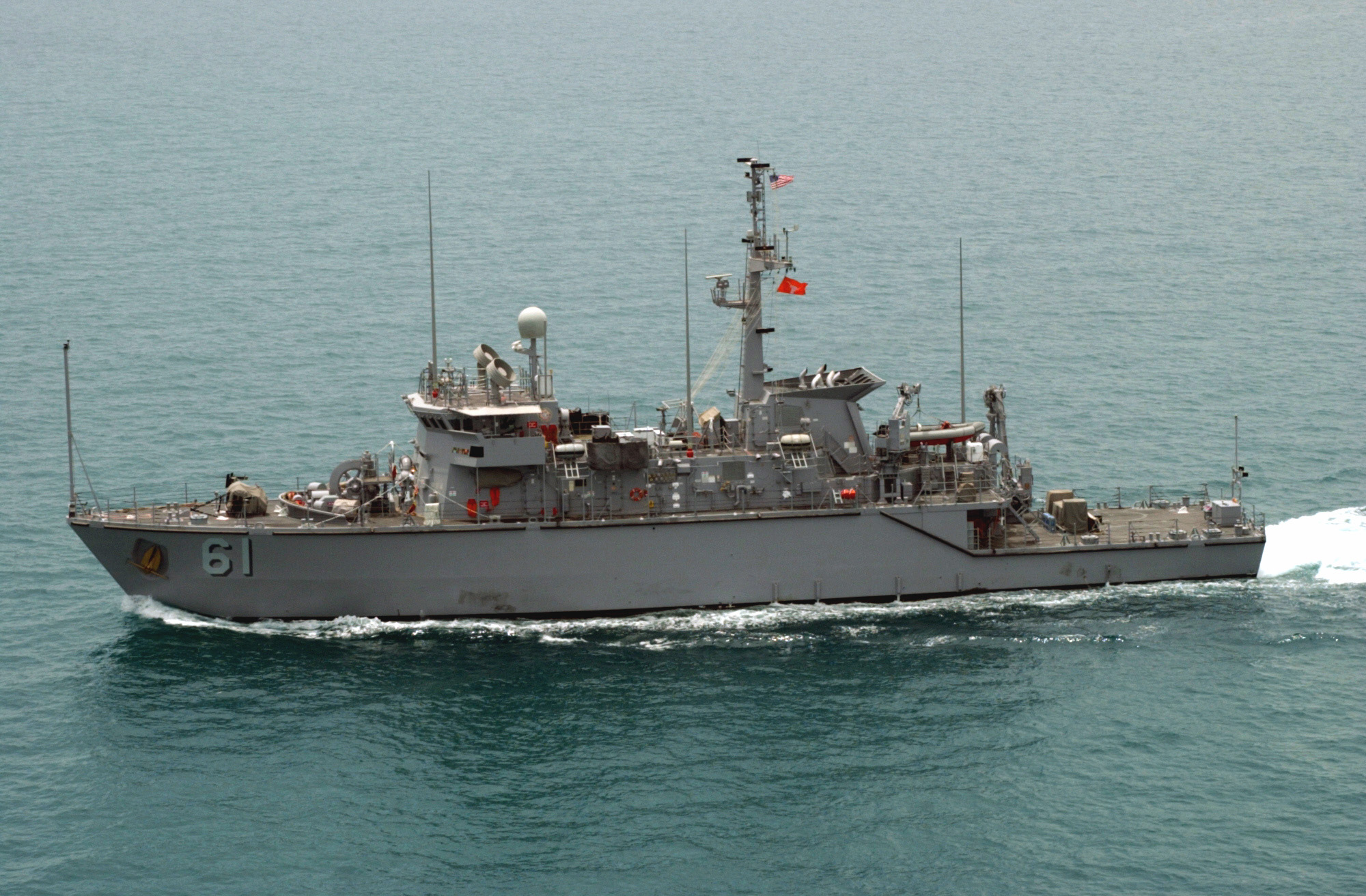
- USS Raven, April 2004

History

United States
- Name: USS Raven
- Operator: United States Navy, Egyptian Navy
- Ordered: 31 March 1993
- Builder: Intermarine USA
- Laid down: 1 April 1995
- Launched: 28 September 1996
- Sponsored by: Mrs. Dorothy McDowell Smith
- Commissioned: 5 September 1998
- Decommissioned: 1 January 2007
- Stricken: 1 January 2007
- Fate: transferred to Egyptian Navy

General characteristics
- Class & type: Osprey class coastal minehunter
- Displacement: 817 tons light, 904 tons full, 87 tons dead
- Length: 57.3 m (188 ft) overall, 53 m (174 ft) waterline
- Beam: 11.5 m (38 ft) extreme, 10.9 m (36 ft) waterline
- Draught: 3.3 m (11 ft) maximum, 3.3 m (11 ft) limit
- Complement: 5 officers, 46 men

USS Raven (MHC-61), an Osprey-class coastal minehunter, was the third ship of the United States Navy to be named for the raven. The contract to build her was awarded to Intermarine USA in Savannah, Georgia on 31 March 1993 and her keel was laid down on 1 April 1995. She was launched on 28 September 1996, and commissioned on 5 September 1998.

She was decommissioned in January 2007 (on a schedule which has all Osprey-class ships fully decommissioned by the end of 2008) and given to the Egyptian Navy pursuant to the Naval Vessels Transfer Act of 2005 (P.L. 109-134).

She was the 11th ship of the 12 Osprey-class coastal mine hunters, which are named for birds of prey. Osprey class are the world's largest mine hunters to be constructed entirely of fiberglass and designed to survive the shock of underwater explosions. Raven's primary mission was reconnaissance, classification, and neutralization of all types of moored and bottom mines in littoral areas, harbors and coastal waterways. She is equipped with a high definition, variable-depth sonar, and a remotely operated, robotic submarine (referred to as a Mine Neutralization Vehicle) used to neutralize mines. As of September 2000, Raven had been forward deployed to Manama, Bahrain. The ship was previously homeported in Ingleside, TX.
