= USS Shrike (MHC-62) =

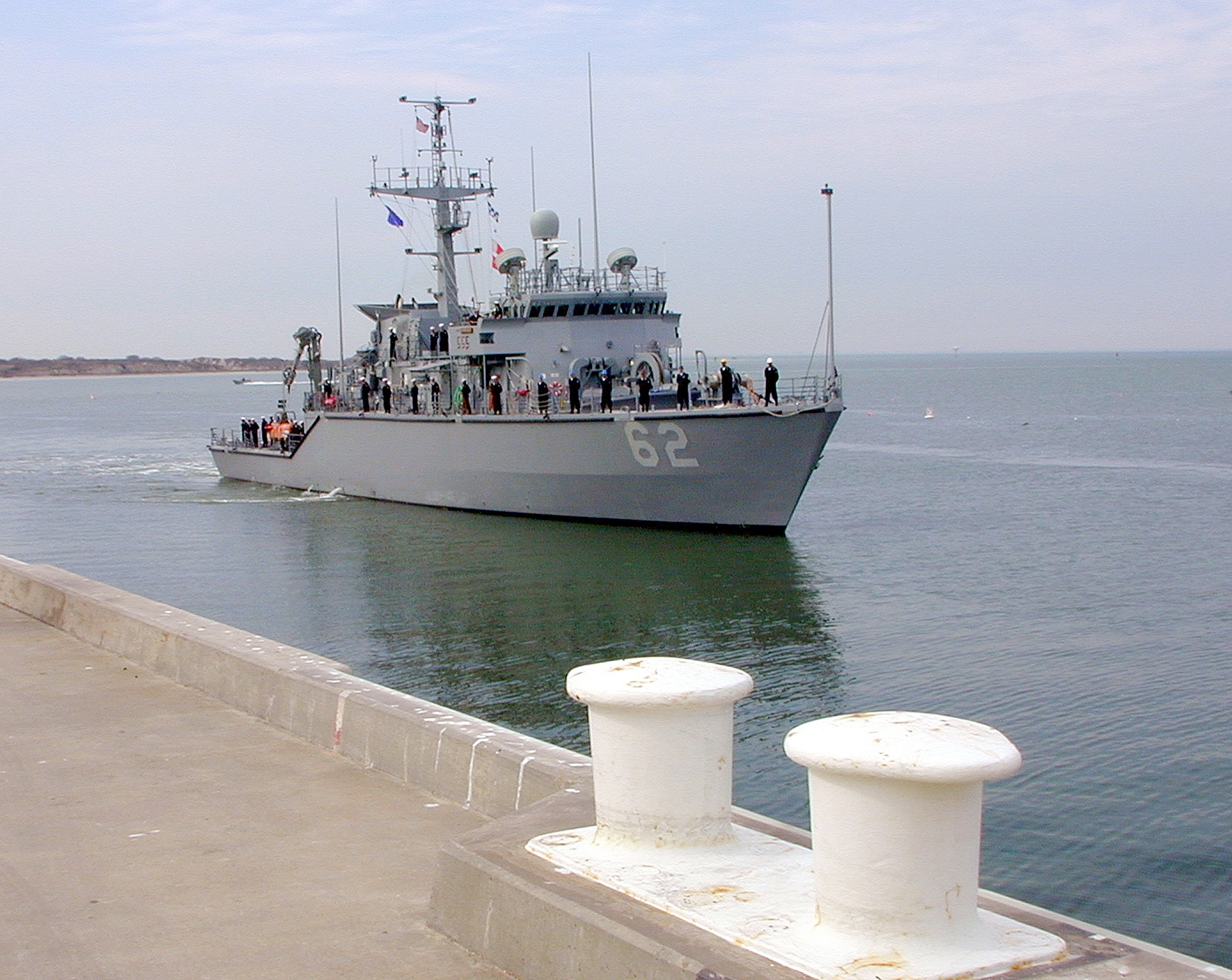
- USS Shrike arriving at NS Ingleside, Texas, 2002

History

United States
- Name: USS Shrike
- Namesake: Shrike
- Ordered: 31 March 1993
- Builder: Intermarine USA
- Laid down: 12 September 1995
- Launched: 24 May 1997
- Acquired: 11 January 1999
- Commissioned: 31 May 1999
- Decommissioned: 01 December 2007
- Stricken: 01 December 2007
- Fate: Sold by U.S. General Services Administration for scrap, 8 May 2014

General characteristics
- Class & type: Osprey class coastal mine hunter
- Displacement: 918 Tons
- Length: 188′ (57.3 m)
- Beam: 38′ (11.6 m)
- Draft: 11′ (3.4 m)
- Propulsion: 2 × Isotta Fraschini ID36 SS8V-AM diesel engines
- Speed: 10 knots (19 km/h; 12 mph)
- Complement: 6 Officers, 46 Enlisted
- Armament: 2 × 50 caliber machine guns

USS Shrike (MHC-62) is the twelfth and last ship of Osprey-class coastal mine hunters.
