= USS Osprey (MHC-51) =

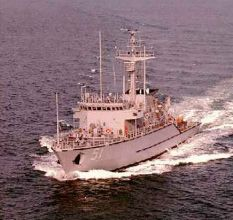
- USS Osprey (MHC-51)

History

United States
- Name: USS Osprey
- Namesake: osprey
- Awarded: 22 May 1987
- Builder: Intermarine USA
- Laid down: 16 June 1988
- Launched: 23 March 1991
- Acquired: 23 August 1993
- Commissioned: 20 November 1993
- Decommissioned: 15 June 2006
- Stricken: 15 June 2006
- Fate: Sold by U.S. General Services Administration for scrap, 08 May 2014
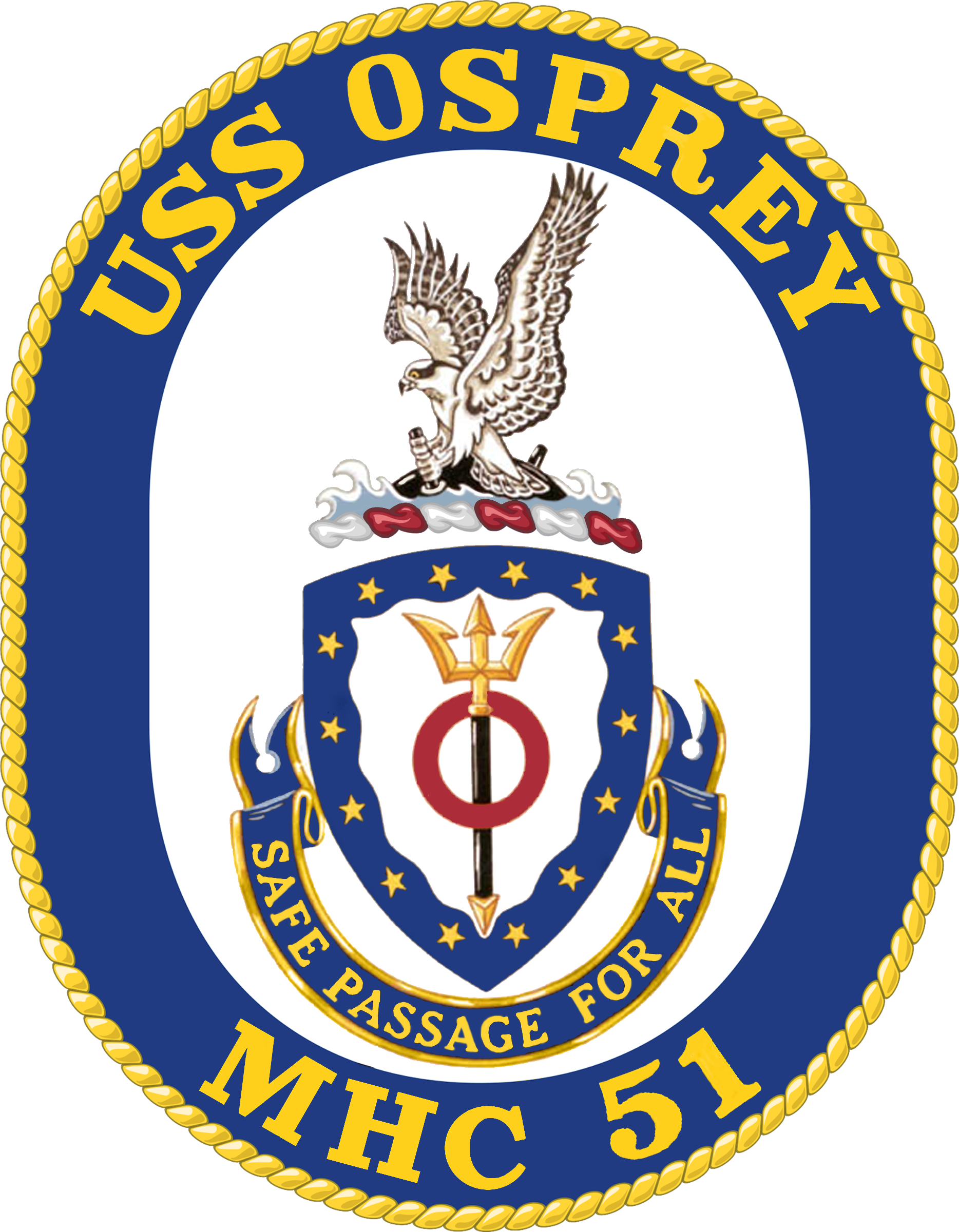
- Badge

General characteristics
- Class & type: Osprey-class coastal minehunter
- Displacement: 817 tons (light) 904 tons (full)
- Length: 188 ft (57 m)
- Beam: 38 ft (12 m)
- Draft: 11 ft (3.4 m)
- Complement: 51

USS Osprey (MHC-51) is the lead ship of Osprey-class coastal mine hunters, and the fourth U.S. Navy ship of that name.
