= AN/SQQ-32 mine-hunting sonar =

The AN/SQQ-32 minehunting sonar set (MSS) is a variable-depth mine-hunting sonar system originally developed by Raytheon and Thales Underwater Systems (formerly Thomson Marconi Sonar) for the United States Navy. It includes two separate active sonar systems to detect and classify mine-like objects on the surface, in the volume, or on the bottom of the sea. The sonar systems are packaged in a single towed body tethered to the ship through a cable providing power and data transmission, with the cable length variable via an electric winch. A hole in the ship extending from the sonar maintenance room (SMR) to the hull allows movement of the towed body in different configurations for maintenance, stowage at sea, and minehunting operations. The towed body can be configured for minehunting by either locking to the bottom of the ship's hull for shallow water operations, or by extending and retracting the tow cable to allow for variable depth sonar (VDS) operations. VDS operations are necessary in deep water due to refraction of the sonar from the various temperature layers present in the ocean; with the sonar positioned in the same thermal layer as the suspected mines the error induced by refraction is minimized. The detect and classify sonar subsystems are independently monitored and controlled by two operators at independent panels working together to find and characterize underwater objects as mine or non-mine like objects.

The SQQ-32 system became operational in 1990 and is currently installed on all mine countermeasures ships in the Avenger class and was previously installed on the Osprey class before decommissioned.

In accordance with the Joint Electronics Type Designation System (JETDS), the "AN/SQQ-32" designation represents the 32nd design of an Army-Navy electronic device for surface ship special combination sonar system. The JETDS system also now is used to name all Department of Defense electronic systems.

== Detect system ==
The detect system is a low frequency, low resolution, high range sonar designed to provide a general location of possible mine-like objects. It provides much greater range than the classify sonar system but provides little resolution and detail of the objects it detects. It provides the operator 180 degrees of selectable coverage via electronic switching of sonar stave arrays circling the towed body. The newest AN/SQQ-32(V)4 upgrade contracted in 2011 includes a high frequency wide band (HFWB) modification that greatly improves shallow-water minehunting capabilities in high clutter environments.

== Classify system ==
The classify sonar has a lower range, but higher frequency and higher resolution to allow the classification of a target as mine-like or non mine-like. Once a target is located by the detect operator, they will hand off the position to the classify operator where they will analyze the characteristics of the object to make a determination if it has mine-like properties. Characteristics include approximate size and shape measurements, ringing patterns caused by metallic objects, and aspect changes as the ship and towed body circle the target.

== (V)4 upgrade ==
The AN/SQQ-32(V)4 system upgrade was designed and tested by Naval Surface Warfare Center Panama City and The University of Texas Applied Research Laboratory, and contracted to BAE systems for installation. The initial contract was for installation on four MCM-1 Avenger class minesweepers for $14 million, and later an available option was awarded to upgrade an additional ten units plus a battle spare.

== See also ==
- List of military electronics of the United States
- Joint Electronics Type Designation System
