= Osprey-class minehunter =

Ship class

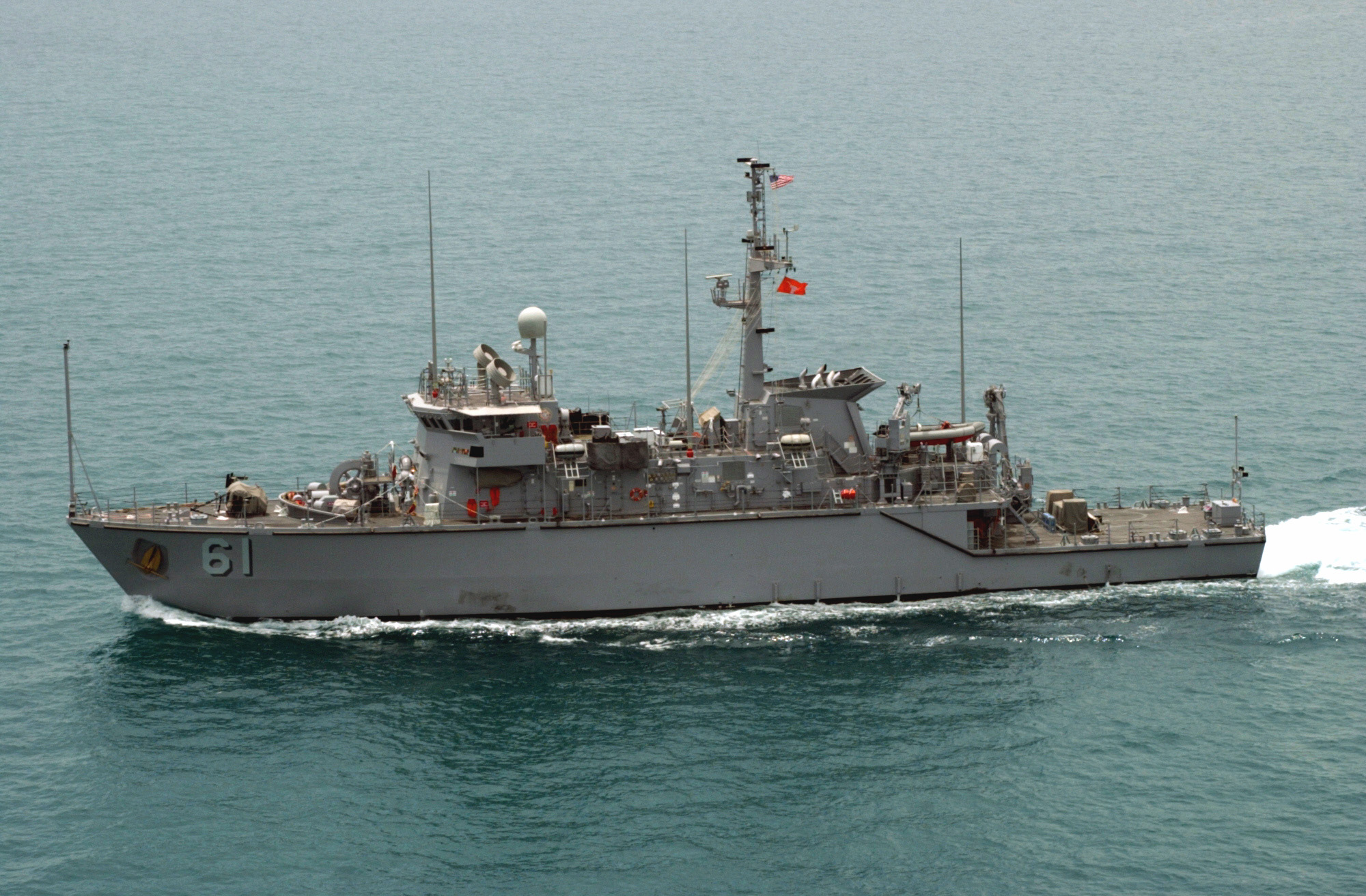
- USS Raven in the Persian Gulf, 2004

Class overview
- Name: Osprey class
- Builders: Intermarine USA; Avondale Shipyard
- Operators: United States Navy (former); Hellenic Navy; Egyptian Navy; Republic of China Navy
- Preceded by: Harkness class
- Succeeded by: None
- Built: 1991–1995
- In service: 1993–present
- In commission: 1993–2007 (US Navy)
- Completed: 12
- Active: 2 with Hellenic Navy; 2 with Egyptian Navy; 2 with ROC (Taiwan) Navy
- Scrapped: 6

General characteristics
- Type: Coastal minehunter
- Displacement: 881 long tons (895 t) (full load)
- Length: 188 ft (57 m)
- Beam: 36 ft (11 m)
- Draft: 7 ft (2.1 m)
- Installed power: 2 × Isotta Fraschini ID36 SS8V-AM diesel engines; 1,600 hp (1,200 kW)
- Propulsion: 2 × Voith-Schneider vertical axis (cycloidal) propulsion systems; 2 × Variable-pitch propeller
- Speed: 12 knots (22 km/h)
- Range: 1,500 nautical miles (2,800 km)
- Endurance: 15 days
- Complement: 5 officers, 4 non-commissioned officers, 42 enlisted
- Sensors & processing systems: AN/SYQ-13 navigation/command and control; AN/SPS-64(V)9 surface search radar; AN/SPA-25G shipboard radar repeater (transistorized); AN/WSN-2 stabilized gyrocompass; AN/SSQ-94 on board trainer
- Electronic warfare & decoys: AN/SLQ-48 mine neutralization equipment; AN/SQQ-32 minehunting sonar
- Armament: 2 × .50 caliber machine guns; 1 × Stinger missile launcher

The Osprey class are a series of coastal minehunters designed to find, classify, and destroy moored and bottom naval mines from vital waterways.

Their design is based on the second series of the Italian Lerici-class, built in La Spezia by Intermarine between 1990 and 1996. Eight vessels were built in the Intermarine shipyard located in Savannah, while the remaining four have been built by a second-source shipyard under a Technology Transfer and Licence Agreement.

They use sonar and video systems, cable cutters and a mine detonating device that can be released and detonated by remote control. The Osprey class are the world's second largest minehunters (surpassed by the Royal Navy's 60-meter (200 ft) Hunt-class mine countermeasures vessels) to be constructed entirely of fiberglass and designed to survive the shock of underwater explosions. Their primary mission is reconnaissance, classification, and neutralization of all types of moored and bottom mines in littoral areas, harbors and coastal waterways.

== Construction ==
Twelve minehunter ships were built for the U.S. Navy by Northrop Grumman Ship Systems (formerly Litton Avondale Industries) of New Orleans and Intermarine of Savannah. The ships were commissioned between 1993 and 1999. The ships of this class were named after various types of birds.

The 12 ships are 187 feet 10 inches (57.3 m) long, 34 feet 7 inches (10.5 m) wide, and 70 feet 0 inches (21.3 m) tall. When carrying a full load they displace 904 tonnes (890 long tons; 996 short tons). They have four decks, and have a complement of five officers, four chief petty officers, and 42 enlisted men. They are armed with two .50 caliber machine guns. All of the major equipment is suspended from the main deck in glass-reinforced plastic holders, so that in the event of an undersea explosion, it will not be damaged.

They use an AN/SLQ-53 deep sweep mine countermeasures system. They also use an AN/SQQ-32 Variable Depth Sonar, which is tethered to the front of the bridge, to detect and identify mines using multiple ping processing. Two AN/UYK-44 computers are also used to classify and detect mines. For surface radar purposes, an AN/SPS-64(V)9 is used. They also use the AN/SLQ-48 mine neutralization system, which is tethered to the ship by a 1.07-kilometre (0.66 mi) long cable. They have two AN/UYQ-31 operator data terminals, which are identical.

They are propelled by two Isotta Fraschini ID 36 SS 8V AM diesel engines which drive generators feeding two Voith Schneider cycloidal propellers generating 1,600 horsepower (1,200 kW). They have a max speed of 12 knots (22 km/h), and a maximum operational range of 1,500 nautical miles (2,800 km).

== Decommissioning ==
All of these ships were decommissioned in 2006–07. The Hellenic Navy received two of the Osprey class from the US Navy: Heron, renamed Calypso and Pelican, renamed Euniki. Two more were transferred to the Egyptian Navy: Cardinal, renamed al Sedeeq (MHC-521) and Raven, renamed al Farouk (MHC-524). The sale of Oriole and Falcon to the Republic of China was also authorized.

The U.S. General Services Administration (GSA) announced in April 2014 that hull numbers MHC-51, 54, 56, 57, 58, and 62 were up for auction to be sold as an entire lot for "dismantlement purposes only." This contradicted earlier information announcing the sale of some of these vessels to foreign operators. The minehunting role of this class is to be taken over by Littoral Combat Ships equipped with the Mine Counter-Measures Module.

== Ships ==
List of Osprey-class ships
Ship	Hull No.	Builder	Commissioned– Decommissioned	NVR Page	Fate
Osprey	MHC-51	Intermarine USA	1993–2006	MHC-51	Sold for scrap 2014.
Heron	MHC-52	Intermarine USA	1994–2007	MHC-52	Sold to the Hellenic Navy, renamed as HS Kalypso (M 64)
Pelican	MHC-53	Avondale Shipyard, Westwego	1995–2007	MHC-53	Sold to the Hellenic Navy, renamed as HS Evniki (M 61)
Robin	MHC-54	Avondale Shipyard	1996–2006	MHC-54	Sold for scrap 2014.
Oriole	MHC-55	Intermarine USA	1995–2006	MHC-55	Sold to the Republic of China (Taiwan) Navy
Kingfisher	MHC-56	Avondale Shipyard, Gulfport	1996–2007	MHC-56	Sold for scrap 2014.
Cormorant	MHC-57	Avondale Shipyard, Gulfport	1997–2007	MHC-57	Sold for scrap 2014.
Black Hawk	MHC-58	Intermarine USA	1996–2007	MHC-58	Sold for scrap 2014.
Falcon	MHC-59	Intermarine USA	1997–2006	MHC-59	Sold to the Republic of China (Taiwan) Navy
Cardinal	MHC-60	Intermarine USA	1997–2007	MHC-60	Sold to the Egyptian Navy, renamed as al Sedeeq (MHC-521)
Raven	MHC-61	Intermarine USA	1998–2007	MHC-61	Sold to the Egyptian Navy, renamed as al Farouk (MHC-524)
Shrike	MHC-62	Intermarine USA	1999–2007	MHC-62	Sold for scrap 2014.

== See also ==
- Lerici-class minehunter – The Italian ship design on which the Osprey class was based
- Avenger-class mine countermeasures ship – US ocean-going class
- Tripartite-class minehunter – Franco-Benelux contemporary
