= Naval Station Ingleside =

Former US Navy base near Corpus Christi, Texas

Coordinates: 27°49′53.3″N 97°12′9.84″W

- Ingleside, Texas
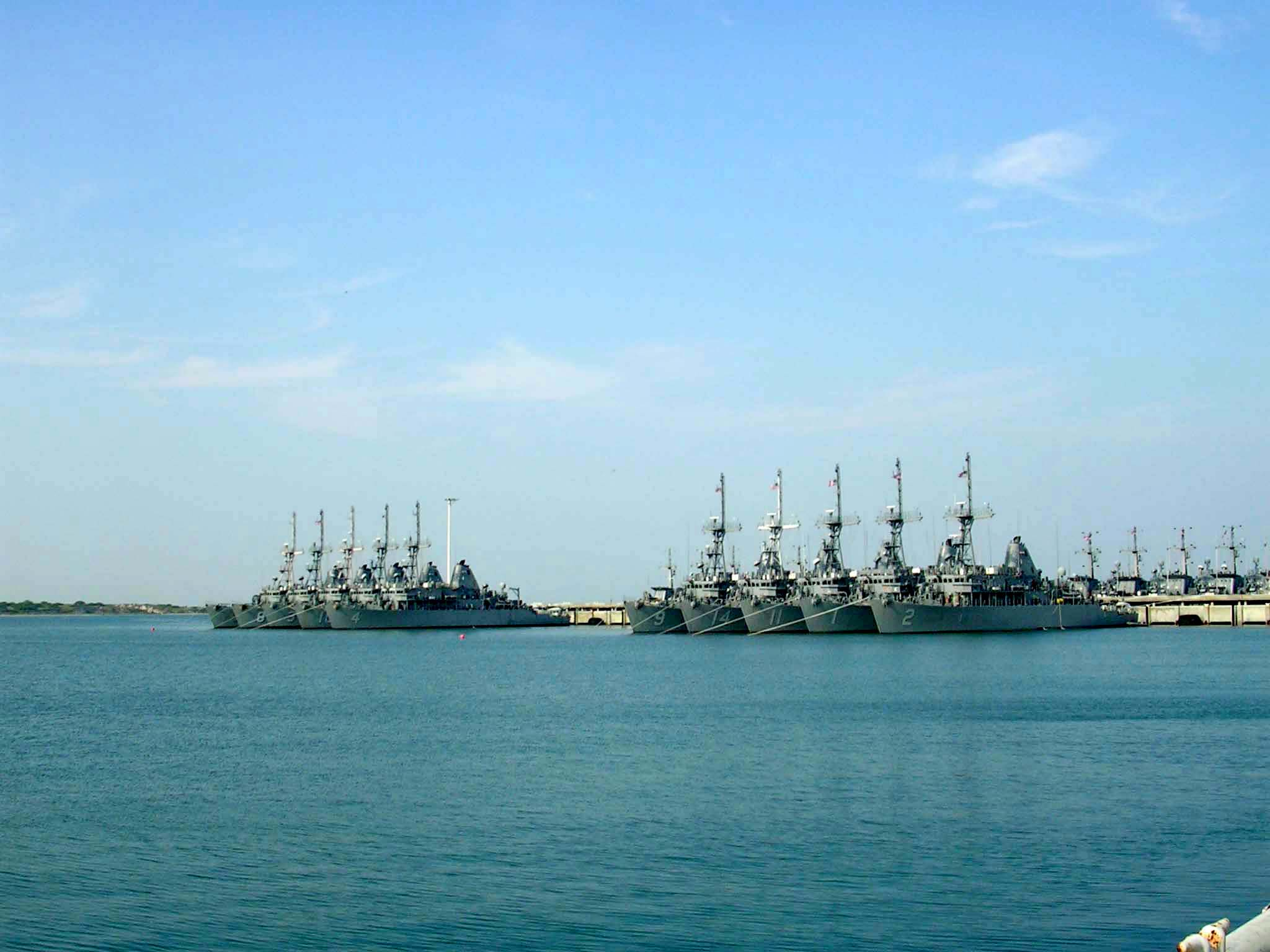

Site information
- Type: Military base
- Controlled by: United States Navy

Site history
- Built: February 20, 1988-September 1990
- In use: July 6, 1992–April 30, 2010

Garrison information
- Past commanders: Captain Leland "BT" D. Taylor

Naval Station Ingleside was a United States Navy base in Ingleside, Texas.

It was on the northern shore of Corpus Christi Bay, 12 miles northeast of the city of Corpus Christi, about 130 miles south of San Antonio and approximately 170 miles southwest of Houston. This region is known as the Coastal Bend. The Naval Station was situated aside the Corpus Christi ship channel, which links the Port of Corpus Christi with the Gulf of Mexico.

NS Ingleside was one of three South Texas installations that comprise Naval Region South.

== History ==
Naval Station Ingleside was first authorized in the National Defense Authorization Act for Fiscal Year 1987 sponsored by Sen. Barry Goldwater. Groundbreaking took place on February 20, 1988 and on April 9, 1990, the Station and the community dedicated the main thoroughfare providing access from the community to the Station, Hayden W. Head Boulevard. In September 1990, enough construction had been completed that personnel moved from temporary office and working spaces in the community onto the station and the waterfront was dedicated. The station was completed when the Station accepted its Headquarters Building on December 14, 1990. The USS Scout became the first ship based at Ingleside on June 25, 1992, and the station was placed in an "operation" status on July 6, 1992, during the same ceremony that marked the Station's first change of command.

Naval Station Ingleside was originally constructed to accommodate a battle group, with a massive 1,100 ft pier, additional berthing space provided along two quay walls, and a heavy-weather mooring system designed to withstand category 2 hurricanes. That Battle Group was initially meant to comprise the training aircraft carrier USS Lexington, the battleship USS Wisconsin, and their surface action group, however changes in the Navy's force structure caused these ships to be decommissioned. In 1991, Secretary of the Navy Henry L. Garrett III decided to make Ingleside the homeport of the Navy's Mine Warfare Force, comprised Avenger-class mine countermeasures ships, Osprey-class coastal minehunters, and the command and control ship USS Inchon.

== Closure ==
On August 24, 2005, the 2005 Base Realignment and Closure Commission (BRAC Commission) voted to close Naval Station Ingleside.

On September 9, 2009, USS Sentry was the last of the Minesweepers from NS Ingleside to arrive in their new homeport of Naval Base San Diego leaving no ships homeported at the base.

On March 3, 2010, the last sailor deployed overseas from NS Ingleside returned from Kuwait.

The base officially shut down on April 30, 2010. The Navy returned ownership of the main base property to the Port of Corpus Christi. The Port of Corpus Christi sold the pier to Flint Hills Resources for $8.5 million and the remainder of the station to a subsidiary of Occidental Petroleum in two packages for $82.1 million and $7 million.
