= Minehunter =

Vessel for detecting and destroying naval mines

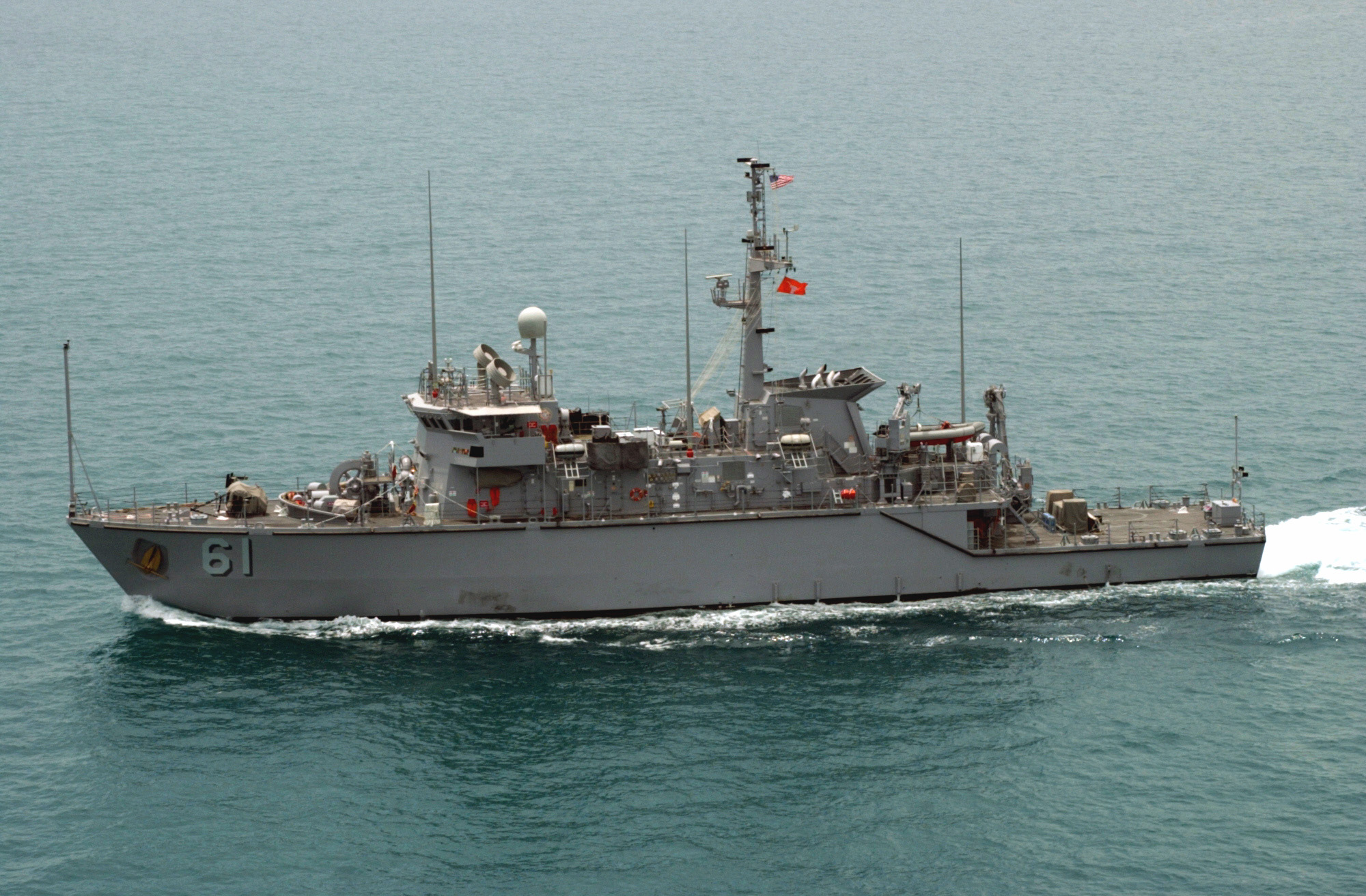
A US Navy coastal minehunter

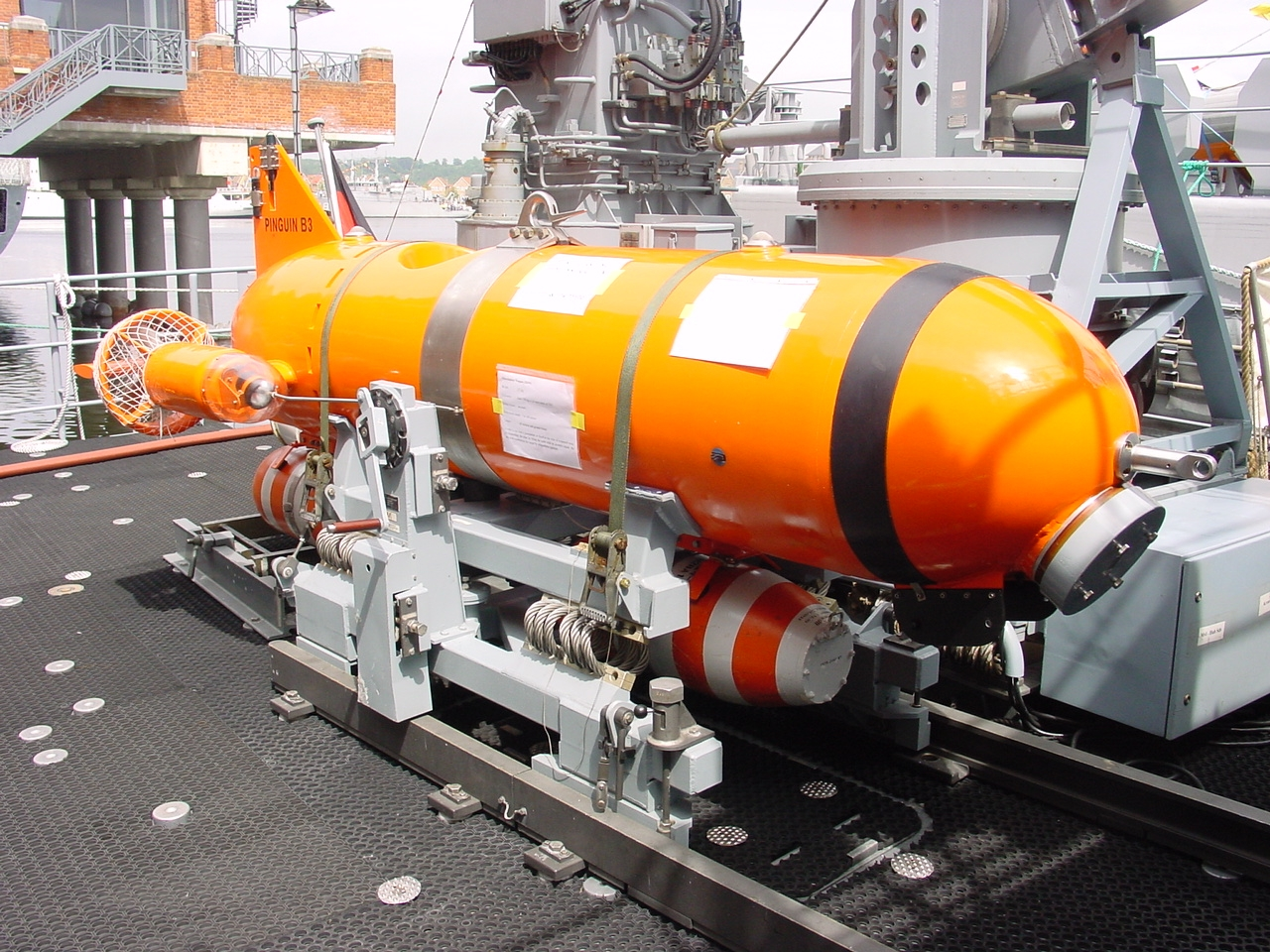
A minehunting ROV of the German Navy with explosive charges underneath the main body

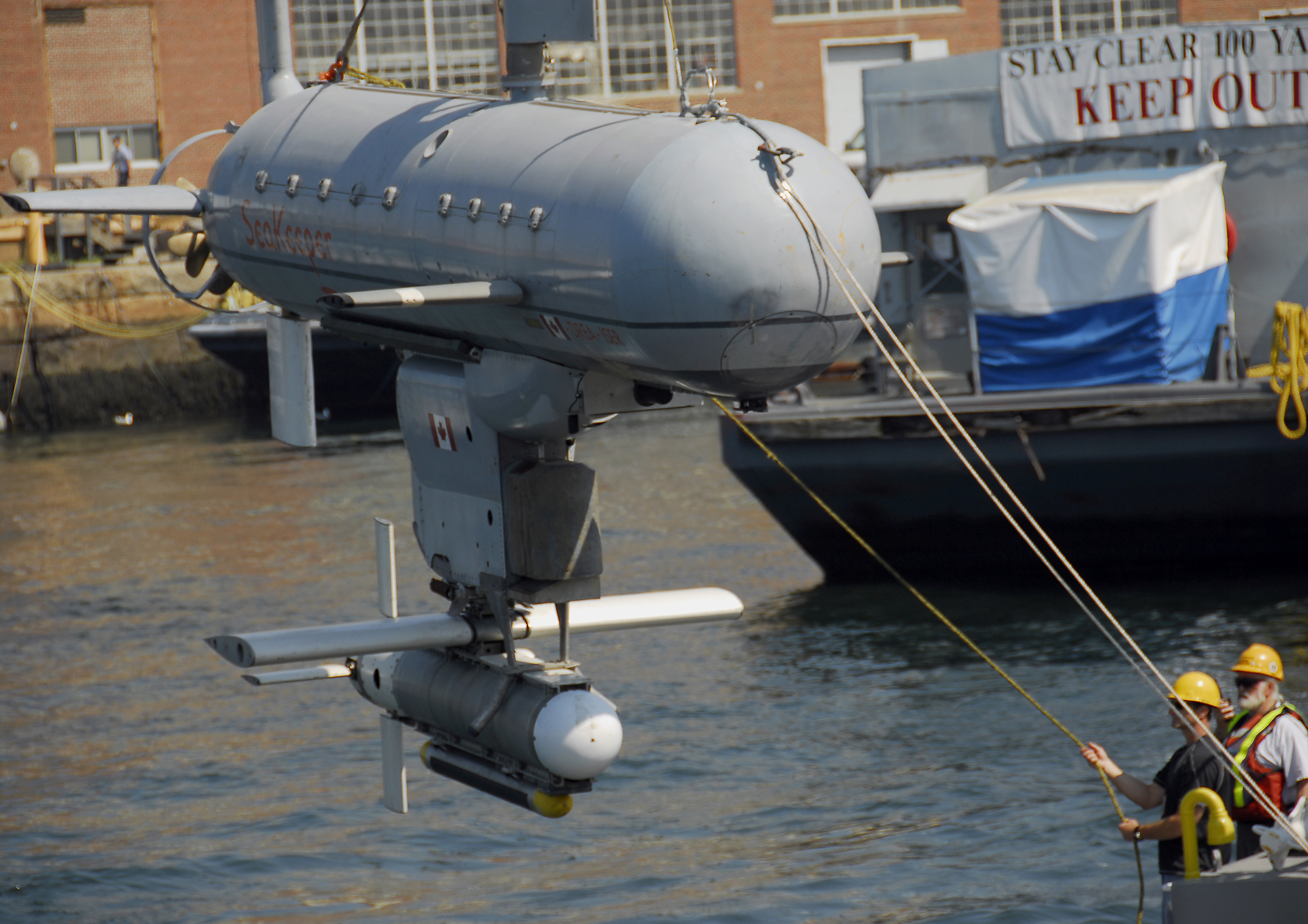
Canadian Navy minehunting ROV

A minehunter is a naval vessel that seeks, detects, and destroys individual naval mines. Minesweepers, on the other hand, clear mined areas as a whole, without prior detection of mines. A vessel that combines both of these roles is known as a mine countermeasures vessel (MCMV).

== Description ==
A minehunter uses an imaging sonar to detect and classify targets and then sends out divers or remotely operated vehicles (ROVs) to inspect and neutralise the threat, often using small charges that are detonated remotely.

As minehunters will often be operating in close proximity to mines, they are designed so as to reduce their own acoustic and magnetic signatures, two common forms of trigger for mines. For example, they are often soundproofed by mounting machinery on shock absorbers or by using quiet electrical drive, low magnetic electric motors and usually have a wood, fiberglass or non-ferrous metal hull, or are degaussed to reduce magnetic signature.

Minehunters are generally small, shallow-draught vessels, as they are often called upon to work in enclosed bodies of water such as shipping channels or harbours. As manoeuvrability in such areas is critical the Voith-Schneider cycloidal propulsor is commonly used, allowing the engine thrust to be transmitted in any direction. A number of modern vessels use catamaran hulls to provide a large, stable working platform with minimal underwater contact; this reduces draught whilst lowering acoustic transmission and reducing the fluid pressure generated by the moving hull that may otherwise detonate mines with a hydraulic pressure trigger.

== Coastal minehunter ==
Coastal minehunters are ships that are designed to find, classify, and destroy moored and bottom mines from vital waterways. Coastal minehunters are generally smaller and with lower sea-keeping and endurance than oceangoing minehunters. They are usually tasked with keeping fixed high-value choke points clear of mines, such as the approaches to military ports and harbours. In a Cold War context it was especially important to protect those ports used by a nation's ballistic missile submarines.

=== Operation ===
Minehunters differ from minesweepers in that minesweepers are used against older magnetic mines that are moored just below the surface. Minehunters are designed to seek out mines and destroy them individually, particularly against more advanced modern mines, which sit on the seabed and can be programmed to target specific vessel types (see CAPTOR mine). To do this they have mine-hunting sonar and can act as motherships and support craft for ROVs and combat divers. However, in some circumstances many minehunters can also destroy less advanced magnetic moored mines in the traditional manner.

=== Coastal minehunter classes ===
- The US Navy Osprey-class coastal minehunter
- The Royal Navy Sandown-class minehunter
- The Finnish Navy Katanpää-class coastal minehunter
- The Italian Navy Lerici-class coastal minehunter

== See also ==
- Minesweeper
- List of mine warfare vessels of the United States Navy
- Bedok-class mine countermeasures vessel
- Tripartite-class minehunter
- Kormoran 2-class minehunter
- AN/WLD-1 RMS Remote Minehunting System
