= Remotely operated underwater vehicle =

Tethered underwater mobile device operated by a remote crew

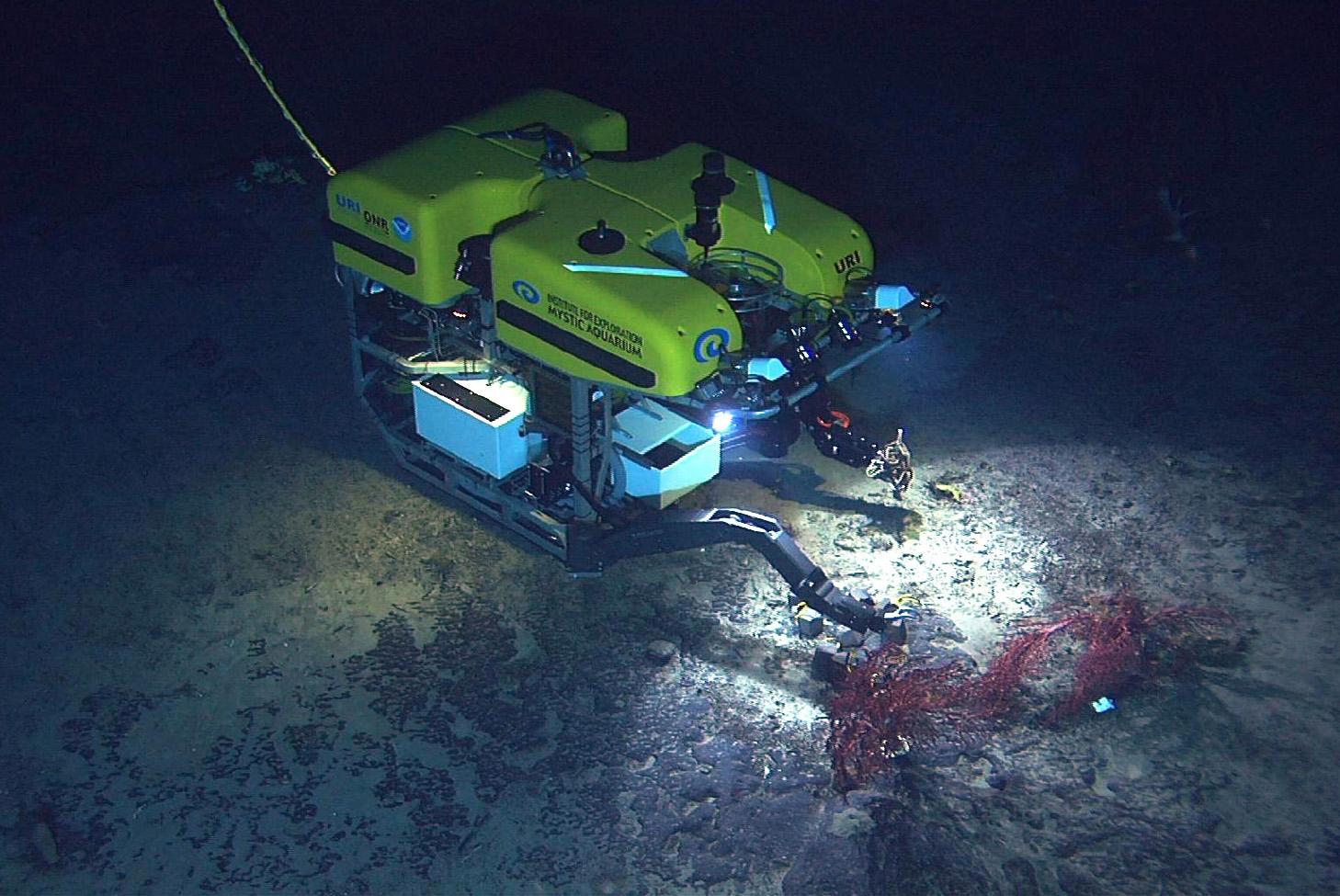
The ROV Hercules recovers an experiment from the New England Seamounts.

A remotely operated underwater vehicle (ROUV) or remotely operated vehicle (ROV) is a free-swimming submersible craft. ROVs are underwater machines that are often used to explore the ocean depth while being operated by people at the surface, usually from a control room. ROVs are used to perform underwater observation, inspection, and physical tasks such as valve operations, hydraulic functions, and other general tasks within the subsea oil and gas industry, military, scientific and other applications. ROVs can also carry tooling packages for undertaking specific tasks such as pull-in and connection of flexible flowlines and umbilicals, and component replacement. They are often used to do research and commercial work at great depths beyond the capacities of most submersibles and divers. Most users of the machines use the term "remotely operated vehicle" (ROV).

== Description ==
This meaning is different from remote control vehicles operating on land or in the air because ROVs are designed specifically to function in underwater environments, where conditions such as high pressure, limited visibility, and the effects of buoyancy and water currents pose unique challenges. While land and aerial vehicles use wireless communication for control, ROVs typically rely on a physical connection, such as a tether or umbilical cable, to transmit power, video, and data signals, ensuring reliable operation even at great depths. The tether also provides a stable means of communication, which is crucial in underwater conditions where radio waves are absorbed quickly by water, making wireless signals ineffective for long-range underwater use.

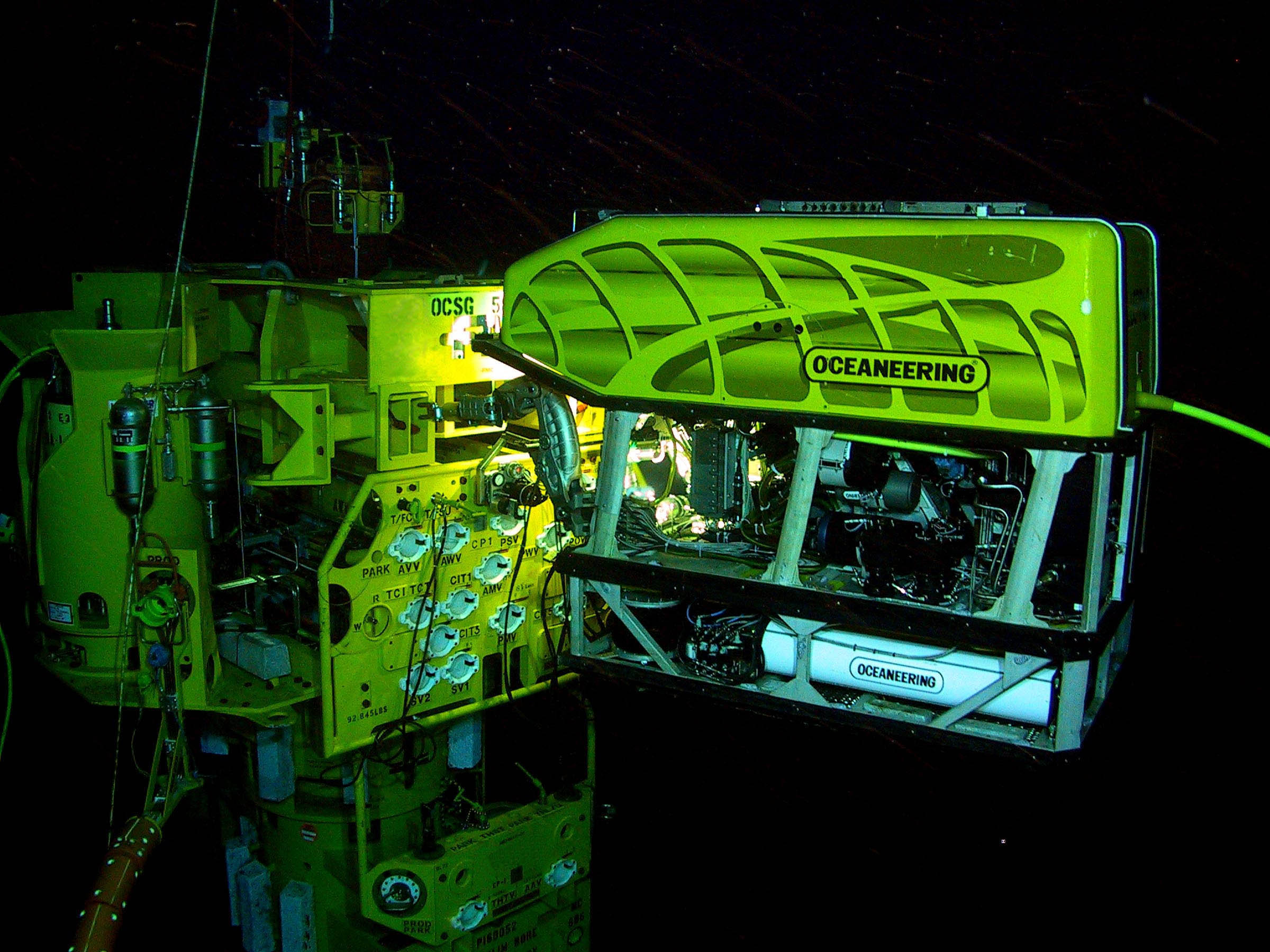
An ROV uses a torque wrench to adjust a valve in an underwater oil and gas field.

ROVs are unoccupied, usually highly maneuverable, and operated by a crew either aboard a vessel/floating platform or on proximate land. They are common in deepwater industries such as offshore hydrocarbon extraction. They are generally, but not necessarily, linked to a host ship by a neutrally buoyant tether or, often when working in rough conditions or in deeper water, a load-carrying umbilical cable is used along with a tether management system (TMS). The TMS is either a garage-like device which contains the ROV during lowering through the splash zone or, on larger work-class ROVs, a separate assembly mounted on top of the ROV. The purpose of the TMS is to lengthen and shorten the tether so the effect of cable drag where there are underwater currents is minimized. The umbilical cable is an armored cable that contains a group of electrical conductors and fiber optics that carry electric power, video, and data signals between the operator and the TMS. Where used, the TMS then relays the signals and power for the ROV down the tether cable. Once at the ROV, the electric power is distributed between the components of the ROV. However, in high-power applications, most of the electric power drives a high-power electric motor which drives a hydraulic pump. The pump is then used for propulsion and to power equipment such as torque tools and manipulator arms where electric motors would be too difficult to implement subsea. Most ROVs are equipped with at least a video camera and lights. Additional equipment is commonly added to expand the vehicle's capabilities. These may include sonars, magnetometers, a still camera, a manipulator or cutting arm, water samplers, and instruments that measure water clarity, water temperature, water density, sound velocity, light penetration, and temperature.

The major discoveries and scientific and historical contributions made possible by ROVs span several fields:

1. Underwater Archaeology and Historic Shipwrecks

ROVs have enabled the location, documentation, and study of historic shipwrecks lying at depths inaccessible to traditional divers:

The Titanic: The famous wreck, resting at a depth of approximately 3,800 meters in the Atlantic Ocean, was discovered and extensively explored using remotely operated vehicles (such as *Jason* and *Kuroshio*); these allowed for the mapping of the ship's condition and the recovery of historical artifacts.

Ancient and Roman-era shipwrecks: Many merchant vessels that sank in the Mediterranean Sea, laden with amphorae and archaeological treasures, have been discovered and protected thanks to high-resolution mapping performed by ROVs.

2. Marine Biology and New Species

Discover new species: Hundreds of previously unknown marine organisms—including deep-water corals, unique crustaceans, giant jellyfish, and abyssal fish—have been filmed and cataloged in their natural habitats.

Studying extreme ecosystems: They have enabled the analysis of biological communities living around hydrothermal vents (black and white smokers), demonstrating that life can thrive even in the absence of sunlight by utilizing chemosynthesis instead of photosynthesis.

3. Geology and Plate Tectonics

Mapping mid-ocean ridges: ROVs have allowed for close-up observation of underwater volcanism, Earth's crustal fractures, and the formation of new oceanic crust along mid-ocean ridges.

Geological samples: Using precision robotic arms, ROVs can collect rock, mineral, and sediment samples from the most remote seafloors for laboratory analysis, thereby improving our understanding of the planet's geological history.

4. Environmental and Anthropogenic Monitoring

Climate impact and pollution: ROVs are used to monitor the health of deep-sea coral reefs, assess damage caused by coral bleaching events, and document the presence of microplastics and debris on the ocean floor.

Ecological disasters: In the event of oil spills or underwater industrial accidents (such as the Deepwater Horizon disaster in the Gulf of Mexico), ROVs have played a crucial role in sealing crude oil leaks at great depths and monitoring environmental impact.

== Classification ==
Submersible ROVs are normally classified into categories based on their size, weight, ability or power. Some common ratings are:

- Micro - typically Micro-class ROVs are very small in size and weight. Today's Micro-Class ROVs can weigh less than 3 kg. These ROVs are used as an alternative to a diver, specifically in places where a diver might not be able to physically enter such as a sewer, pipeline or small cavity.
- Mini - typically Mini-Class ROVs weigh in around 15 kg. Mini-Class ROVs are also used as a diver alternative. One person may be able to transport the complete ROV system out with them on a small boat, deploy it, and complete the job without diver intervention. Some Micro and Mini classes are referred to as "eyeball"-class to differentiate them from ROVs that may be able to perform intervention tasks.
- General - typically less than 5 HP (propulsion); occasionally small three finger manipulators grippers have been installed, such as on the very early RCV 225. These ROVs may be able to carry an imaging sonar unit and are usually used on light survey applications. Typically the maximum working depth is less than 1,000 meters though one has been developed to go as deep as 7,000 meters.
- Inspection Class - these are typically rugged commercial or industrial use observation and data gathering ROVs - typically equipped with live-feed video, still photography, imaging sonar, ultra-short baseline acoustic positioning system (USBL), cathodic protection (CP) probe, ultra-sonic thickness (UT) gauge, and other data collection sensors. Inspection Class ROVs can also have manipulator arms for light work and object manipulation.
- Light Workclass - typically less than 50 hp (propulsion). These ROVs may be able to carry some manipulators. Their chassis may be made from polymers such as polyethylene rather than the conventional stainless steel or aluminium alloys. They typically have a maximum working depth less than 2000 m.
- Heavy Workclass - typically less than 220 hp (propulsion) with an ability to carry at least two manipulators. They have a working depth up to 3500 m and are capable of performing more technical tasks that involve great strength and dexterity.
- Trenching & Burial - typically more than 200 hp (propulsion) and not usually greater than 500 hp (while some do exceed that) with an ability to carry a cable laying sled and work at depths up to 6000 m in some cases.

Underwater ROVs may be "free swimming" where they operate neutrally buoyant on a tether directly from the launch ship or platform, or they may be "garaged" where they operate from a heavy submersible "garage" or "tophat" on a tether deployed from the garage which is lowered from the ship or platform. Both techniques have their pros and cons; however very deep work is normally done with a garage.

== History ==
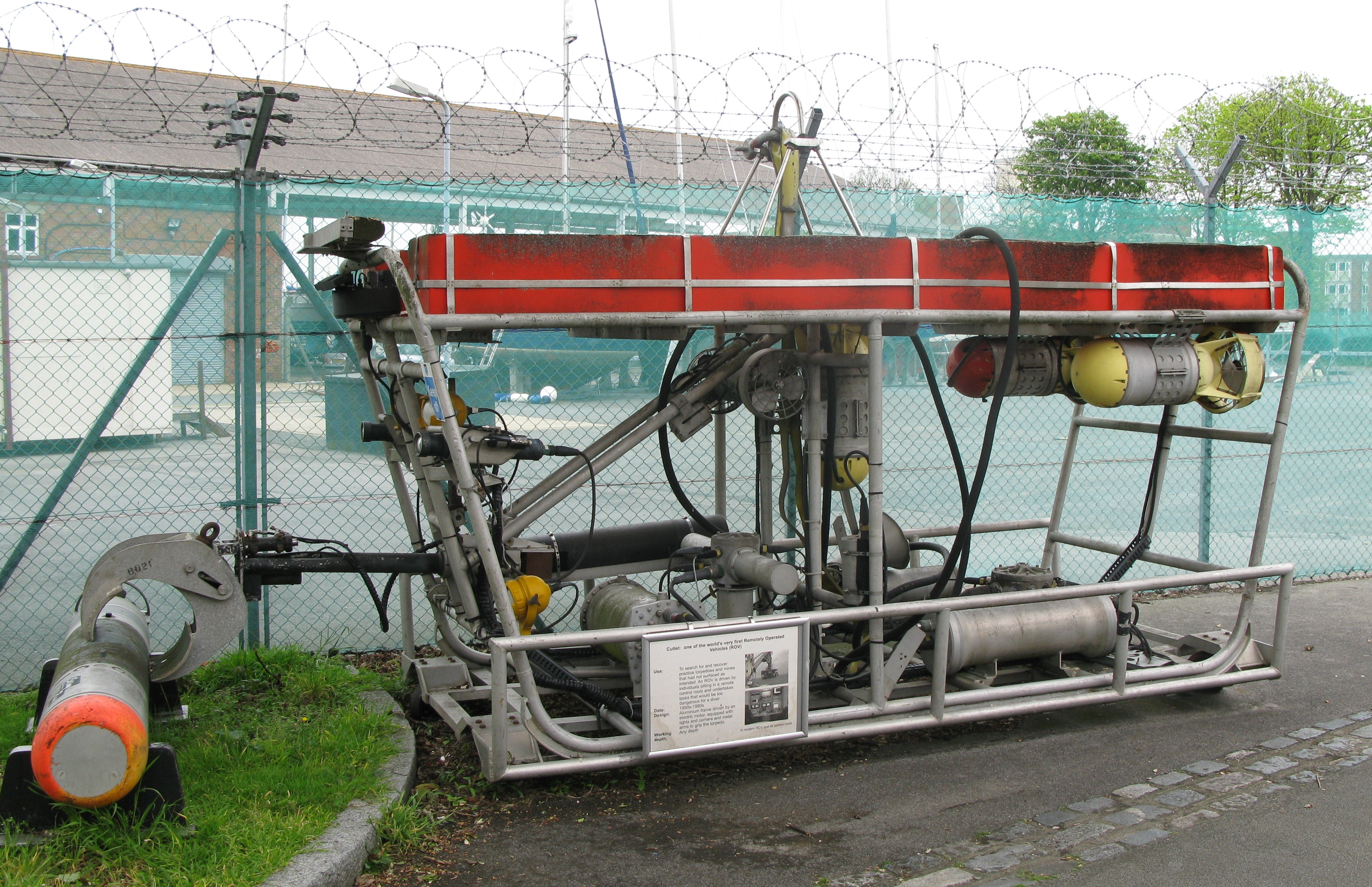
A Royal Navy ROV Cutlet used in the 1950s to retrieve practice torpedoes and mines

The first ROV, named POODLE, was developed in 1953 by the French engineer and underwater photographer Dimitri Rebikoff. It was initially designed as an underwater camera platform and was later developed further because of naval interest in remotely operated underwater vehicles. The U.S. Navy funded most of the early ROV technology development in the 1960s into what was then named a "Cable-Controlled Underwater Recovery Vehicle" (CURV). This created the capability to perform deep-sea rescue operation and recover objects from the ocean floor, such as a nuclear bomb lost in the Mediterranean Sea after the 1966 Palomares B-52 crash. Building on this technology base; the offshore oil and gas industry created the work-class ROVs to assist in the development of offshore oil fields. In the 1970s and '80s the Royal Navy used "Cutlet", a remotely operated submersible, to recover practice torpedoes and mines. RCA (Noise) maintained the "Cutlet 02" System based at BUTEC ranges, whilst the "03" system was based at the submarine base on the Clyde and was operated and maintained by RN personnel. More than a couple of decades after they were first introduced, ROVs became essential in the 1980s when much of the new offshore development exceeded the reach of human divers. During the mid-1980s the marine ROV industry suffered from serious stagnation in technological development caused in part by a drop in the price of oil and a global economic recession. Since then, technological development in the ROV industry has accelerated and today ROVs perform numerous tasks in many fields. Their tasks range from simple inspection of subsea structures, pipelines, and platforms, to connecting pipelines and placing underwater manifolds. They are used extensively both in the initial construction of a sub-sea development and the subsequent repair and maintenance. The oil and gas industry has expanded beyond the use of work class ROVs to mini ROVs, which can be more useful in shallower environments. They are smaller in size, oftentimes allowing for lower costs and faster deployment times.

Submersible ROVs have been used to identify many historic shipwrecks, including the RMS Titanic, the Bismarck, USS Yorktown, the SM U-111, and SS Central America. In some cases, such as the Titanic and the SS Central America, ROVs have been used to recover material from the sea floor and bring it to the surface, the most recent being in July 2024 during a Titanic expedition in recovering artefacts for the first time through a magnetometer.

While the oil and gas industry uses the majority of ROVs, other applications include science, military, and salvage. The military uses ROV for tasks such as mine clearing and inspection. Science usage is discussed below.

== Construction ==
Work-class ROVs are built with a large flotation pack on top of an aluminium chassis to provide the necessary buoyancy to perform a variety of tasks. The sophistication of construction of the aluminum frame varies depending on the manufacturer's design. Syntactic foam is often used for the flotation material. A tooling skid may be fitted at the bottom of the system to accommodate a variety of sensors or tooling packages. By placing the light components on the top and the heavy components on the bottom, the overall system has a large separation between the center of buoyancy and the center of gravity: this provides stability and the stiffness to do work underwater. Thrusters are placed between center of buoyancy and center of gravity to maintain the attitude stability of the robot in maneuvers. Various thruster configurations and control algorithms can be used to give appropriate positional and attitude control during the operations, particularly in high current waters. Thrusters are usually in a balanced vector configuration to provide the most precise control possible.

Electrical components can be in oil-filled water tight compartments or one-atmosphere compartments to protect them from corrosion in seawater and being crushed by the extreme pressure exerted on the ROV while working deep. The ROV will be fitted with thrusters, cameras, lights, tether, a frame, and pilot controls to perform basic work. Additional sensors, such as manipulators and sonar, can be fitted as needed for specific tasks. It is common to find ROVs with two robotic arms; each manipulator may have a different gripping jaw. The cameras may also be guarded for protection against collisions.

The majority of the work-class ROVs are built as described above; however, this is not the only style in ROV building method. Smaller ROVs can have very different designs, each appropriate to its intended task. Larger ROVs are commonly deployed and operated from vessels, so the ROV may have landing skids for retrieval to the deck.

== Configurations ==
Remotely operated vehicles have two basic configurations. Each of these brings specific limitations.

- Open or box frame ROVs - this is the most familiar of the ROV configurations - consisting of an open frame where all the operational sensors, thrusters, and mechanical components are enclosed. These are useful for free-swimming in light currents (less than 4 knots based upon manufacturer specifications). These are not suitable for towed applications due to their very poor hydrodynamic design. Most Work-Class and Heavy Work-Class ROVs are based upon this configuration.
- Torpedo shaped ROVs - this is a common configuration for data gathering or inspection class ROVs. The torpedo shape offers low hydrodynamic resistance, but comes with significant control limitations. The torpedo shape requires high speed (which is why this shape is used for military munitions) to remain positionally and attitudinally stable, but this type is highly vulnerable at high speed. At slow speeds (0–4 knots) suffers from numerous instabilities, such as tether induced roll and pitch, current induced roll, pitch, and yaw. It has limited control surfaces at the tail or stern, which easily cause over compensation instabilities. These are frequently referred to as "Tow Fish", since they are more often used as a towed ROV.

== Tether management ==
ROVs require a tether, or an umbilical, (unlike an AUV) in order to transmit power and data between the vehicle and the surface. The size and weight of the tether should be considered: too large of a tether will adversely affect the drag of the vehicle, and too small may not be robust enough for lifting requirements during launch and recovery.

The tether is typically spooled onto a tether management system (TMS) which helps manage the tether so that it does not become tangled or knotted. In some situations it can be used as a winch to lower or recover the vehicle.

== Applications ==
=== Survey ===
Tim Renson explains the use of a ROV for inspecting mussel farms.

Survey or inspection ROVs are generally smaller than work class ROVs and are often sub-classified as either Class I: Observation Only or Class II Observation with payload. They are used to assist with hydrographic survey, i.e. the location and positioning of subsea structures, and also for inspection work for example pipeline surveys, jacket inspections and marine hull inspection of vessels. Survey ROVs (also known as "eyeballs"), although smaller than workclass, often have comparable performance with regard to the ability to hold position in currents, and often carry similar tools and equipment - lighting, cameras, sonar, ultra-short baseline (USBL) beacon, Raman spectrometer, and strobe flasher depending on the payload capability of the vehicle and the needs of the user.

=== Support of diving operations ===
ROV operations in conjunction with simultaneous diving operations are under the overall supervision of the diving supervisor for safety reasons.

The International Marine Contractors Association (IMCA) published guidelines for the offshore operation of ROVs in combined operations with divers in the document Remotely Operated Vehicle Intervention During Diving Operations (IMCA D 054, IMCA R 020), intended for use by both contractors and clients.

Remotely operated vehicles might be used during Submarine rescue operations.

=== Media ===
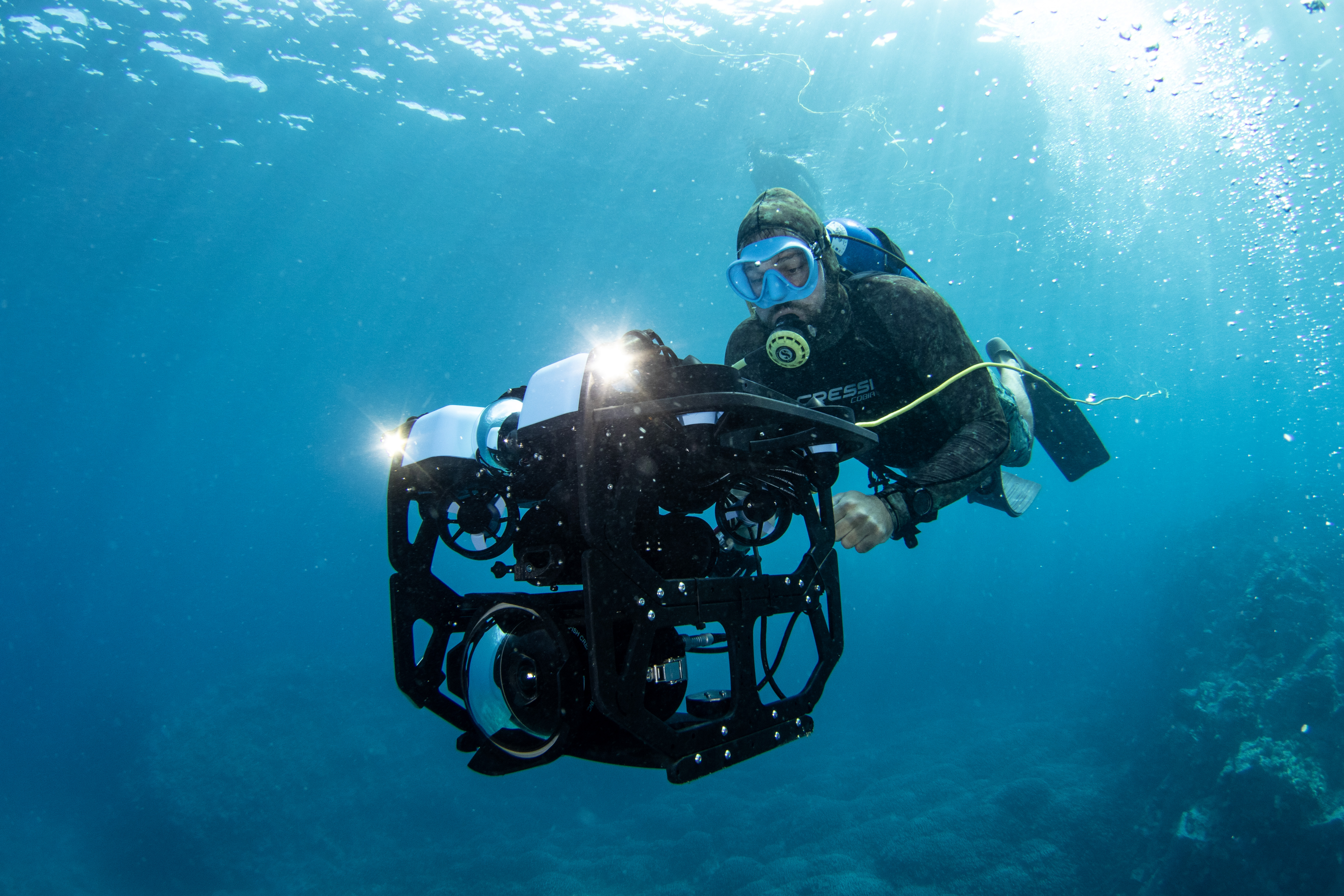
BlueROV2 equipped with 4K camera

As cameras and sensors have evolved and vehicles have become more agile and simple to pilot, ROVs have become popular particularly with documentary filmmakers due to their ability to access deep, dangerous, and confined areas unattainable by divers. There is no limit to how long an ROV can be submerged and capturing footage, which allows for previously unseen perspectives to be gained. ROVs have been used in the filming of several documentaries, including Nat Geo's Shark Men and The Dark Secrets of the Lusitania and the BBC Wildlife Special Spy in the Huddle.

Due to their extensive use by military, law enforcement, and coastguard services, ROVs have also featured in crime dramas such as the popular CBS series CSI.

=== Hobby ===
With growing interest in the ocean among people of all ages, and the rising availability of equipment that was once expensive and inaccessible, ROVs have become a popular pursuit for many hobbyists. This hobby involves the construction of small ROVs that generally are made out of PVC piping and often can dive to depths between 50 and 100 feet, however, some have managed to get to 300 feet.

== Science ==
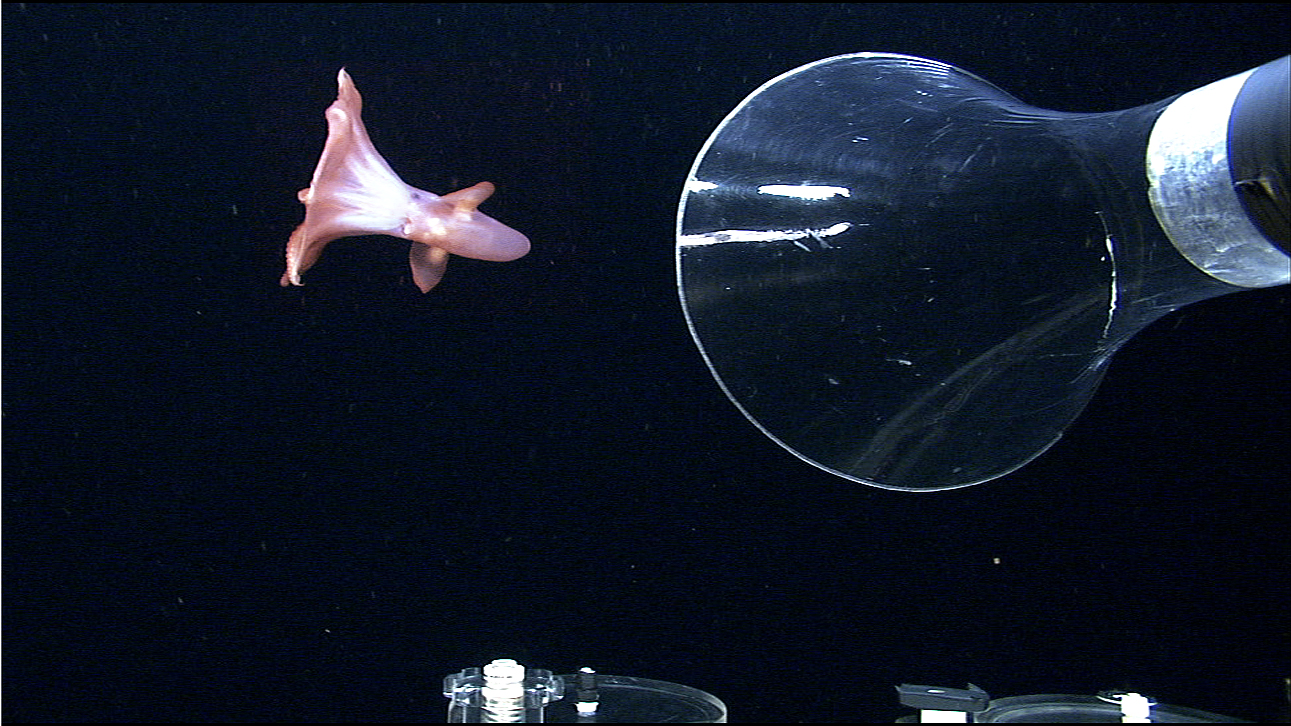
A ROV's suction device about to capture a specimen of the deep sea octopus Cirroteuthis muelleri

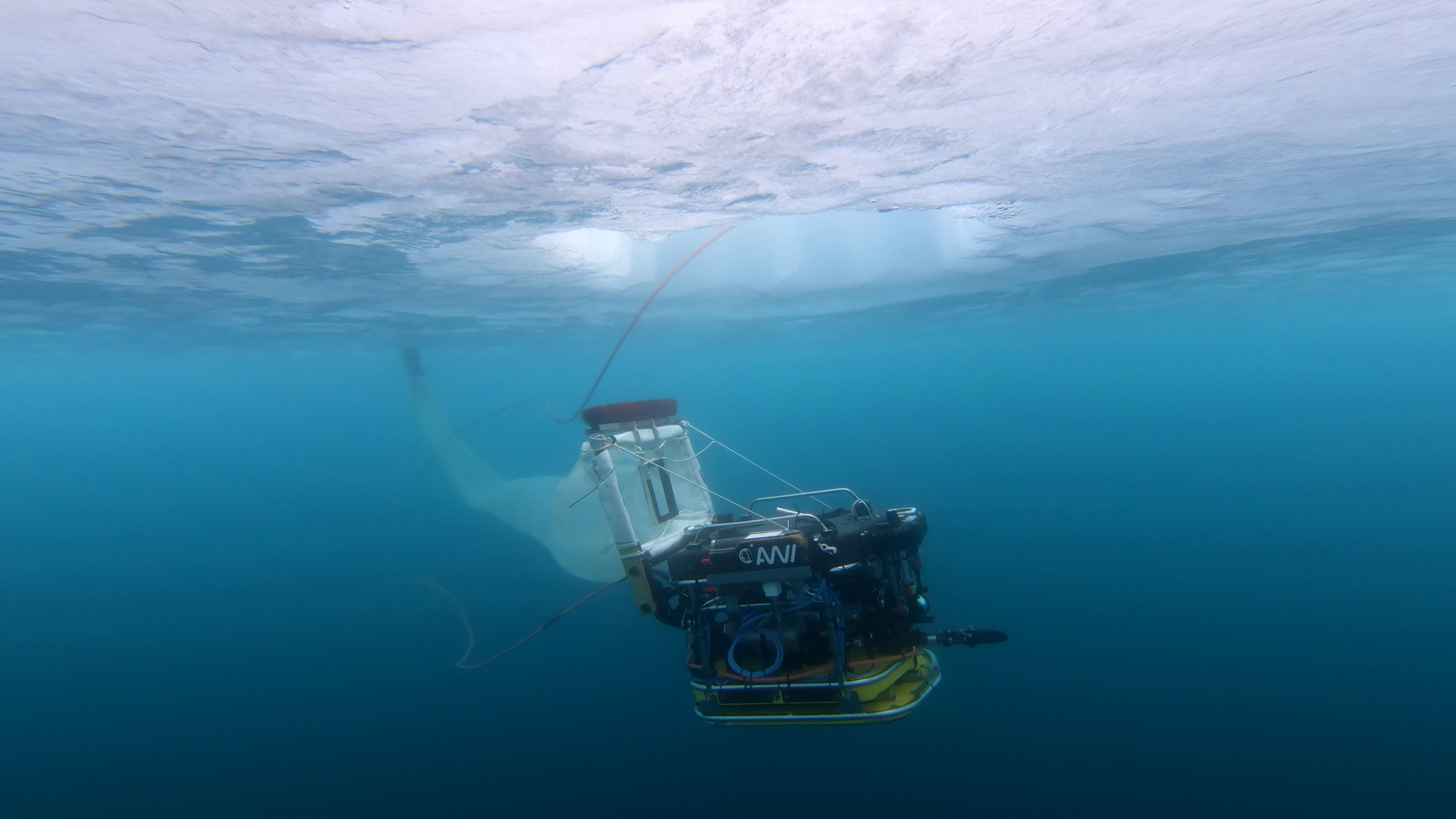
ROV of Alfred Wegener Institute equipped with plankton nets sampling under Arctic sea ice measuring light transmittance and ice thickness

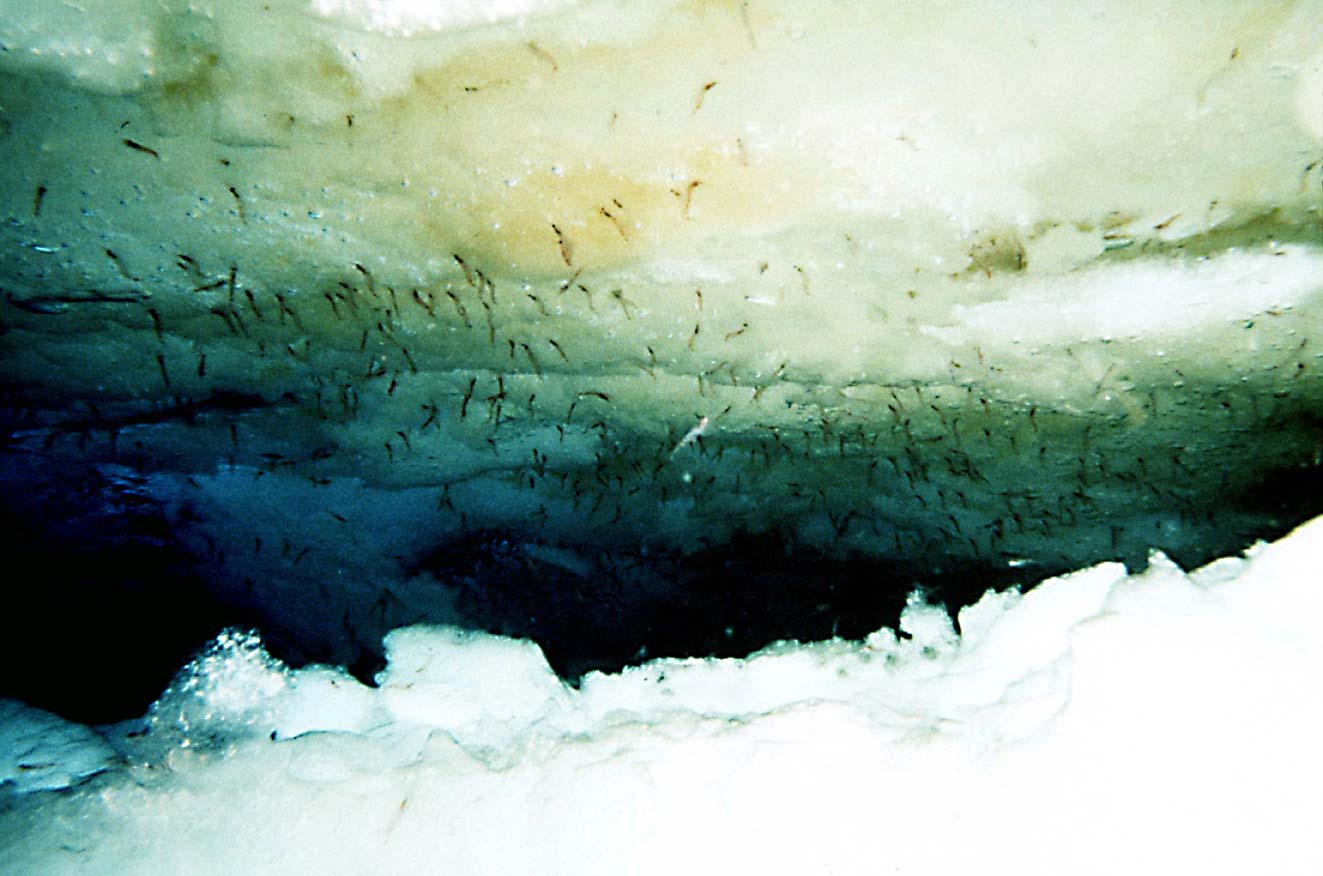
Image taken by a ROV of krill feeding on ice algae in Antarctica

ROVs are also used extensively by the scientific community to study the ocean. Many deep-sea animals and other organisms have been discovered or studied in their natural environment through the use of ROVs; examples include the jellyfish Stellamedusa ventana and the eel-like halosaurs. In the US, cutting-edge work is done at several public and private oceanographic institutions, including the Monterey Bay Aquarium Research Institute (MBARI), the Woods Hole Oceanographic Institution (WHOI) (with Nereus), and the University of Rhode Island / Institute for Exploration (URI/IFE). In Europe, Alfred Wegener Institute use ROVs for Arctic and Antarctic surveys of sea ice, including measuring ice draft, light transmittance, sediments, oxygen, nitrate, seawater temperature, and salinity. For these purposes, it is equipped with a single- and multibeam sonar, spectroradiometer, manipulator, fluorometer, conductivity/ temperature/depth (salinity measurement) (CTD), optode, and UV-spectrometer.

Since good video footage is a core component of most deep-sea scientific research, research ROVs tend to be outfitted with high-output lighting systems and broadcast quality cameras. Depending on the research being conducted, a science ROV will be equipped with various sampling devices and sensors. Many of these devices are one-of-a-kind, state-of-the-art experimental components that have been configured to work in the extreme environment of the deep ocean. Science ROVs also incorporate a good deal of technology that has been developed for the commercial ROV sector, such as hydraulic manipulators and highly accurate subsea navigation systems. They are also used for underwater archaeology projects such as the Mardi Gras Shipwreck Project in the Gulf of Mexico and the CoMAS project in the Mediterranean Sea.

There are several high-end systems that are notable for their capabilities and applications. MBARI's Tiburon vehicle cost over $6 million US dollars to develop and is used primarily for midwater and hydrothermal research on the West Coast of the US. WHOI's Jason system has made many significant contributions to deep-sea oceanographic research and continues to work all over the globe. URI/IFE's Hercules ROV is one of the first science ROVs to fully incorporate a hydraulic propulsion system and is outfitted to survey and excavate ancient and modern shipwrecks. The Canadian Scientific Submersible Facility ROPOS system is continually used by several leading ocean sciences institutions and universities for challenging tasks such as deep-sea vents recovery and exploration to the maintenance and deployment of ocean observatories.

=== List of scientific ROVs ===
ROV name	Operator	Years in operation
ROPOS	Canadian Scientific Submergence Facility	1986–present
Jason	WHOI	1988–present
ROV Ventana	MBARI	1988–present
Kaikō	JAMSTEC	1993–2003
ROV Tiburon	MBARI	1996–2008
Victor 6000	IFREMER	1999–present
ISIS	National Oceanography Centre	2003–present
ROV Hercules	Nautilus Live Ocean Exploration Trust	2003–present
MARUM-QUEST	MARUM	2003–present
ROV Kiel	GEOMAR	2007–present
ABISMO	JAMSTEC	2007–present
Nereus	WHOI	2009–2014
ROV Doc Ricketts	MBARI	2009–present
V8 Offshore	University of Gothenburg	2011–present
Luʻukai	University of Hawaiʻi at Mānoa	2013–present
Deep Discoverer	Global Foundation for Ocean Exploration	2013–present
Ægir6000	UiB	2015–present
MARUM-SQUID	MARUM	2015–present
SuBastian	Schmidt Ocean Institute	2016–present
AURORA	REV Ocean	2021–present

== Education and outreach ==
The SeaPerch Remotely Operated Underwater Vehicle (ROV) educational program is an educational tool and kit that allows elementary, middle, and high-school students to construct a simple, remotely operated underwater vehicle, from polyvinyl chloride (PVC) pipe and other readily made materials. The SeaPerch program teaches students basic skills in ship and submarine design and encourages students to explore naval architecture and marine and ocean engineering concepts. SeaPerch is sponsored by the Office of Naval Research, as part of the National Naval Responsibility for Naval Engineering (NNRNE), and the program is managed by the Society of Naval Architects and Marine Engineers.

Another innovative use of ROV technology was during the Mardi Gras Shipwreck Project. The "Mardi Gras Shipwreck" sank some 200 years ago about 35 miles off the coast of Louisiana in the Gulf of Mexico in 4,000 feet (1,200 meters) of water. The shipwreck, whose real identity remains a mystery, lay forgotten at the bottom of the sea until it was discovered in 2002 by an oilfield inspection crew working for the Okeanos Gas Gathering Company (OGGC). In May 2007, an expedition, led by Texas A&M University and funded by OGGC under an agreement with the Minerals Management Service (now BOEM), was launched to undertake the deepest scientific archaeological excavation ever attempted at that time to study the site on the seafloor and recover artifacts for eventual public display in the Louisiana State Museum. As part of the educational outreach Nautilus Productions in partnership with BOEM, Texas A&M University, the Florida Public Archaeology Network and Veolia Environmental produced a one-hour HD documentary about the project, short videos for public viewing and provided video updates during the expedition. Video footage from the ROV was an integral part of this outreach and used extensively in the Mystery Mardi Gras Shipwreck documentary.

The Marine Advanced Technology Education (MATE) Center uses ROVs to teach middle school, high school, community college, and university students about ocean-related careers and help them improve their science, technology, engineering, and math skills. MATE's annual student ROV competition challenges student teams from all over the world to compete with ROVs that they design and build. The competition uses realistic ROV-based missions that simulate a high-performance workplace environment, focusing on a different theme that exposes students to many different aspects of marine-related technical skills and occupations. The ROV competition is organized by MATE and the Marine Technology Society's ROV Committee and funded by organizations such as the National Aeronautics and Space Administration (NASA), National Oceanic and Atmospheric Administration (NOAA), and Oceaneering, and many other organizations that recognize the value of highly trained students with technology skills such as ROV designing, engineering, and piloting. MATE was established with funding from the National Science Foundation and is headquartered at Monterey Peninsula College in Monterey, California.

The interest in ROVs has led to the formation of many competitions, including MATE (Marine Advanced Technology Education), NURC (National Underwater Robotics Challenge), and RoboSub. These are competitions in which competitors, most commonly schools and other organizations, compete against each other in a series of tasks using ROVs that they have built. Most hobby ROVs are tested in swimming pools and lakes where the water is calm, however some have tested their own personal ROVs in the sea. Doing so, however, creates many difficulties due to waves and currents that can cause the ROV to stray off course or struggle to push through the surf due to the small size of engines that are fitted to most hobby ROVs.

== Military use ==
ROVs have been used by several navies for decades, primarily for minehunting and minebreaking.

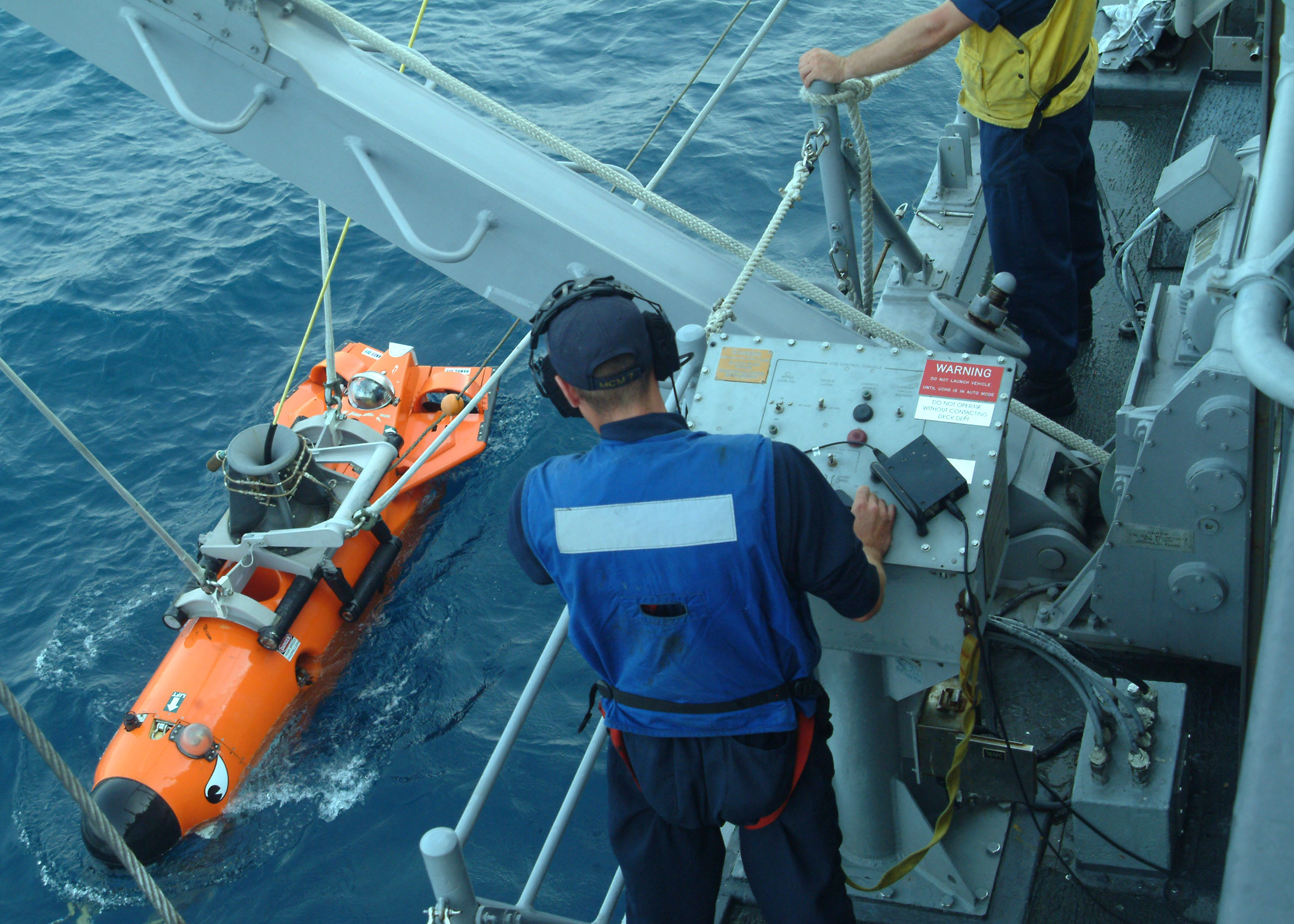
AN/SLQ-48 Mine Neutralization Vehicle

In October 2008 the U.S. Navy began to improve its locally piloted rescue systems, based on the Mystic DSRV and support craft, with a modular system, the SRDRS, based on a tethered, occupied ROV called a pressurized rescue module (PRM). This followed years of tests and exercises with submarines from the fleets of several nations. It also uses the uncrewed Sibitzky ROV for disabled submarine surveying and preparation of the submarine for the PRM.

The US Navy also uses an ROV called AN/SLQ-48 Mine Neutralization Vehicle (MNV) for mine warfare. It can go 1,000 yards (910 m) away from the ship due to a connecting cable, and can reach 2,000 feet (610 m) deep. The mission packages available for the MNV are known as MP1, MP2, and MP3.

- The MP1 is a cable cutter to surface the moored mine for recovery exploitation or explosive ordnance disposal (EOD).
- The MP2 is a bomblet of 75 lb (34 kg) polymer-bonded explosive PBXN-103 high explosive for neutralizing bottom/ground mines.
- The MP3 is a moored mine cable gripper and a float with the MP2 bomblet combination to neutralize moored mines underwater.

The charges are detonated by acoustic signal from the ship.

The AN/BLQ-11 autonomous uncrewed undersea vehicle (UUV) is designed for covert mine countermeasure capability and can be launched from certain submarines.

The U.S.Navy's ROVs are only on Avenger-class mine countermeasures ships. After the grounding of USS Guardian (MCM-5) and decommissioning of USS Avenger (MCM-1), and USS Defender (MCM-2), only 11 US Minesweepers remain operating in the coastal waters of Bahrain (USS Sentry (MCM-3), USS Devastator (MCM-6), USS Gladiator (MCM-11) and USS Dextrous (MCM-13)), Japan (USS Patriot (MCM-7), USS Pioneer (MCM-9), USS Warrior (MCM-10) and USS Chief (MCM-14)), and California (USS Champion (MCM-4), USS Scout (MCM-8), and USS Ardent (MCM-12) ).

During August 19, 2011, a Boeing-made robotic submarine dubbed Echo Ranger was being tested for possible use by the U.S. military to stalk enemy waters, patrol local harbors for national security threats and scour ocean floors to detect environmental hazards. The Norwegian Navy inspected the ship Helge Ingstad by the Norwegian Blueye Pioneer underwater drone.

As their abilities grow, smaller inspection class ROVs are also increasingly being adopted by navies, coast guards, and port authorities around the globe, including the U.S. Coast Guard and U.S. Navy, Royal Netherlands Navy, Norwegian Navy, Royal Navy, Indonesia Navy, New Zealand Navy, Swedish Navy, Canadian Armed Forces, Finnish Navy, French Navy, Ministry of Defence, and the Saudi Border Guard. These military-grade ROVs are useful for a variety of underwater inspection tasks such as explosive ordnance disposal (EOD), meteorology, port security, mine countermeasures (MCM), mine neutralization, and maritime intelligence, surveillance, reconnaissance (ISR).

=== Public Safety ===
ROVs have also been widely adopted by law enforcement, public safety, and search and recovery (SAR) teams for underwater evidence retrieval, victim recovery, disaster response, safety inspections, salvage operations, flood response, and mission persons location. A supplementary tool to public safety dive teams, these ROVs are often times deployed as a "pre-dive check" to ensure safe conditions before sending a human diver underwater. As the popularity of these tools has grown, public and private agencies have begun receiving grant funding to support the purchase of such vehicles, some organizations, such as the Maricopa County Sheriff's Office, are even going so far as to establish dedicated Remotely Operated Vehicle Units (ROV-U) to meet the growing demand for ROV applications in public safety operations.

== Specific vehicles ==
- Echo Ranger – Marine autonomous underwater vehicle built by Boeing
- Edokko-1 – Deep water remotely operated vehicle
- Eelume – An autonomous underwater vehicle for inspection, maintenance, and repair
- Global Explorer ROV – Deep water science and survey remotely operated vehicle
- Nereus (underwater vehicle) – Hybrid remotely operated or autonomous underwater vehicle
- PantheROV – Remotely operated vehicle built by undergraduate students at the University of Wisconsin–Milwaukee
- Scorpio ROV – Work class remotely operated underwater vehicle
- VideoRay UROVs – Series of inspection class remotely operated underwater vehicles

== See also ==
- Autonomous underwater vehicle – Uncrewed underwater vehicle with autonomous guidance system
- Helix Energy Solutions Group – Provider of offshore services and ROV operations
- Subsea technology – Technology of submerged operations in the sea
- Underwater acoustic positioning system – Sound-based navigation and tracking of vessels
- UNESCO Convention on the Protection of the Underwater Cultural Heritage – Treaty adopted on 2 November 2001
- Robotic non-destructive testing – Method of inspection using remotely operated tools
- Radio-controlled submarine – Scale model of a submarine that can be steered via radio control
- Unmanned underwater vehicle – Submersible vehicles that can operate underwater without a human occupant
