= RoboNation =

US organization for science education

RoboNation (formerly the AUVSI Foundation) is a U.S.-based nonprofit organization (501(c)(3)) focused on promoting STEM and robotics education through national and international competitions. Its goal is to inspire and equip students to pursue careers in robotics and engineering.

== History and mission ==
Established in 2009 through a spin-off from the Association for Unmanned Vehicle Systems International (AUVSI), RoboNation received foundational support from AUVSI and early partners such as SolidWorks, Northrop Grumman, and Insitu. As an independent 501(c)(3), RoboNation supports programs that introduce students to hands-on robotics and promote careers in autonomous systems.

== Programs and competitions ==
RoboNation oversees multiple robotics competitions and educational initiatives that span ground, air, and maritime domains. These programs facilitate experiential STEM learning and include:

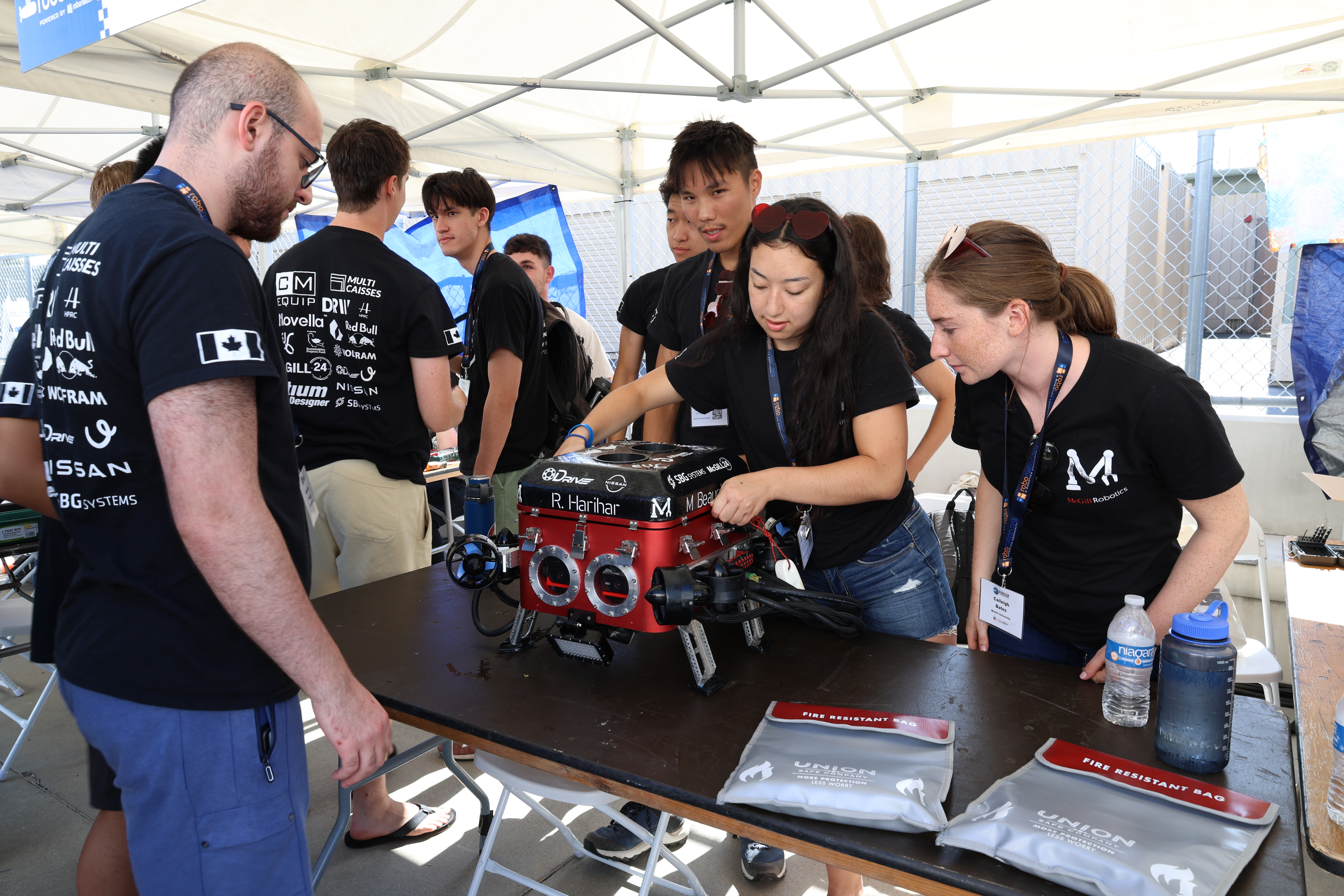
Students with vehicle at RoboSub

- SeaPerch: An introductory underwater ROV-building program for K–12 educators and students, delivering curriculum-aligned robotics education and teacher training.
- RoboSub: A global autonomous underwater vehicle (AUV) competition co-sponsored by RoboNation and the U.S. Office of Naval Research. Teams complete realistic underwater tasks, advancing the development of AUV technology and fostering engineering skills.
- RoboBoat: An international autonomous surface vehicle (ASV) competition where student teams design, build, and navigate ASVs through aquatic obstacle courses. It emphasizes systems engineering and maritime robotics skills.
- SUAS - An international uncrewed aerial systems competition where students design and operate autonomous drones in realistic mission scenarios, showcasing skills critical to the future of the UAS industry.

The competition course for the 2026 Maritime RobotX Challenge at Marina Bay, Singapore, where teams competed in autonomous maritime robotics tasks.

- IARC - An international aerial robotics challenge where innovators take on the impossible. At each event, participants move aerial robotics forward by attempting to solve significant and useful mission challenges that were initially considered "impossible" when they were proposed. It is the longest-running collegiate aerial robotics challenge in the world.
- RobotX - An international university competition where teams design and operate autonomous surface and aerial systems to tackle complex maritime tasks, advancing innovation in ocean robotics.
- IGVC - Student teams compete with their intelligent ground vehicles, testing technologies representing intelligent transportation systems, manufacturing and military mobility.

== Impact and reach ==
RoboNation engages hundreds of global teams each year in its competitions, helping bridge theoretical STEM understanding with applied engineering design and teamwork AUVSIM21. For example, the RoboSub competition is described as “an important key to keeping young engineers excited about careers in science, technology, engineering, and math.”
