= Echo Seeker =

Autonomous underwater vehicle built by Boeing

Echo Seeker is an autonomous underwater vehicle (AUV) built by Boeing.

The vehicle is a larger version of Boeing's earlier Echo Ranger AUV, and was designed and built by the company's Advanced Technology Programs division in Huntington Beach, California, which publicly unveiled Echo Seeker in July 2015. Echo Seeker measures about 32 feet (9.8 m) long, and is powered by a bank of silver zinc batteries that give it an endurance of about three days and a range of 265 miles (426 km) at its service speed of 3.5 miles per hour (3.0 kn). It has a payload of about 6,000 pounds (2,700 kg), and can submerge to a depth of 20,000 feet (6,100 m). Once deployed, Echo Seeker operates largely autonomously, with communication to the surface limited to a weak acoustic system. When submerged, it navigates via a synthetic aperture sonar system that allows it to map a 2 miles (3.2 km) wide swath of seabed with a resolution of 10 centimetres (3.9 in) from a height of 300 feet (91 m).
