= USS Independence (CVL-22) =

Independence-class light aircraft carrier of the US Navy

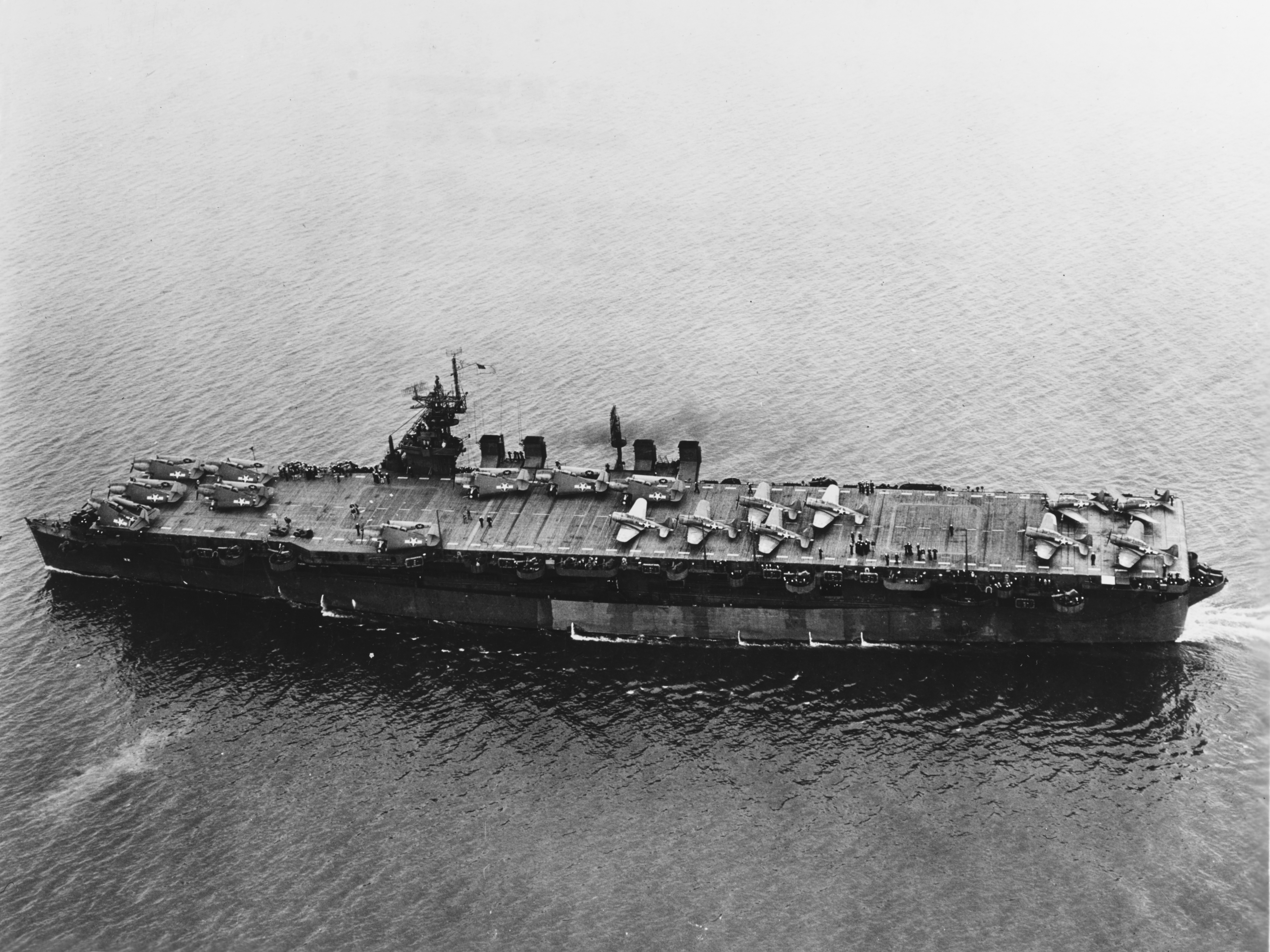
- USS Independence in San Francisco Bay, 15 July 1943

History

United States
- Name: Independence
- Builder: New York Shipbuilding Corporation
- Laid down: 1 May 1941
- Launched: 22 August 1942
- Commissioned: 14 January 1943
- Decommissioned: 28 August 1946
- Reclassified: CVL-22, 15 July 1943
- Fate: Target in nuclear weapons testing, 1946; scuttled 29 January 1951

General characteristics
- Class & type: Independence-class aircraft carrier
- Displacement: 10,662 tons standard, 14,751 tons loaded
- Length: 623 ft (190 m)
- Beam: 71.5 ft (21.8 m) (waterline); 109.2 ft (33.3 m) (extreme)
- Draft: 26 ft (7.9 m)
- Propulsion: General Electric turbines, 4 shafts, 4 boilers; 100,000 shp
- Speed: 31 knots (57 km/h)
- Range: 13,000 nautical miles (24,000 km) at 15 knots (28 km/h)
- Complement: 1,569 officers and men (inc. air group)
- Armament: 26 × Bofors 40 mm guns
- Aircraft carried: 34; 8 torpedo-bombers; 26 fighters;

USS Independence (CVL-22) (also CV-22) was a United States Navy light aircraft carrier. The lead ship of her class, she served during World War II.

Converted from the hull of a Cleveland-class light cruiser, she was built by the New York Shipbuilding Corporation and commissioned in January 1943. She took part in the attacks on Rabaul and Tarawa before being torpedoed by Japanese aircraft, necessitating repairs in San Francisco from January to July 1944.

After repairs, she launched many strikes against targets in Luzon and Okinawa. Independence was part of the carrier group that sank the remnants of the Japanese Mobile Fleet in the Battle of Leyte Gulf and several other Japanese ships in the Surigao Strait. Until the surrender of Japan, she was assigned to strike duties against targets in the Philippines and Japan. She finished her operational duty off the coast of Japan supporting occupation forces until being assigned to return American veterans back to the United States as part of Operation Magic Carpet.

Independence was later used as a target during the Operation Crossroads atomic bomb tests. After being transported back to Pearl Harbor and San Francisco for study, she was later sunk near the Farallon Islands.

== Construction and deployment ==
Begun as light cruiser Amsterdam, CL-59, she was launched as CV-22 on 22 August 1942 by New York Shipbuilding Corporation, Camden, New Jersey, sponsored by Mrs. Dorothy Warner, wife of Rawleigh Warner, Sr, Chairman of Pure Oil Co., and commissioned 14 January 1943.

The first of a new class of carriers converted from cruiser hulls, Independence conducted shakedown training in the Caribbean. She then steamed through the Panama Canal to join the Pacific Fleet, arriving at San Francisco on 3 July 1943. Independence got underway for Pearl Harbor 14 July, and after two weeks of training exercises sailed with carriers Essex and Yorktown for a raid on Marcus Island. Aircraft from the carrier force struck on 1 September and destroyed over 70 percent of the installations on the island. The carrier began her next operation, a similar strike against Wake Island 5 to 6 October as CVL-22, having been redesignated 15 July 1943.

=== Rabaul and Gilbert Islands strikes ===
Independence sailed from Pearl Harbor for Espiritu Santo on 21 October. During an ensuing carrier attack on Rabaul on 11 November, the ship's gunners scored their first success – six Japanese aircraft shot down. After this operation, the carrier refueled at Espiritu Santo, headed for the Gilbert Islands, and conducted pre-landing strikes on Tarawa 18 to 20 November 1943. During a Japanese counterattack on 20 November, Independence was attacked by a group of aircraft low on the water. Six were shot down, but the aircraft launched at least five torpedoes, one of which hit the carrier's starboard quarter. Seriously damaged, the ship steamed to Funafuti on 23 November for emergency repairs. Independence returned to San Francisco 2 January 1944 for more permanent repairs.

=== Refitting and training for night operations ===
The now-veteran carrier returned to Pearl Harbor 3 July 1944. During her repair period, the ship had been fitted with an additional catapult, and upon her arrival in Hawaiian waters, Independence began training for night carrier operations embarking the specially trained night fighter and torpedo units of Night Air Group 41 (NAG-41) in August. She continued this pioneering work 24 to 29 August out of Eniwetok. The ship sailed with a large task group 29 August to take part in the Palau operation and the Battle of Peleliu, aimed at securing bases for the final assault on the Philippines in October. Independence provided night reconnaissance and night combat air patrol for Task Force 38 during this operation.

=== Philippines ===
In September the fast carrier task force regularly pounded the Philippines in preparation for the invasion. When no Japanese counterattacks developed in this period, Independence shifted to regular daytime operations, striking targets on Luzon. After replenishment at Ulithi in early October, the great force sortied 6 October for Okinawa. In the days that followed the carriers struck Okinawa, Formosa, and the Philippines. Japanese air counterattacks were repulsed, with Independence providing day strike groups in addition to night fighters and reconnaissance aircraft for defensive protection.

As the carrier groups steamed east of the Philippines 23 October, it became apparent, as Admiral Carney later recalled, that "something on a grand scale was underfoot." And indeed it was, as the Japanese fleet moved in a three-pronged effort to turn back the American beachhead on Leyte Gulf. Aircraft from Independence's Task Group 38.2, under Rear Admiral Bogan, spotted Kurita's striking force in the Sibuyan Sea 24 October and the carriers launched a series of attacks. Aircraft from Task Group 38.2 and other task groups sank the battleship Musashi and disabled the heavy cruiser Myoko. Embarking a night carrier air group, Independence played no role in the attacks on Kurita's force on the 24th.

That evening Admiral Halsey made the decision to turn Task Force 38 northward in search of Admiral Ozawa's carrier group. Independence's night search aircraft made contact and shadowed the Japanese ships of the northern force until dawn on 25 October, when the carriers launched an attack. In this second part of the great Battle for Leyte Gulf, all four Japanese carriers were sunk. Meanwhile, American heavy ships had won a victory to secure the Surigao Strait; and an escort carrier force had outfought the remainder of Kurita's ships in the Battle off Samar; Independence sailed with TF38 during the destruction of Admiral Jisaburō Ozawa's northern diversion fleet off Cape Engaño. After the battle, which virtually spelled the end of the Japanese Navy as a major threat, Independence continued to provide search aircraft and night fighter protection for TF 38 in strikes against the Philippines.

Independence returned to Ulithi for long-delayed rest and replenishment 9 to 14 November, but soon got underway to operate off the Philippines on night attacks and defensive operations. This phase continued until 30 December 1944, when the task force sortied from Ulithi once more and moved northward. From 3 to 9 January 1945 the carriers supported the Lingayen landings on Luzon, after which Halsey took his fleet on a foray into the South China Sea. In the days that followed the aircraft struck at air bases on Formosa and on the coasts of Indo-China and China. These operations in support of the Philippines campaign marked the end of the carrier's night operations, and she sailed 30 January 1945 for repairs at Pearl Harbor.

=== Okinawa ===
Independence returned to Ulithi 13 March 1945 and got underway next day for operations against Okinawa. She carried out pre-invasion strikes 30 to 31 March, and after the assault 1 April remained off the island supplying combat air patrol and strike aircraft. Her aircraft shot down numerous enemy aircraft during the desperate Japanese attacks on the invasion force. Independence remained off Okinawa until 10 June when she sailed for Leyte.

During July and August the carrier took part in the final carrier strikes against Japan itself. After the end of the war 15 August, Independence aircraft continued surveillance flights over the mainland locating prisoner of war camps and covered the landings of Allied occupation troops. The ship departed Tokyo 22 September 1945, arriving at San Francisco via Saipan and Guam 31 October.

=== Operation Crossroads ===
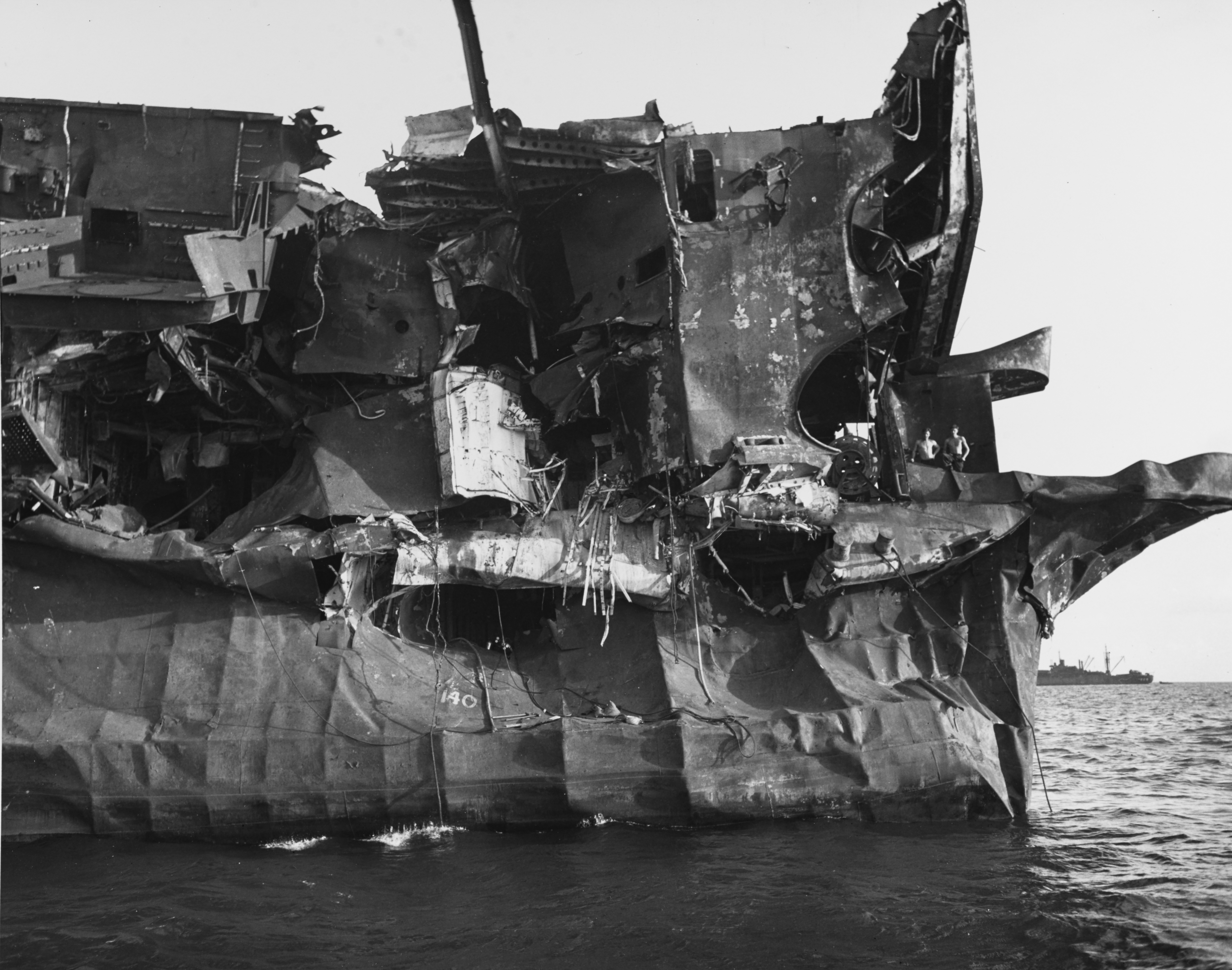
USS Independence "Gilda" test damage aft port quarter (note two sailors on the aft deck)

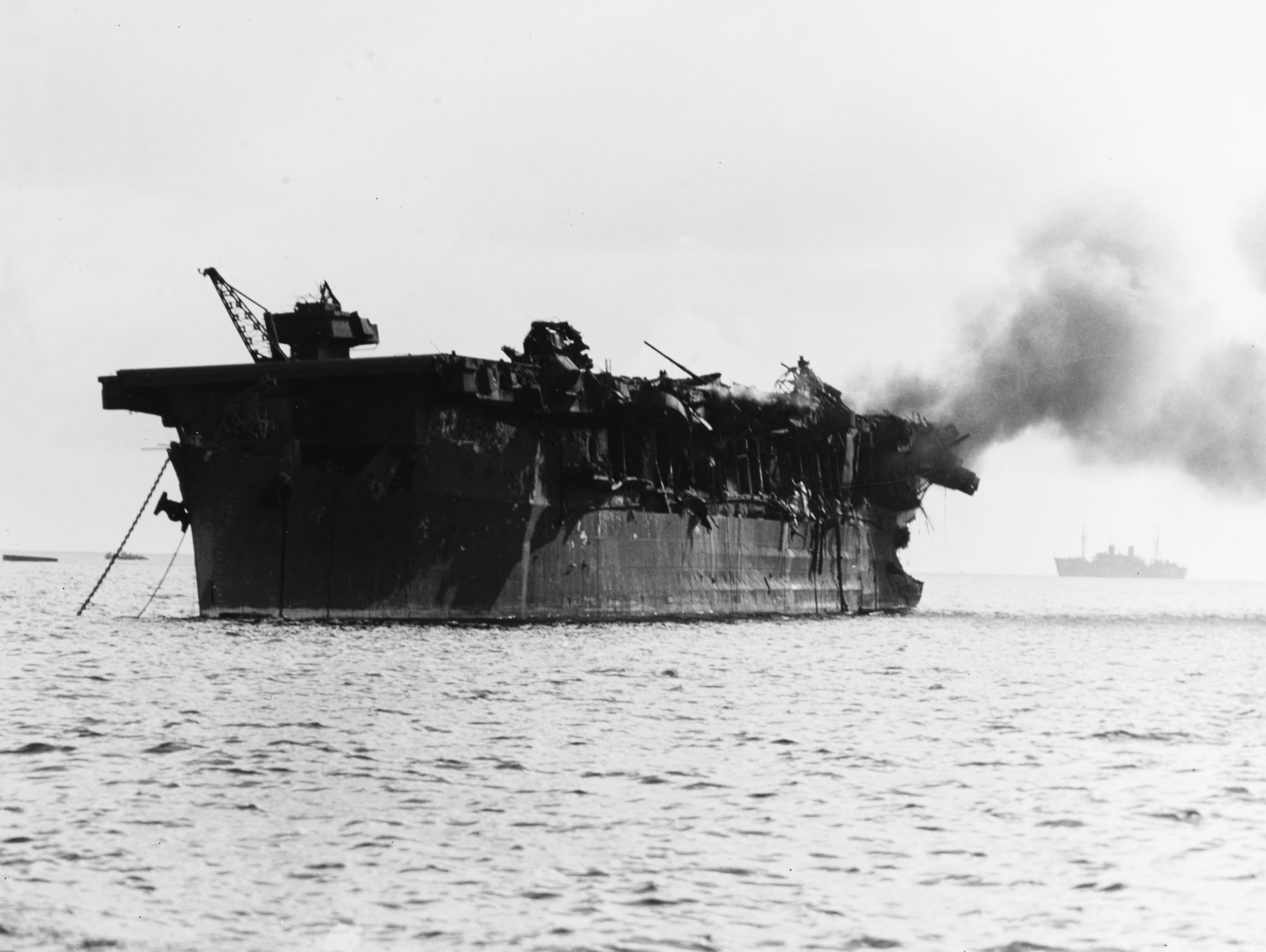
USS Independence on fire aft following the Operation Crossroads shot Able atomic bomb test, 1 July 1946

Independence joined the Operation Magic Carpet fleet beginning 15 November 1945, transporting veterans back to the United States until arriving at San Francisco once more 28 January 1946. Assigned as a target vessel for the Operation Crossroads atomic bomb tests, she was placed within one half mile of ground zero for the 1 July explosion. The veteran ship did not sink (though her funnels and island were crumpled by the blast), and after taking part in another explosion on 25 July was taken to Kwajalein and decommissioned 28 August 1946.

== Sinking and wreck ==
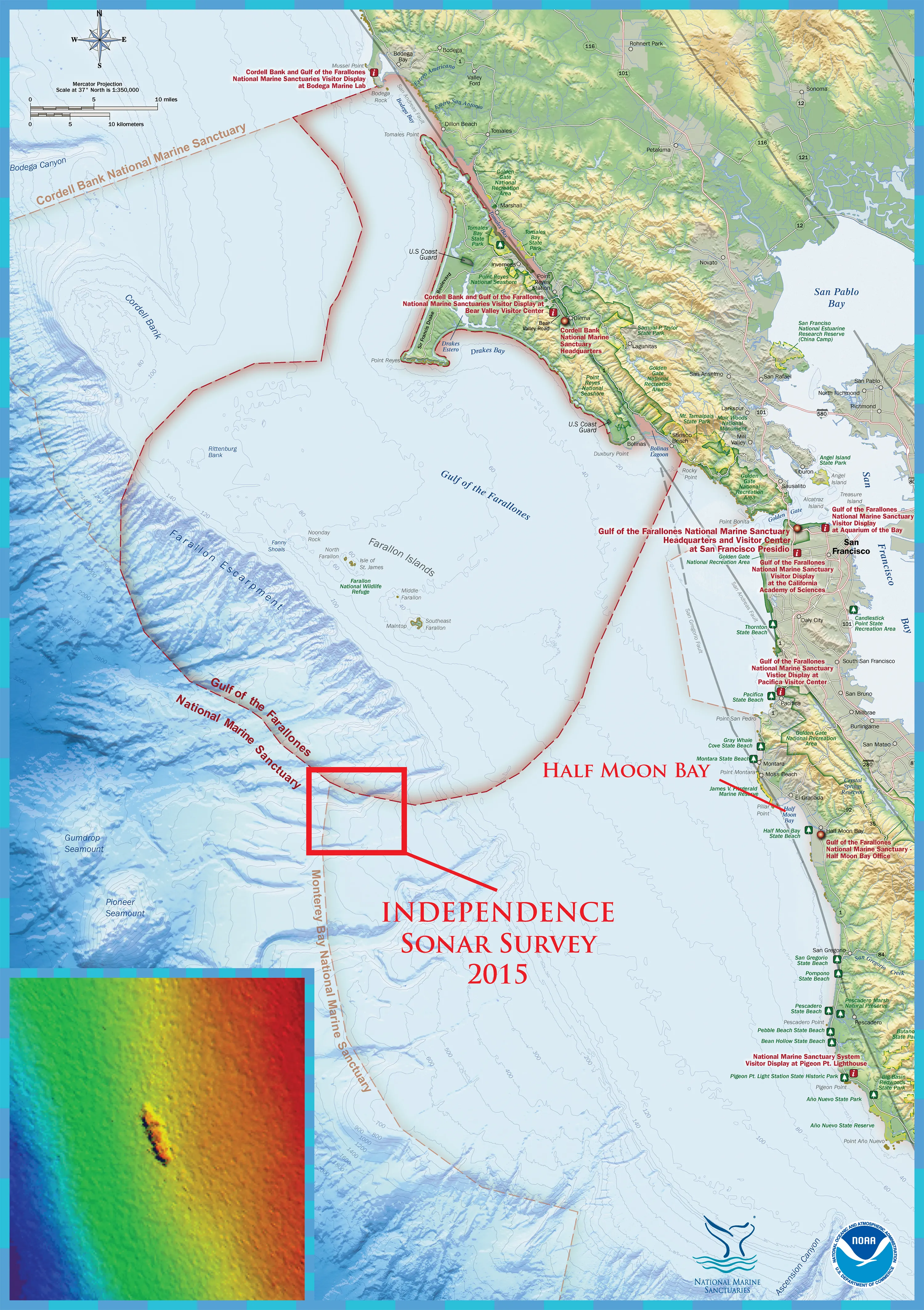
Wreck position

The highly radioactive hull was later moved to Pearl Harbor and then San Francisco for further tests. She was finally scuttled near the Farallon Islands off the coast of California on 29 January 1951, by packing two torpedoes in her hull.

Controversy has subsequently arisen about the sinking of Independence, as it is claimed that she was loaded with barrels of radioactive waste at the time of her sinking, and that the waste has subsequently contaminated the wildlife refuge and commercial fisheries associated with the Farallon Islands. However, in 2015, it was considered that "any public health risk was small", as might be expected after this period of time.

In 2009 the position of the wreck of Independence in 2,600 feet (790 m) of water in the Monterey Bay National Marine Sanctuary off the Farallon Islands at approximately 37°30′00″N 123°05′00″W was confirmed via deep-water multibeam sonar survey conducted from the NOAAS Okeanos Explorer. In March 2015, scientists and technicians of the U.S. National Oceanic and Atmospheric Administration (NOAA) on the sanctuary vessel R/V Fulmar used the autonomous underwater vehicle Echo Ranger to survey the wreck, employing the Echoscope three-dimensional imaging sonar to make a series of images. The ship is resting upright with a slight list to starboard and most of the flight deck intact, although there are gaping holes in the flight deck leading to the hangar deck below. No signs of radioactive contamination were detected, although the barrels of waste are still visible inside the hangar deck, and some have rusted open. A NOAA spokesman described the wreck as "amazingly intact."

In 2016, a mission led by James P. Delgado, deep-sea archaeologist, and partnered with the Ocean Exploration Trust and the National Oceanic and Atmospheric Administration, brought investigators closer to the wreckage than ever before. Using robotic exploration vehicles, the team surveyed the USS Independence for the first time since she sank 65 years prior to the survey, streaming footage online. While investigating the wreckage, researchers found evidence of at least one existing Grumman Hellcat plane as well as the partial remains of an SB2C-4 Helldiver and 40-millimeter and 20-millimeter anti-aircraft weaponry.

== Honors and awards ==
Independence received eight battle stars for World War II service.
