= SeaPerch =

Remotely operated underwater vehicle educational program

SeaPerch is an educational tool and kit that allows elementary, middle, and high-school students to construct a simple, remotely operated underwater vehicle, or Remotely Operated Vehicle (ROV), from polyvinyl chloride (PVC) pipe and other readily made materials. The SeaPerch program is a curriculum designed program that teaches students basic skills in ship and submarine design and encourages students to explore naval architecture and marine and ocean engineering concepts. It was inspired by the 1997 book, Build Your Own Underwater Robot and other Wet Projects, by Harry Bohm and Vickie Jensen. The Massachusetts Institute of Technology Sea Grant (MITSG) College Program created the SeaPerch initiative in 2003, and it is sponsored by the Office of Naval Research, as part of the National Naval Responsibility for Naval Engineering (NNRNE) to find the next generation of Naval Architects, Marine Engineers, Naval Engineers, and Ocean Engineers.

== Goal ==
The Goal of SeaPerch is to build and sustain a long-term effort to address the problem of decreasing college enrollments in engineering and technical programs by introducing elementary, middle, and high school students to science and engineering through hands-on activities.

== History ==
The SeaPerch Remotely Operated Vehicle (ROV) educational program was inspired by the 1997 book, Build Your Own Underwater Robot and other Wet Projects, by Harry Bohm and Vickie Jensen.

=== MIT ===
In 1997, Dr. Tom Consi introduced SeaPerch to the Ocean Engineering program at Massachusetts Institute of Technology (MIT), in order to interest more students in majoring in Ocean Engineering. Realizing the potential of SeaPerch to reach younger students, the MIT Sea Grant (MITSG) College Program created the SeaPerch initiative in 2003, sponsored by the Office of Naval Research. The individuals responsible for the MIT Sea Grant were Dr. Chryssostomos Chryssostomidis, MITSG Director, and Brandy Wilbur, Educational Coordinator.

=== SNAME ===
In late 2007, the Office of Naval Research (ONR) tasked the Society of Naval Architects and Marine Engineers (SNAME) to research ways to expand and enhance the SeaPerch initiative as part of the ONR National Naval Responsibility for Naval Engineering Outreach effort.

== Teaching SeaPerch ==
SeaPerch provides free teacher training to a school district or region, training the teachers and sharing additional classroom usage ideas. Continuing education and/or Professional credits may be offered, as educators are often required to attend workshops throughout the year.

=== Curriculum ===
Teachers are provided with an established curriculum that was designed to meet many of the national learning standards identified by the government. With one project, many with one project, schools are able to teach many of the concepts required for their grade level: an efficient use of time, and a fun, hands-on activity for students. Some of the concepts the students learn during the build include:

SeaPerch Learning Concepts
Ship and sub design
Buoyancy/Displacement
Propulsion
Soldering/tool safety
Vectors
Circuits and switches
Ergonomics
Depth measurement
Biological sampling
Attenuation of light
Moment arm, basic physics of motion

In addition to the curriculum which promotes naval and marine engineering, and naval architects, the SeaPerch program also focuses on presenting the possibilities of technical careers to minorities and girls – underrepresented populations.

== SeaPerch Challenges ==
At the completion of the SeaPerch construction, students are encouraged to test their vehicles, deploy them on “missions”, and compete in culminating event, the SeaPerch Challenge. The SeaPerch Challenge is a one-day district-wide competition in which students are given the opportunity to take what they have learned throughout the curriculum to the next level. The challenge fosters an end goal, rewards sportsmanship, spirit and design skills, as well as mastery of the concepts. Events at the challenge can include:

SeaPerch Challenge Events
Vehicle Performance- Maneuvering and Recovery
Innovative Design – Optional
Team Presentations – Oral Presentations to Judges
Design Notebooks – Document planning, design, construction, testing and learning
Team Spirit and Sportsmanship – At the event

The first SeaPerch event that took place was the Prince William County Public Schools SeaPerch ROV competition day, which attracted more 150 students forming 42 teams from nine schools, at April 26, 2008 held at George Mason University Fairfax campus (Va.). This was reportedly the first-ever sub-sea robotic competition in the state of Virginia.

== Stakeholder Conference ==
The first annual SeaPerch Stakeholders Conference was held August 4–6, 2009 in Honolulu, Hawaii. The Office of Naval Research, in cooperation with The Society of Naval Architects and Marine Engineers hosted the inaugural event to bring those interested in the underwater robotics program together to exchange ideas and information and to network.

== Statistics ==
SeaPerch has provided over 4,000 students with the opportunity to learn about underwater robotics by building a SeaPerch. Since 2009, over 230 teachers have been trained, and will be taking SeaPerch to their classrooms in upcoming semesters. Within the 2009 calendar year, close to 900 SeaPerch kits have been built and shipped to schools and educators across the country. Currently, 118 schools in eight states are participating across the United States in Alaska, Hawaii, Washington, Georgia, Pennsylvania, Maryland, Connecticut and Virginia.

== See also ==
- PantheROV
