= University of Wisconsin–Milwaukee School of Freshwater Sciences =

School of Freshwater Sciences
- Type: Public
- Dean: Rebecca Klaper
- Location: Milwaukee, Wisconsin, United States
- Campus: University of Wisconsin–Milwaukee
- Website: https://uwm.edu/freshwater
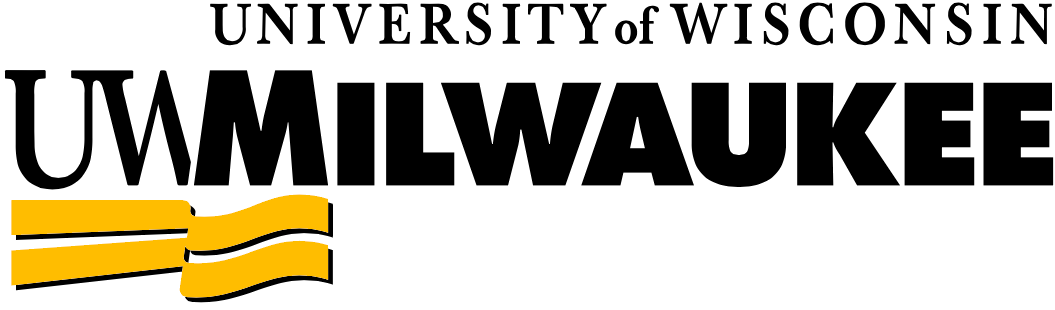

University of Wisconsin–Milwaukee School of Freshwater Sciences (SFS) is an academic division of the University of Wisconsin–Milwaukee focusing on freshwater research and graduate education.

Located at the edge of the Great Lakes, SFS is the only graduate school of freshwater science in the U.S. and the third in the world. It offers Doctor of Philosophy (Ph.D.) and Master of Science (M.S.) of Freshwater Sciences in Freshwater System Dynamics, Human and Ecosystem Health, Freshwater Technology and Freshwater Economics, Policy and Management. Beginning in 2021, it began offering Bachelor's of Science in Freshwater Sciences, focusing on aquatic science or water policy.

The school was built upon the Great Lakes WATER Institute, a freshwater research institution of the University of Wisconsin System administered by the Graduate School of University of Wisconsin–Milwaukee.

== Research centers ==
- Great Lakes Genomics Center
- Analytical Core Laboratory
- Great Lakes Aquaculture Research
- Center for Water Policy
- Public Engagement & Science Communication (PESC)
- The Water Technology Accelerator (WaTA)
- Water Equipment and Policy Center
