= RoboSub =

Underwater robotic vehicle competition sponsored by the US Navy

RoboSub is a competition whose goal is to advance the development of autonomous underwater vehicles (AUVs) by challenging a new generation of engineers to perform realistic missions in an underwater environment. It was launched in 1997 and is co-sponsored by the RoboNation (formerly the AUVSI Foundation) and the Office of Naval Research (ONR). The event also serves to foster ties between young engineers and the organizations developing AUV technologies. The competition is open to high school and college teams from around the world. Since about 2002, it has been held each summer at the U.S. Navy Space and Naval Warfare Systems Center Pacific's TRANSDEC Anechoic pool in San Diego, California. In 2022, the competition took place at the University of Maryland, College Park.

== Winners by year ==
There were no live competition winners in 2021 as the competition was held online. Instead, competitors were judged on submitted videos, reports, and website.

| Year | 1st place | 2nd place | 3rd place |
|---|---|---|---|
| 2025 | National University of Singapore | The Ohio State University | McGill University |
| 2024 | Si Se Puede Foundation | The Ohio State University | Cornell University |
| 2023 | National University of Singapore | BRAC University | University of Alberta |
| 2022 | National University of Singapore | Amador Valley High School | Carnegie Mellon University |
| 2021 | n/a | n/a | n/a |
| 2020 | Team Inspiration | Si Se Puede Foundation & Arizona State University | Tecnológico de Monterrey |
| 2019 | Harbin Engineering University | Far Eastern Federal University / Institute for Marine Technology Problems | Arizona State University Polytechnic |
| 2018 | Harbin Engineering University | National University of Singapore | École de Technologie Supérieure / California Institute of Technology (shared) |
| 2017 | Cornell University | Far Eastern Federal University | National University of Singapore |
| 2016 | California Institute of Technology | Indian Institute of Technology, Bombay | Cornell University |
| 2015 | San Diego State University | National University of Singapore | Maritime State University |
| 2014 | Cornell University | University of Florida | École de Technologie Supérieure |
| 2013 | Cornell University | University of Florida | Far Eastern Federal University |
| 2012 | Cornell University | University of Florida | École de Technologie Supérieure |
| 2011 | École de Technologie Supérieure | Cornell University | University of Florida |
| 2010 | Cornell University | U.S. Naval Academy | University of Maryland |
| 2009 | Cornell University | University of Victoria | University of Rhode Island |
| 2008 | University of Maryland | University of Texas at Dallas | École de Technologie Supérieure |
| 2007 | University of Florida | University of Rhode Island | École de Technologie Supérieure |
| 2006 | University of Florida | Duke University | École de Technologie Supérieure |
| 2005 | University of Florida | École de Technologie Supérieure | Massachusetts Institute of Technology |
| 2004 | Massachusetts Institute of Technology | Cornell University | École de Technologie Supérieure |
| 2003 | Cornell University | École de Technologie Supérieure | Duke University |
| 2002 | Massachusetts Institute of Technology | Cornell University | University of Florida |
| 2001 | Massachusetts Institute of Technology | Amador Valley High School | University of Florida |
| 2000 | University of Rhode Island | Cornell University and Massachusetts Institute of Technology (tie) | U.S. Naval Academy |
| 1999 | Massachusetts Institute of Technology | University of Florida | Florida Atlantic University |
| 1998 | Massachusetts Institute of Technology | Stevens Institute of Technology | University of Florida |

== Detailed competition history ==
=== 1998 ===
1. MIT
2. Stevens Institute of Technology
3. University of Florida
4. Johns Hopkins University

=== 1999 ===
1. MIT
2. University of Florida
3. Florida Atlantic University
- Honorable Mention: U.S. Naval Academy
- Honorable Mention: Stevens Institute of Technology

=== 2000 ===
1. University of Rhode Island
2. (tie) Cornell University and MIT
3. US Naval Academy
4. University of W. Florida
5. Cal Poly San Luis Obispo
6. Amador Valley High School
7. University of Florida
8. Stevens Inst. of Technology
9. Florida Atlantic University
10. University of Colorado - Denver
11. Ecole de Technologie Superieure (Montreal)

=== 2001 ===
1. MIT
2. Amador Valley High School
3. University of Florida
4. University of Rhode Island
5. Cornell University
6. University of Colorado at Denver
7. Duke/North Carolina State Universities
8. Florida Atlantic University
9. U.S. Naval Academy
10. Monta Vista High School
11. Ecole de Technologie Superieure
12. Stevens Institute of Technology
- Good Neighbor Award: University of Colorado-Denver
- Bang for the Buck Award: Monta Vista High School
- Best New Entry: Duke and N.C. State Universities

=== 2002 ===
1. MIT
2. Cornell University
3. University of Florida
4. Duke
5. Amador Valley High School
6. University of Rhode Island
7. Ecole de technologie superieure
8. Florida Atlantic University
9. Team Tortuga
10. U.S. Naval Academy
11. Saratoga and Monta Vista High Schools
12. University of Victoria
13. University of West Florida
14. University of Colorado - Denver
15. DeVry—Calgary

=== 2003 ===
1. Cornell University
2. Ecole de technologie superieure (Montreal)
3. Duke
4. MIT
5. Amador Valley High School
6. University of Rhode Island
7. Hammerhead AUV Fellowship
8. University of Florida
9. University of Colorado - Denver
10. University of Victoria
11. University of West Florida
12. Virginia Tech

=== 2004 ===
1. Massachusetts Institute of Technology
2. Cornell University
3. Ecole de technologie superieure
4. University of Rhode Island
5. Duke University
6. University of Ottawa
7. University of Florida
8. Amador Valley High School
9. University of Texas at Dallas
10. University of Victoria
11. Virginia Tech
12. Pacific Northwest AUV Fellowship
13. San Diego State University
14. University of Colorado at Denver
15. University of Central Florida
16. Southern Polytechnic State University
17. Brigham Young University - Hawaii
18. University Southern California
- Best Newcomer: University of Ottawa
- Lightest Entry: Brigham Young University - Hawaii
- Most Innovative: Duke University

=== 2005 ===
1. University of Florida
2. Ecole de Technologie Superieure
3. MIT
4. Duke University
5. Amador Valley High School
6. University of Rhode Island
7. University of Southern California
8. Cornell University
9. University of Colorado at Denver
10. Southern Polytechnic State University
11. University of Texas at Dallas
12. Georgia Tech - Marine Robotics Society
13. University of Central Florida
14. Virginia Tech
15. University of Ottawa
16. University of Victoria
17. DeVry
18. North Carolina State University
19. Indian Underwater Robotics Society
- No Guts No Glory: Ecole de Technologie Superieure
- Docking Dollars: Duke University
- Best New Entry: Georgia Tech - Marine Robotics Society

=== 2006 ===
1. University of Florida
2. Duke University
3. Ecole de technologie superieure
4. University of Rhode Island
5. University of Texas at Dallas
6. Massachusetts Institute of Technology
7. Cornell University
8. University of Central Florida
9. North Carolina State University
10. Southern Polytechnic State University
11. University of Toronto
12. Virginia Tech
13. University of Ottawa
14. University of Victoria
15. Amador Valley High School
16. Georgia Tech
17. San Diego City College
18. University of Colorado Denver
19. University of Southern California
20. Kyushu Institute of Technology
21. Indian Underwater Robotics Society
- Best New Entry - University of Toronto
- Best New Design - University of Central Florida

=== 2007 ===
1. University of Florida, USA
2. University of Rhode Island, Dept. of Ocean Engineering, USA
3. École de Technologie Supérieure, CANADA
4. Cornell University, USA
5. University of Central Florida, USA
6. University of Southern California, USA
7. United States Naval Academy, USA
8. Southern Polytechnic State University, USA
9. Pacific Nautilus San Diego City College, USA
10. University of Maryland, USA
11. Southern Methodist University, USA
12. Smurphs Pair, Home School, USA
13. Amador Valley High School Robotics Club, USA
14. University of Colorado at Denver, USA
15. NW AUV Fellowship, USA
16. University of Victoria, CANADA
17. Virginia Tech AUVT, USA
18. University of Ottawa, CANADA
19. Duke University, USA
20. University of Texas at Dallas, USA
21. Delhi College of Engineering, INDIA
22. Georgia Tech, USA
23. San Diego iBotics AUV, USA
24. University of Toronto, CANADA
25. MIT, USA
26. North Carolina State University, USA
27. Kyushu Institute of Technology, JAPAN

=== 2008 ===
1. University of Maryland
2. University of Texas at Dallas
3. École de technologie supérieure
4. University of Florida
5. United States Naval Academy
6. University of Victoria
7. Cornell University
8. Florida Atlantic University
9. Delhi College of Engineering
10. San Diego City College
11. San Diego iBotics
12. University of Ottawa
13. Amador Valley High School
14. Southern Methodist University
15. University of Southern California
16. Georgia Tech
17. University of Alberta ARVP
18. University of Colorado at Boulder
19. Kyushu Institute of Technology
20. Universite Laval
21. Southern Polytechnic State University
22. University of West Florida
23. University of Wisconsin
24. North Carolina State University
25. Norwich University

=== 2009 ===
1. Cornell University ($10K)
2. University of Victoria ($4K)
3. University of Rhode Island ($3K)
4. UCF
5. U Texas @ Dallas
6. USC
7. FAU
8. U Maryland
9. Kyushu Institute of Tech
10. ETS
11. Amador
12. iBotics
13. US Naval Academy
14. Delhi College of Engineering
15. SDCR
16. NC State U
17. Saint George's
18. VT
19. U Toronto MDA
20. U Florida
21. ARVP
22. MIT
23. SPSU
24. Embry Riddle
25. KAIST
26. UWF
27. U Ottawa
28. Pacific Nautilus
29. U Colorado @ Denver
30. McGill U
- Best New Team: St. Georges ($1000)
- Most with the Least: Florida Atlantic University ($500)
- Best technical paper: Kyushu ($500)
- TSA Award: Embry Riddle ($500) (vehicle was significantly damaged in shipping by the TSA)

=== 2010 ===
1. Cornell ($6,000 Prize)
2. U.S. Naval Academy ($5,000)
3. University of Maryland ($2,250)
4. ETS ($1,750)
5. Amador Valley High School ($1,000)
6. University of Texas at Dallas ($1,000)
7. Kyushu Institute of Technology ($1,000)
- University of Central Florida: Second Chance Award ($,1000)
- San Diego City College: Best Group Presentation ($500)
- Reykjavik University: Determination Award ($500)

=== 2011 ===
1. ETS Team SONIA (awarded $7,500)
2. Cornell University (awarded $3,000)
3. University of Florida (awarded $2,500)
4. University of Maryland ($1,500)
5. University of Victoria ($1,000)
6. University of Texas at Dallas ($1,000)
7. Florida Atlantic University ($500)
8. University of Central Florida ($500)
9. University of Rhode Island ($500)

=== 2012 ===
1. Cornell University ($7,000)
2. University of Maryland ($5,000)
3. University of Florida ($3,000)
4. ETS ($2,000)
5. Georgia Tech ($1,000)
6. Purdue University ($1,000)
7. University of Texas at Dallas ($1,000)
8. University of Victoria ($1,000)
9. Florida Atlantic University ($500)
10. RoboNation ($500)

=== 2013 ===
1. Cornell University
2. Georgia Tech
3. University of Florida
4. University of Maryland
5. University of Rhode Island
6. Purdue University
7. University of Texas at Dallas
8. ETS
9. University of Victoria
10. University of Arizona

=== 2014 ===
1. Cornell University
2. Georgia Tech
3. University of Florida
4. University of Maryland
5. Purdue University
6. University of Alberta
7. ETS
8. University of Arizona
9. University of Victoria
10. Florida Atlantic University

=== 2015 ===
Final Standings

1st Place ($6,000): San Diego State University

2nd Place ($4,000): National University of Singapore

3rd Place ($3,000): Maritime State University

4th Place ($1,000): California Institute of Technology

5th Place ($1,000): University of Arizona

6th Place ($1,000): Far Eastern Federal University

7th Place ($1,000): Amador Valley High School

Judges Awards

Innovation on a Budget ($500): San Diego Robotics 101

Innovation on a Budget ($500): Southern Polytechnic State University

No Guts No Glory ($500): Carl Hayden High School

Pay it Forward ($500): Montana State University

Best Performance ($500): Amador Valley High School

Best Marketing Integration ($500): McGill University

=== 2016 ===
1. Cornell University
2. University of Florida
3. University of Alberta
4. Georgia Tech
5. Purdue University
6. ETS
7. University of Maryland
8. University of Victoria
9. California Institute of Technology

=== 2017 ===
1. Cornell University
2. University of Florida
3. University of Alberta
4. ETS
5. Purdue University
6. Georgia Tech
7. University of Rhode Island
8. University of Maryland
9. University of Victoria
10. Embry-Riddle Aeronautical University

=== 2018 ===
1. Cornell University
2. University of Florida
3. University of Alberta
4. Purdue University
5. ETS
6. Georgia Tech
7. University of Maryland
8. University of Rhode Island
9. University of Victoria
10. Embry-Riddle Aeronautical University

=== 2019 ===
1. Cornell University
2. University of Florida
3. University of Alberta
4. Purdue University
5. ETS
6. Georgia Tech
7. University of Maryland
8. University of Rhode Island
9. University of Victoria
10. Embry-Riddle Aeronautical University

=== 2020 ===
1. Cornell University
2. University of Florida
3. University of Alberta
4. Purdue University
5. ETS
6. Georgia Tech
7. University of Maryland
8. University of Rhode Island
9. University of Victoria
10. Embry-Riddle Aeronautical University

=== 2021 ===
1. Cornell University
2. University of Florida
3. University of Alberta
4. Purdue University
5. ETS
6. Georgia Tech
7. University of Maryland
8. University of Rhode Island
9. University of Victoria
10. Embry-Riddle Aeronautical University

=== 2022 ===
1. Cornell University
2. University of Florida
3. University of Alberta
4. Purdue University
5. ETS
6. Georgia Tech
7. University of Maryland
8. University of Rhode Island
9. University of Victoria
10. Embry-Riddle Aeronautical University
