= Great Lakes WATER Institute =

Freshwater research center of the University of Wisconsin System

Great Lakes WATER Institute (also known as the WATER Institute, Wisconsin Aquatic Technology and Environmental Research Institute, GLWI) is a freshwater research center of the University of Wisconsin System administered by the Graduate School of University of Wisconsin–Milwaukee.

Located on Milwaukee's inner harbor, it is the only major aquatic research institution located on Lake Michigan and the largest of its kind in the Great Lakes region.

The WATER Institute is both a UW-Milwaukee Center of Excellence and a UW System Regents Center of Excellence. It became the main component of UW-Milwaukee School of Freshwater Sciences in 2009 with the goal of turning Milwaukee into a world freshwater research hub.

== Fleet and facilities ==
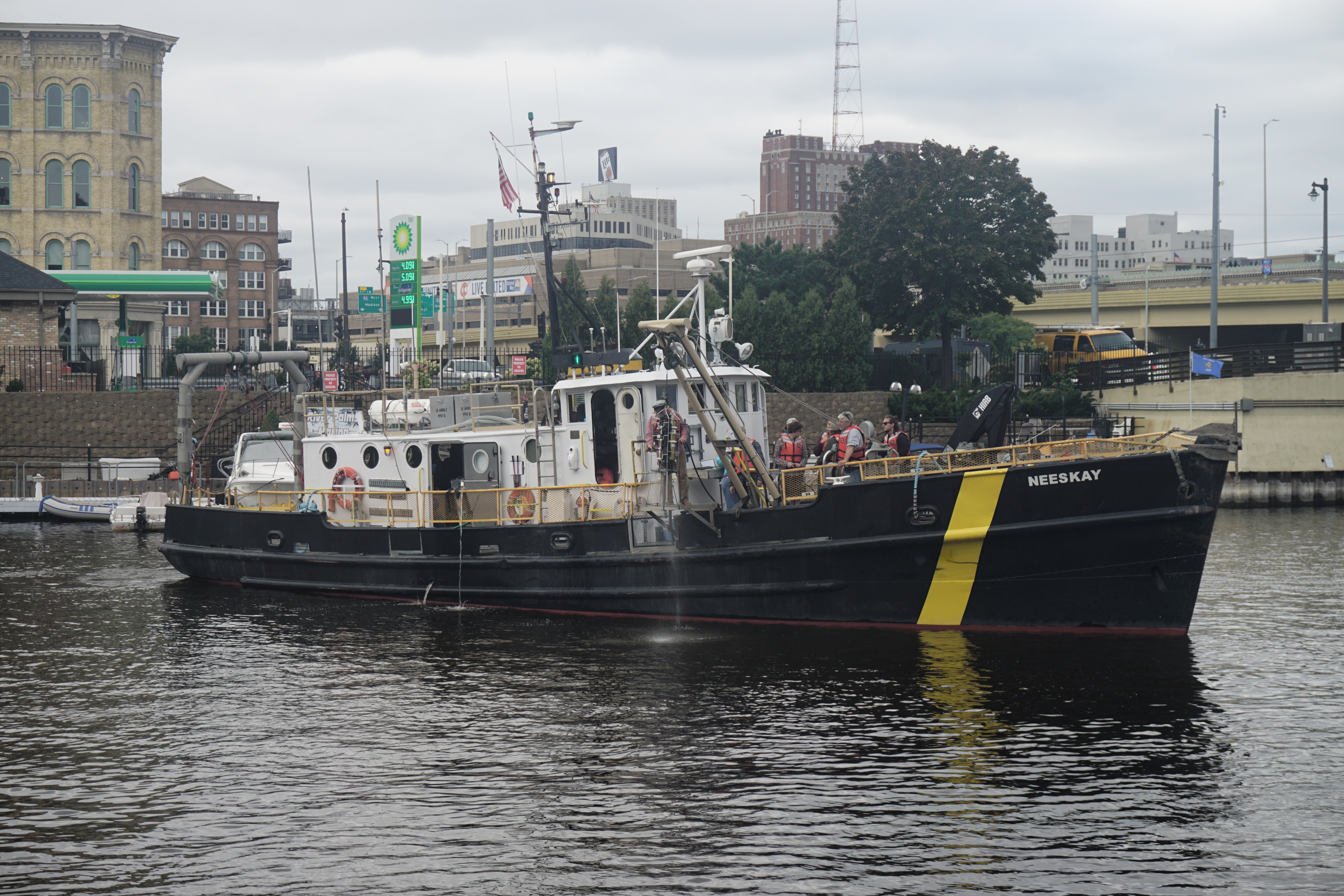
The research vessel Neeskay

Neeskay, whose name was derived from the Ho-Chunk language, is the Institute's main research vessel. In addition to Neeskay, the institute also has a fleet of small boats.

The WATER Institute also houses aquatic holding tanks for aquaculture and an instrumentation shop capable of making custom-made instruments.

== Institutions ==
The WATER Institute hosts UWM Center for Great Lakes Studies, NIEHS Marine and Freshwater Biomedical Sciences Center, University of Wisconsin Aquaculture and Fisheries Research Center, University of Wisconsin Sea Grant Institute, Advisory Services Milwaukee Field Office and Wisconsin DNR Southern Lake Michigan Fisheries Management, and Law Enforcement Units. The WATER Institute is also home to the GLUCOS buoy sensor network and the ROV Team at UWMs PantheROV.

=== GLUCOS ===
The Great Lakes Urban Coastal Observing System (GLUCOS) is a buoy-based sensor network that will support research on the interactions between Milwaukee Harbor and the lake, and other processes in coastal Lake Michigan.

The GLUCOS is composed of two types of buoys; Endurance Buoys which are large seasonal buoys and Pioneer Buoys which are small relatively easy to deploy buoys. The Pioneer Buoys are spar buoys anchored to the bottom, with custom electronics attached to the mooring lines monitoring data from sondes, temperature sensor strings, and other sensors as needed for research purposes.

=== PantheROV ===
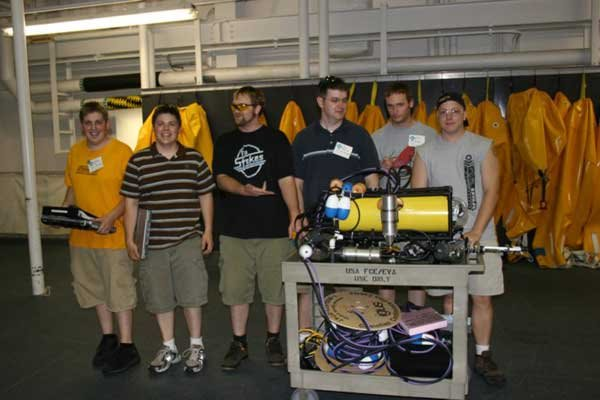
ROV Team about to compete with the PantheROV II

PantheROV is the name of the remotely operated vehicle (ROV) built by undergraduate students at the University of Wisconsin–Milwaukee (UWM) for the annual MATE ROV Competition, essentially an underwater robotics competition. PantheROV is a conjugation of UWMs mascot, the panther, and ROV. The ROV Team at UWM is supported by the Great Lakes WATER Institute and various other sponsors. The team is open to all undergraduate students at UWM. Many of the students on the ROV Team have worked concurrently at the GLWI and have provided large engineering contributions to the Great Lakes Urban Coastal Observing System (GLUCOS).

== See also ==
- Great Lakes
- Great Lakes Areas of Concern
