= Edokko-1 =

Japanese unmanned submersible

Edokko-1 (江戸っ子1号 Edokko Ichigo) is a Japanese small-sized unmanned submersible developed by Edokko-1 Project Committee in 2013. On November 22, 2013, the submersible dove to a depth of 7,800 meters in the Japan Trench and captured images of deep-sea fish using a 3D full hi-vision video camera. The Edokko-1 Project Committee consists of five small- and medium-sized firms based in Tokyo and Chiba prefectures. The submersible was developed jointly by the committee and a consortium of support organizations (including universities, research labs, private firms and volunteers).

== Development ==
The concept of Edokko Ichigo originates from Yukio Sugino, the president of Sugino Rubber Chemical, Ltd., who was eager to start a new project in Tokyo to develop a device that can “reach deep-sea.” He was inspired by the successful launch of the “Maido Ichigo” satellite by East Osaka Craftsmen Astro-Technology SOHLA in Osaka. Although he initially planned to develop a probe that could dive to 11,000 meters, the plan turned out to be unfeasible. JAMSTEC (Japan Agency for Marine-Earth Science and Technology) advised, at the request of President Sugino, that he could develop a probe using commercially available glass balls which free-falls to a depth of about 8,000 meters and returns to the surface by jettisoning a ballast weight. This advice constituted the basis for the Edokko Ichigo submersible. After the basic concept was formulated, the member firms of the Project Committee launched the development of constituent components. The members of the consortium, including the professors and students of universities and private companies, also contributed significantly to the development of control computers and telecommunication components. The Tokyo Higashi Shinkin Bank served as the secretariat for the project.

== Milestones ==
- May 2009 – Yukio Sugino, the president of Sugino Rubber Chemical, drew up the first proposal and brought it to The Tokyo Higashi Shinkin Bank for consultation
- February 2010 – JAMSTEC advised Sugino that he could develop “free-fall submersible glass balls equipped with a video camera”
- January 2011 – The project officially launched
- April 2011 – Edokko-1 Project Committee organized (4 core firms and 4 support organizations)
- August 2011 – Engineers from Sony Corporation volunteered to participate in the project
- September 2011 – Selected as one of the projects for JAMSTEC's Special Program to Enhance the Utilization of Projects by Start-up Ventures
- January 2012 – A joint research agreement signed
- March 2012 – High-pressure / underwater operation test at JAMSTEC
- June 2012 – Video recording / operation test at Enoshima Aquarium
- October 2012 – Dive test completed successfully in Sagami Bay (to a depth of 50 meters)
- February 2013 – okamoto glass co., Ltd. joined the Project Committee
- June 2013 – Deepwater images captured successfully with a 3D full hi-vision video camera during the dive test in Sagami Bay
- July 2013 – A submersible and a control module of new specifications built for an upcoming dive test in the Japan Trench
- August 2013 – Dive test completed successfully in Sagami Bay (to a depth of 500 meters)
- November 2013 – Ultra-deepwater dive test completed successfully in the Japan Trench (to a depth of 7,800 meters)

== Features ==
- Small-sized (easy to operate)
- Low-cost
- Fully autonomous (without cable)
- Wireless communication between glass balls using rubber
- Video recording using 3D full hi-vision cameras

== Structure ==
Edokko Ichigo consists of four glass balls, a frame, a fish bait bar and a ballast weight. The glass balls consist of a communication ball, a transponder ball, a lighting ball and a video recording ball, which are connected vertically in a descending order. Each ball, housed in a protective plastic enclosure, can withstand deep-sea pressures. Among the four glass balls, only the communication ball is connected to the frame via a rope. The other balls are fixed on the 1.5-meter-long metal frame. The fish bait bar and the ballast weight are fixed on the bottom of the frame.

== Equipped devices ==
A GPS receiver, a satellite phone, a transponder, an LED module, a commercially available 3D Handycam (Sony), a controlling computer, a range of sensors, batteries, a weight-release device and a ballast weight.

== Missions ==
- Dive 1 meter per second by its own weight and the ballast weight after being released from a mother vessel
- Reach the depth of 7,800 meters in about 2 hours
- On the seafloor, the fish bait bar automatically unfolds diagonally downward beside the frame
- Lighting and 3D video recording are turned on/off by timer
- The submersible returns to the surface by jettisoning its ballast weight upon receiving an acoustic command signal from the mother vessel
- After surfacing, the submersible measures its location with GPS and signals the location to the mother vessel via the satellite phone (Iridium)

== Video recording functions ==
The submersible is equipped with a commercially available full high-vision 3D handycam (Sony HDR-TD20V) that is capable of continuous recording for up to nearly 10 hours using an external battery.

== Development / Operating structure ==
=== Edokko-1 project committee ===
- Sugino Rubber Chemical, Ltd.
- HAMANO PRODUCTS. Co. Ltd
- Pearl Giken Co., Ltd
- Tsukumo Electronics Corp.
- Okamoto glass co., Ltd.

=== Support organizations ===
- Japan Agency for Marine-Earth Science and Technology (JAMSTEC)
- Shibaura Institute of Technology
- Tokyo University of Marine Science and Technology
- The Tokyo Higashi Shinkin Bank

== Technical Support Organizations include ==
- Enoshima Aquarium
- Volunteer engineers from Sony Corporation
- Numata Koki Ltd.
- Vacuum Mold Co., Ltd.

=== Sponsors ===
- S.I. Tech
- The Tokyo Higashi Shinkin Bank
- Higashin Business Club AURORA
- Higashin Academy Lapin

=== Equipment Sponsor ===
- Sony Corporation

== Ultra-deepwater dive test at a depth of 7,800 meters in Japan Trench (November 21 – 24, 2013) ==
The submersible and the members of the Edokko-1 Project left the port of Yokosuka aboard “Kaiyo,” a survey ship owned by JAMSTEC, for the Japan Trench off the coast of Boso Peninsula. A total of three submersibles were released; two were dropped to 7,800 meters and one was dropped to about 4,000 meters. Each of them was raised successfully after 3D full hi-vision recording of deep-sea fish for 5 to 30 hours. Gammaridean and Pseudoliparis belyaevi were filmed at the depth of 7,800 meters, while Macrouridae and Spectrunculus grandis were filmed at the depth of 4,000 meters. This is the first time in history that the images of deep-sea fish at these depths were captured using a 3D video camera. The pictures, taken from diagonally above, show the clear images of fish moving around the submersible.
