= Echo Ranger =

Marine autonomous underwater vehicle built by Boeing

Class overview
- Name: Echo Ranger
- Builders: Boeing Defense, Space & Security (BDS)
- Operators: Boeing
- Preceded by: ORISIS
- Built: 2001
- In commission: September 30, 2004
- Completed: 1
- Active: 1

General characteristics Echo Ranger
- Type: Autonomous underwater vehicle
- Displacement: 5,308 kilograms (11,702 lb))
- Length: 5.5 m (18 ft)
- Beam: 1.27 m (4 ft 2 in)
- Height: 1.27 m (4 ft 2 in)
- Propulsion: Thrusters
- Speed: 8 knots (15 km/h) maximum; 3 to 6 knots (5.6 to 11.1 km/h) normal operating speed
- Endurance: 28 hours (can be configured for 30-day missions)
- Test depth: 3,050 m (10,010 ft)

Echo Ranger is a marine autonomous underwater vehicle (AUV) built by Boeing.

Originally built in 2001 to capture high-resolution sonar images of sea beds for oil and natural gas companies, such as the Exxon Mobil Corporation, Echo Ranger underwent testing for possible use by the military. Among its possible military uses are to stalk targets in enemy waters, patrol local harbors to detect national security threats, and scour ocean floors to detect environmental hazards. The submersible weighs more than five tons (4.5 metric tons), is 18.5 feet (5.6 meters) long and is able to descend to 10,000 feet (3,000 meters).

== See also ==
- Echo Voyager, a successor Boeing AUV

== Sources ==
- Hennigan, W., J., "Boeing tests submarine drone off Santa Catalina Island," Los Angeles Times, August 19, 2001.
- auvac.org AUV System Spec Sheet: Echo Ranger platform
- boeing.com Echo Ranger
