= List of minesweepers of the Royal Netherlands Navy =

This page is a list of all past and present minesweepers of the Royal Netherlands Navy, including shallow water, coastal and oceangoing minesweepers of the Mine Service. Auxiliary minesweepers which have aided the Royal Netherlands Navy are not included.

== M class ==
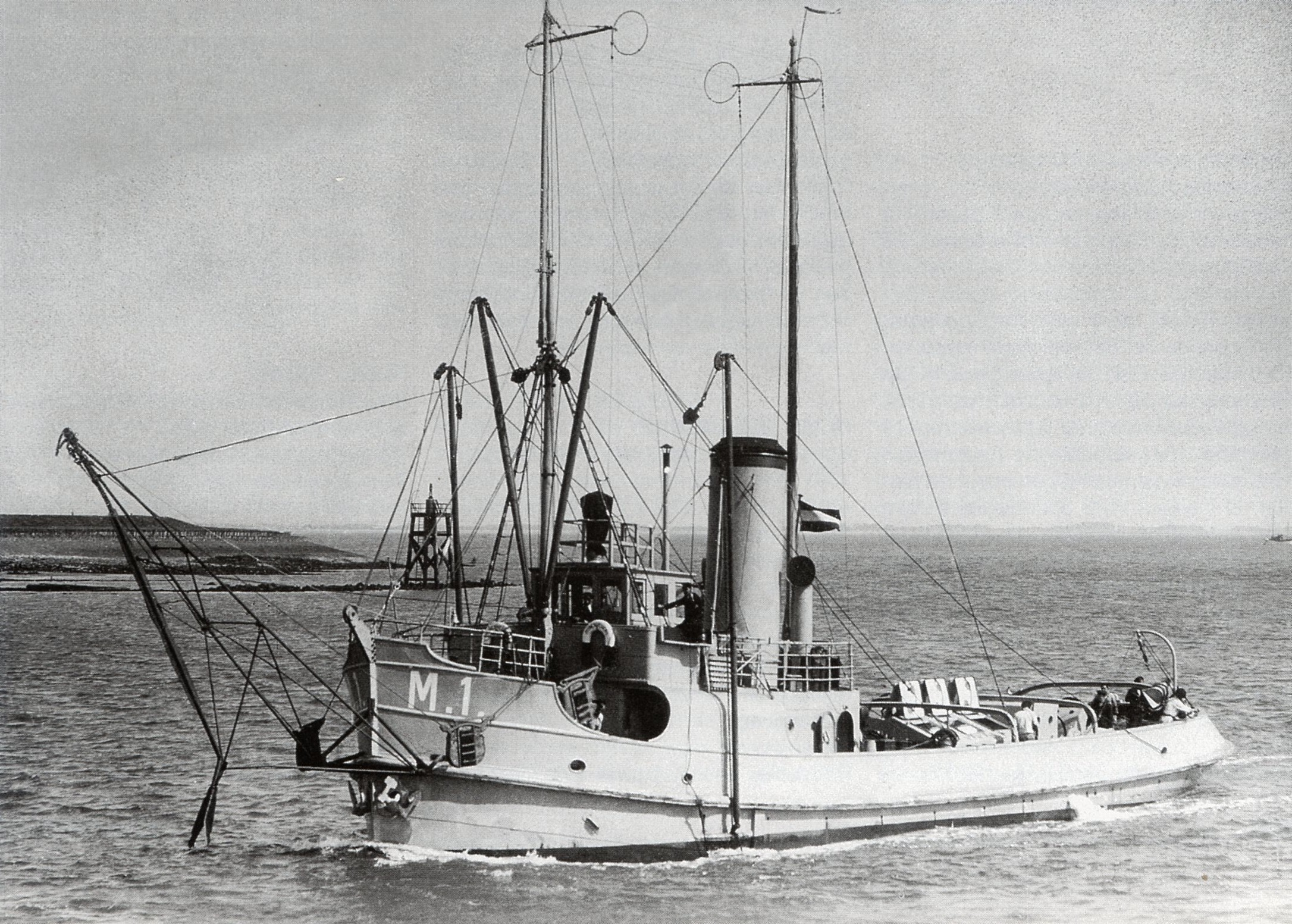
HNLMS M1

- HNLMS M 1 (1918 - 1949)
- HNLMS M 2 (1918 - 1940)
- HNLMS M 3 (1918 - 1940)
- HNLMS M 4 (1918 - 1992)

== A class ==
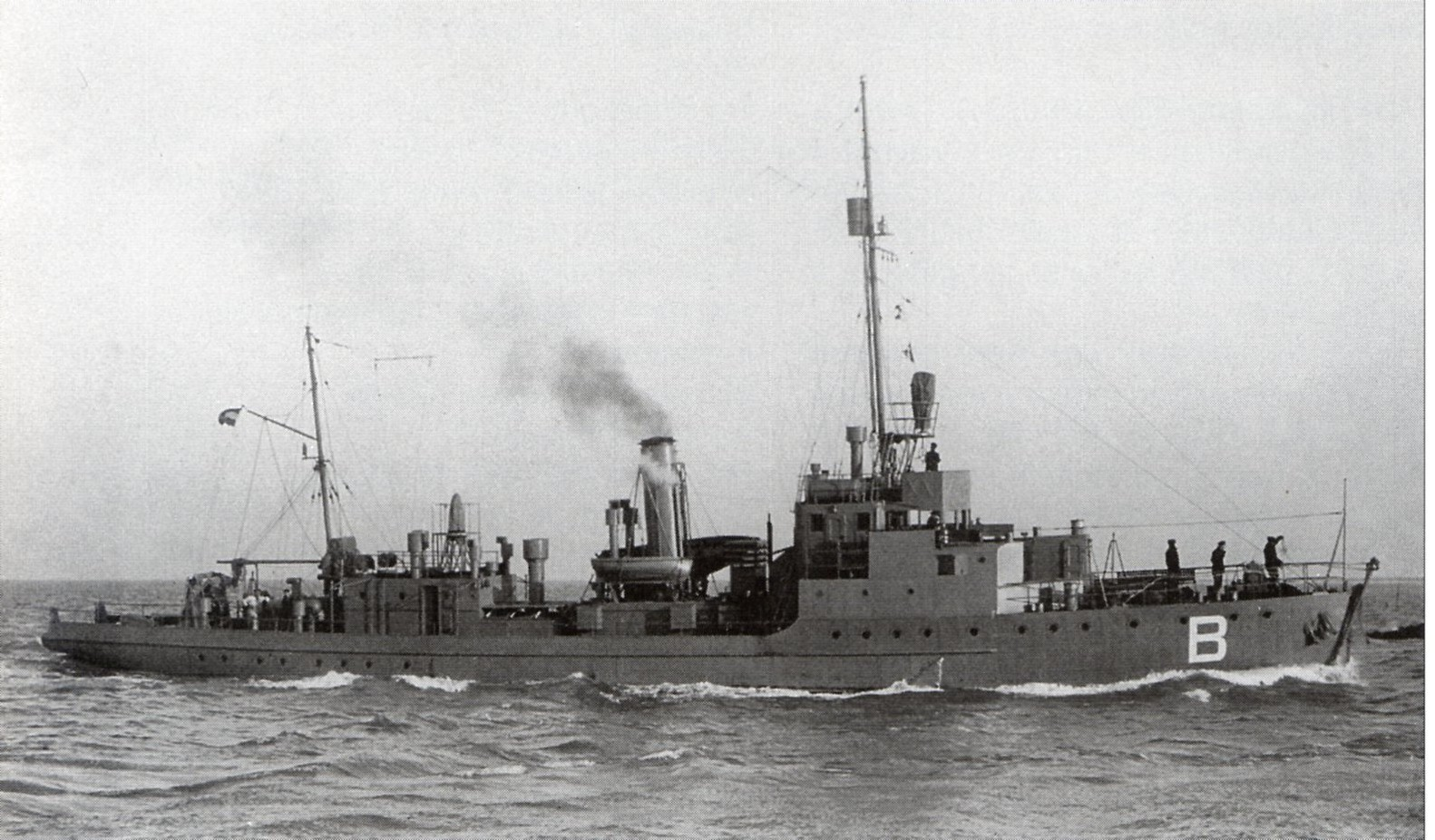
HNLMS B

- HNLMS A (1930 - 1942) (1943 - 1945 in Japanese service)
- HNLMS B (1930 - 1942) (1942 - 1945 in Japanese service)
- HNLMS C (1930 - 1942) (1943 - 1944 in Japanese service)
- HNLMS D (1930 - 1942)

== Jan van Amstel class ==
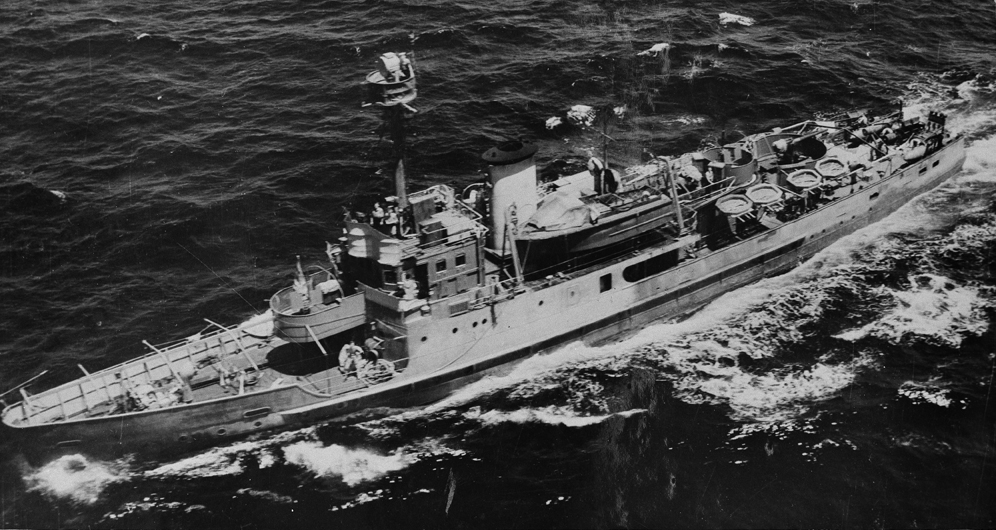
Abraham Crijnssen in service with the RAN

- HNLMS Jan van Amstel (1937 - 1942)
- HNLMS Pieter de Bitter (1937 - 1942)
- HNLMS Abraham Crijnssen (1937 - 1961)
- HNLMS Eland Dubois (1937 - 1942)
- HNLMS Willem van Ewijck (1937 - 1939)
- HNLMS Pieter Florisz (1937 - 1962) (1940 - 1945 in German service)
- HNLMS Jan van Gelder (1937 - 1961)
- HNLMS Abraham van der Hulst (1937 - 1940) (1940 - 1945 in German service)
- HNLMS Abraham van der Hulst (1946 - 1961) (1940 - 1945 in German service)

== MMS class ==
=== 105 feet ===
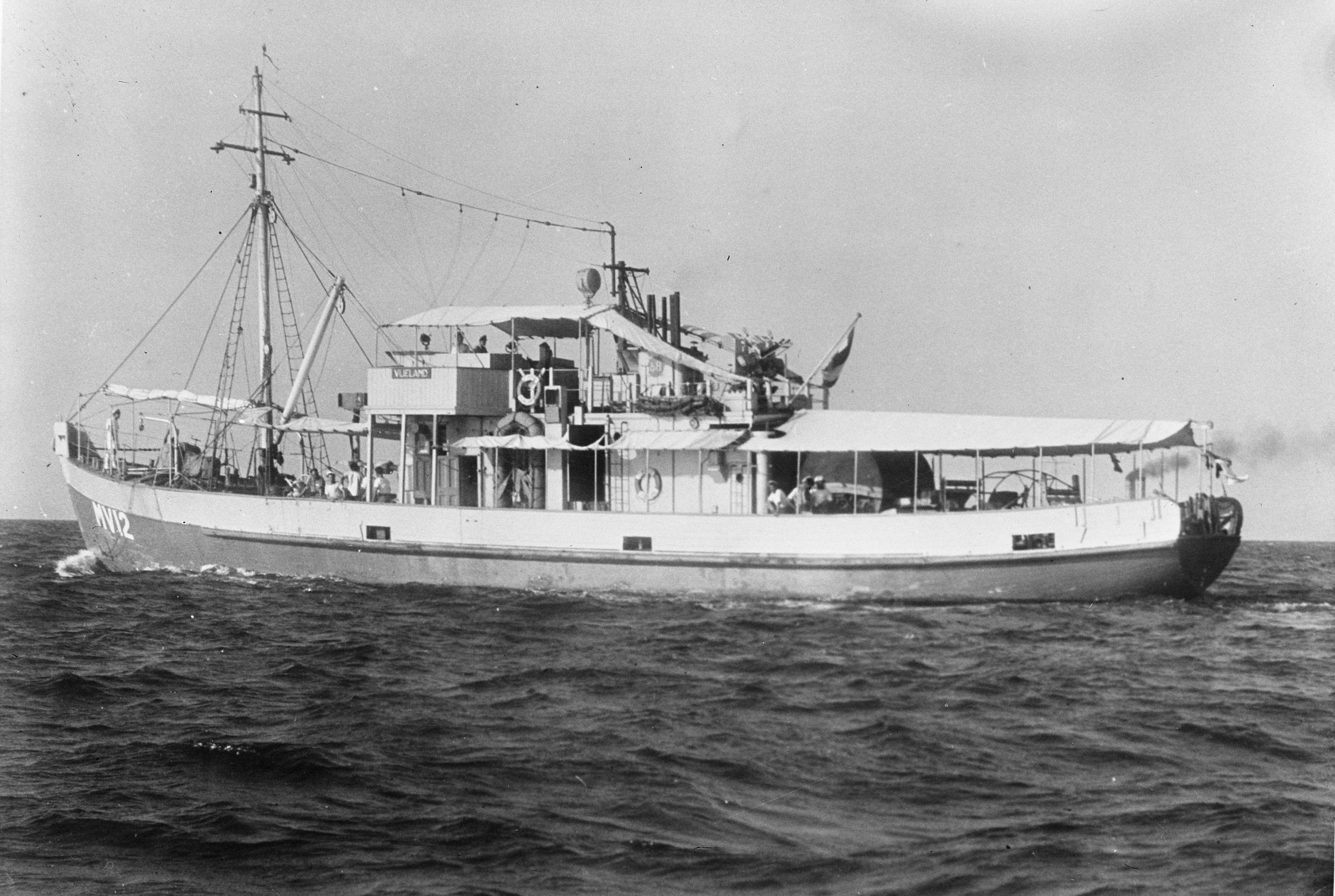
HNLMS Vlieland

- HNLMS Ameland (1942 - 1957)
- HNLMS Beveland (1942 - 1957)
- Hr. Ms. Marken (1942 - 1944)
- Hr. Ms. Marken (1944 - 1957)
- HNLMS Putten (1942 - 1957)
- HNLMS Rozenburg (1942 - 1957)
- Hr. Ms. Terschelling (1942 - 1942)
- Hr. Ms. Terschelling (1943 - 1957)
- Hr. Ms. Texel (1942 - 1957)
- HNLMS Vlieland (1942 - 1952)

=== 126 feet ===
- HNLMS Duiveland (1943 - 1952)
- HNLMS Overflakkee (1944 - 1954)
- HNLMS Schokland (1944 - 1949)
- HNLMS Tholen (1943 - 1952)
- HNLMS Voorne (1943 - 1952)
- HNLMS Walcheren (1943 - 1946)
- HNLMS Wieringen (1943 - 1949)
- HNLMS IJsselmonde (1943 - 1952)

== Batjan class ==
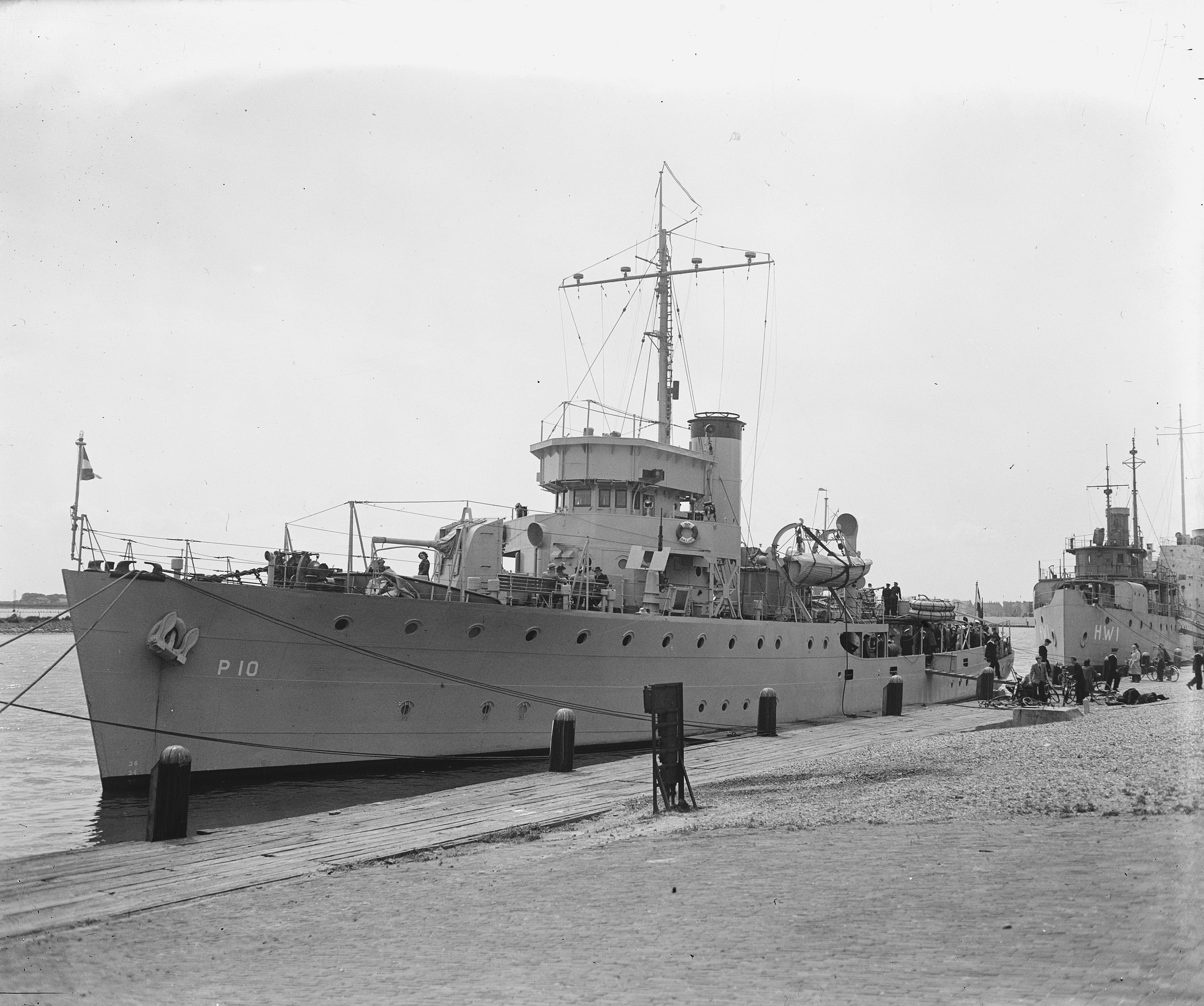
HNLMS Batjan

- HNLMS Ambon (1946 - 1950)
- HNLMS Banda (1946 - 1950)
- HNLMS Batjan (1946 - 1958)
- HNLMS Boeroe (1946 -1958)
- HNLMS Ceram (1946 - 1958)
- HNLMS Morotai (1946 - 1949)
- HNLMS Ternate (1946 - ????)
- HNLMS Tidore (1946 - 1949)

== Keeten class ==
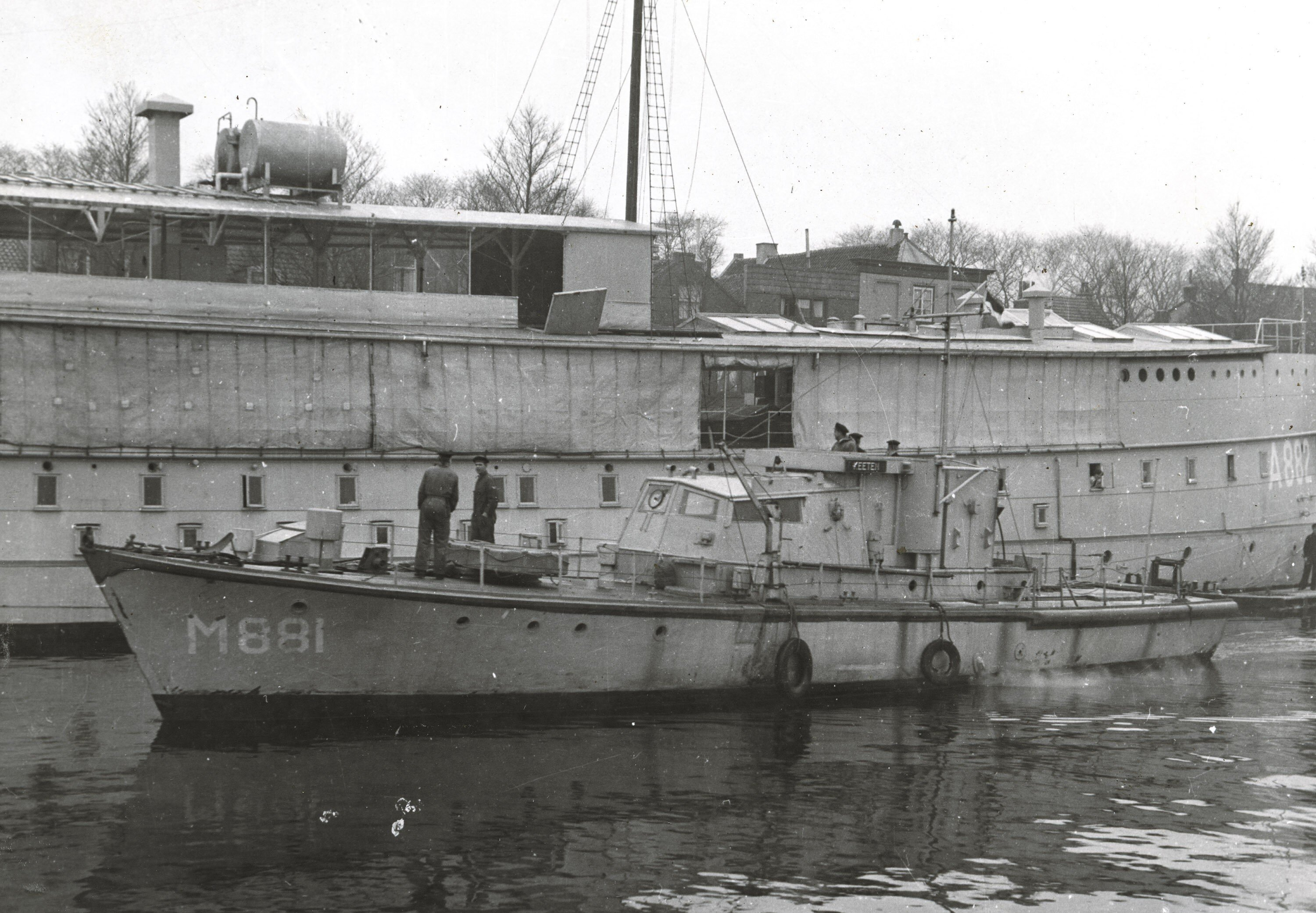
HNLMS Keeten

- HNLMS Keeten (1946 - 1964)
- HNLMS Mastgat (1946 - 1962)
- HNLMS Zijpe (1946 - 1962)

== Borndiep class ==
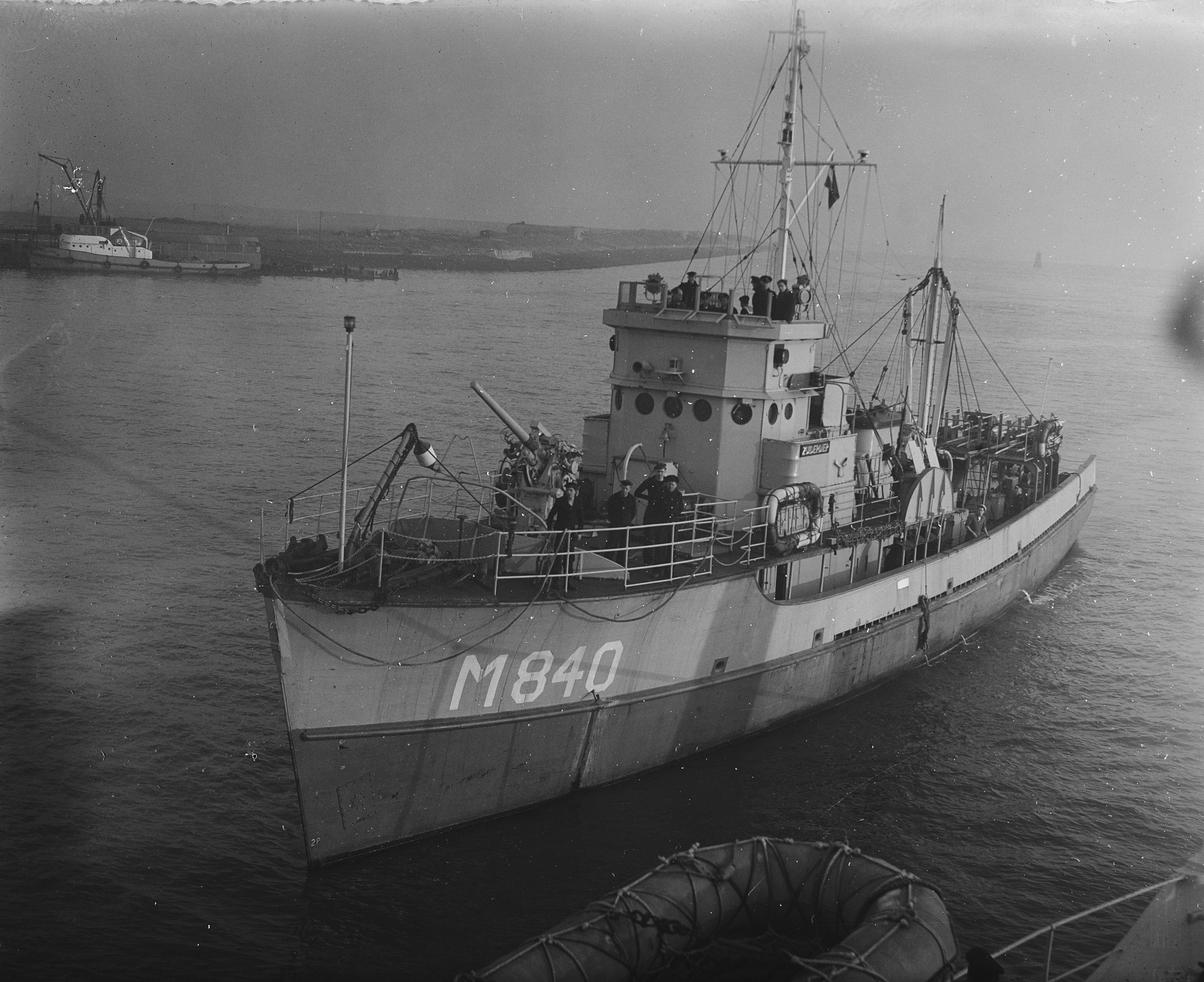
HNLMS Zuiderdiep

- HNLMS Borndiep (1946 - 1962)
- HNLMS Deurloo (1946 - 1962)
- HNLMS Hollandsch Diep (1946 - 1957)
- HNLMS Marsdiep (1947 - 1956)
- HNLMS Oosterschelde (1947 - 1957)
- HNLMS Texelstroom (1947 - 1976)
- HNLMS Vliestroom (1947 - 1962)
- HNLMS Volkerak (1946 - 1957)
- HNLMS Westerschelde (1946 - 1957)
- HNLMS Zuiderdiep (1947 - 1962)

== Goeree class ==
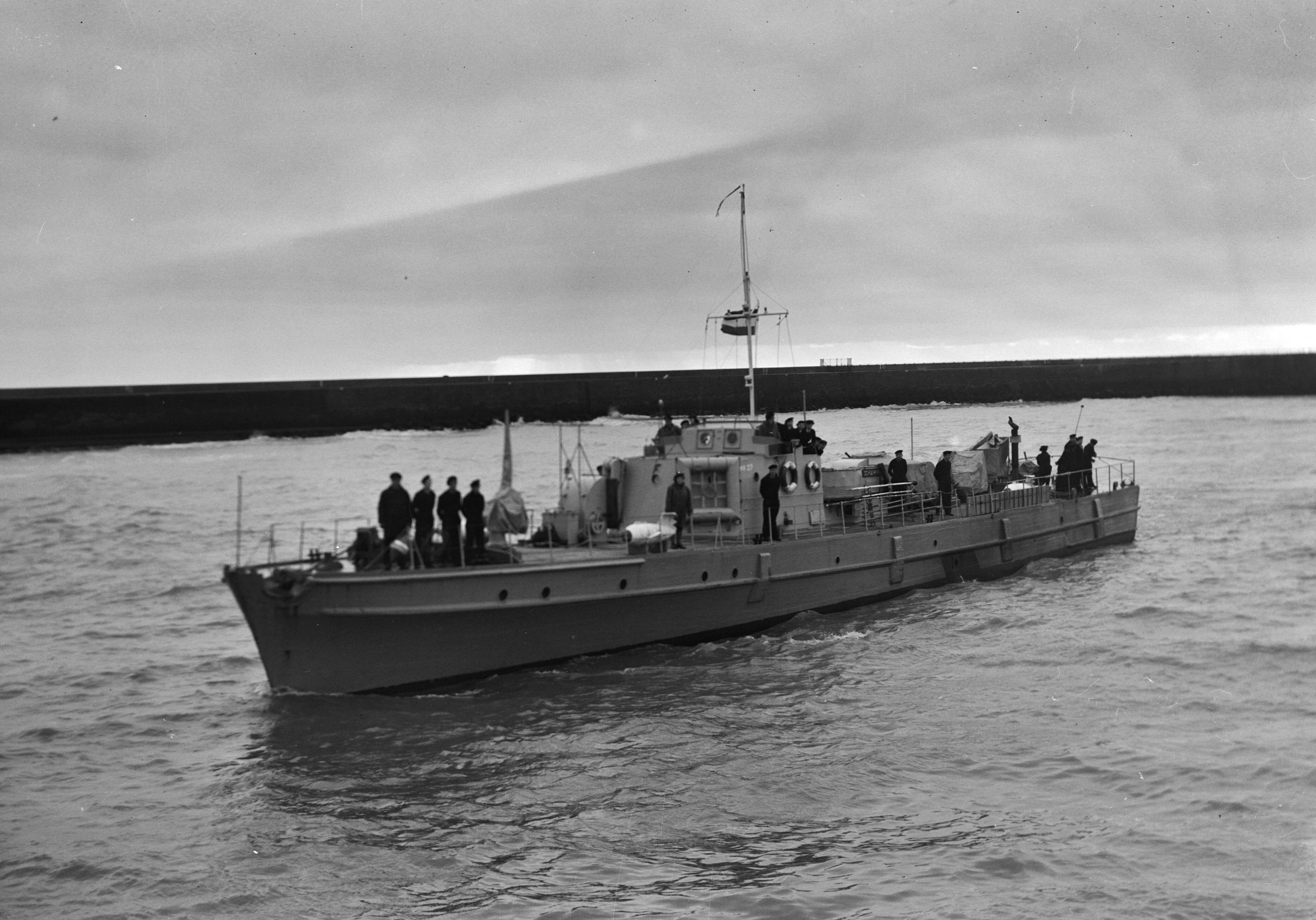
Goeree class

- HNLMS Goeree (1947 - 1956)
- HNLMS Malzwin (1947 - 1956)
- HNLMS Roompot (1947 - 1956)
- HNLMS Schiermonnikoog (1947 - 1956)
- HNLMS Schouwen (1947 - 1956)
- HNLMS Schulpengat (1947 - 1956)
- HNLMS Stortemelk (1947 - 1956)
- HNLMS Urk (1947 - 1956)
- HNLMS Vlieter (1947 - 1956)
- HNLMS Walcheren (1947 - 1956)

== Beemster class ==
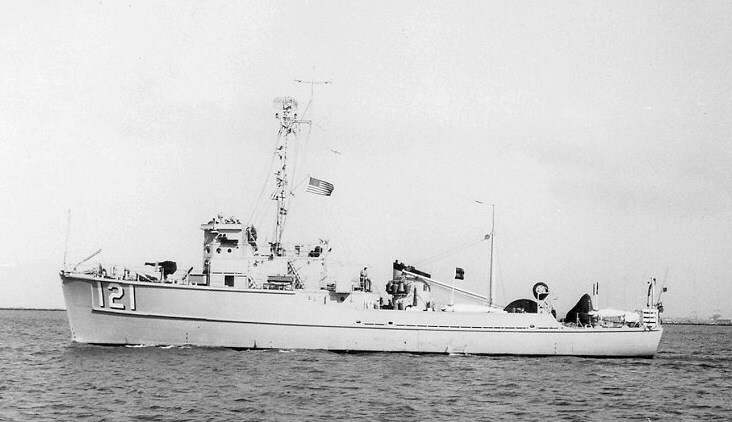
US ship similar to the Beemster class

- HNLMS Bedum (1953 - 1976)
- HNLMS Beemster (1953 - 1974)
- HNLMS Beilen (1954 - 1975)
- HNLMS Blaricum (1954 - 1976)
- HNLMS Bolsward (1953 - 1972)
- HNLMS Borculo (1953 - 1974)
- HNLMS Borne (1953 - 1975)
- HNLMS Boxtel (1954 - 1976)
- HNLMS Breskens (1954 - 1976)
- HNLMS Breukelen (1954 - 1972)
- HNLMS Brielle (1954 - 1975)
- HNLMS Brouwershaven (1954 - 1973)
- HNLMS Bruinisse (1954 - 1972)
- HNLMS Brummen (1954 - 1976)

== Onversaagd class ==
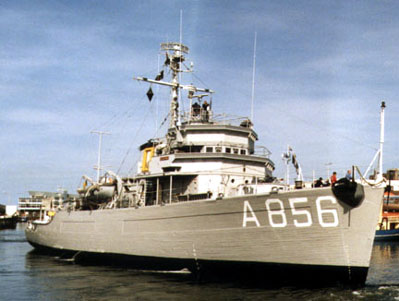
HNLMS Onverschrokken

- HNLMS Onbevreesd (1954 - 1982)
- HNLMS Onverdroten (1954 -1982)
- HNLMS Onvermoeid (1954 -1971)
- HNLMS Onversaagd (1954 - 1976)
- HNLMS Onverschrokken (1954 - 1972)
- HNLMS Onvervaard (1955 - 1982)

== Wildervank class ==
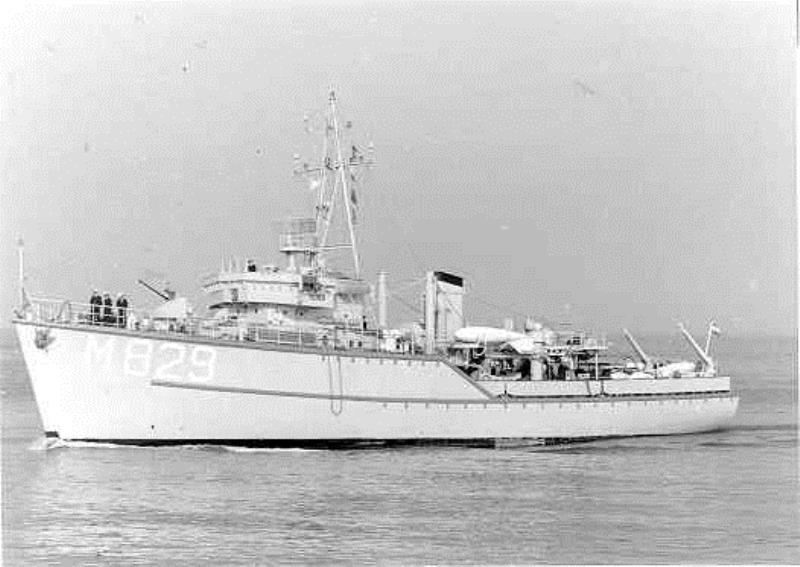
HNLMS Elst

- HNLMS Aalsmeer (1956 - 1974)
- HNLMS Axel (1956 - 1974)
- HNLMS Elst (1956 - 1970)
- HNLMS Gieten (1956 - 1969)
- HNLMS Goes (1956 - 1977)
- HNLMS Grijpskerk (1956 - 1993)
- HNLMS Leersum (1957 - 1977)
- HNLMS Lisse (1957 - 1969)
- HNLMS Lochem (1956 - 1969)
- HNLMS Meppel (1956 - 1977)
- HNLMS Sneek (1957 - 1969)
- HNLMS Steenwijk (1956 - 1969)
- HNLMS Waalwijk(1956 - 1977)
- HNLMS Wildervank (1955 - 1977)

== Dokkum class ==
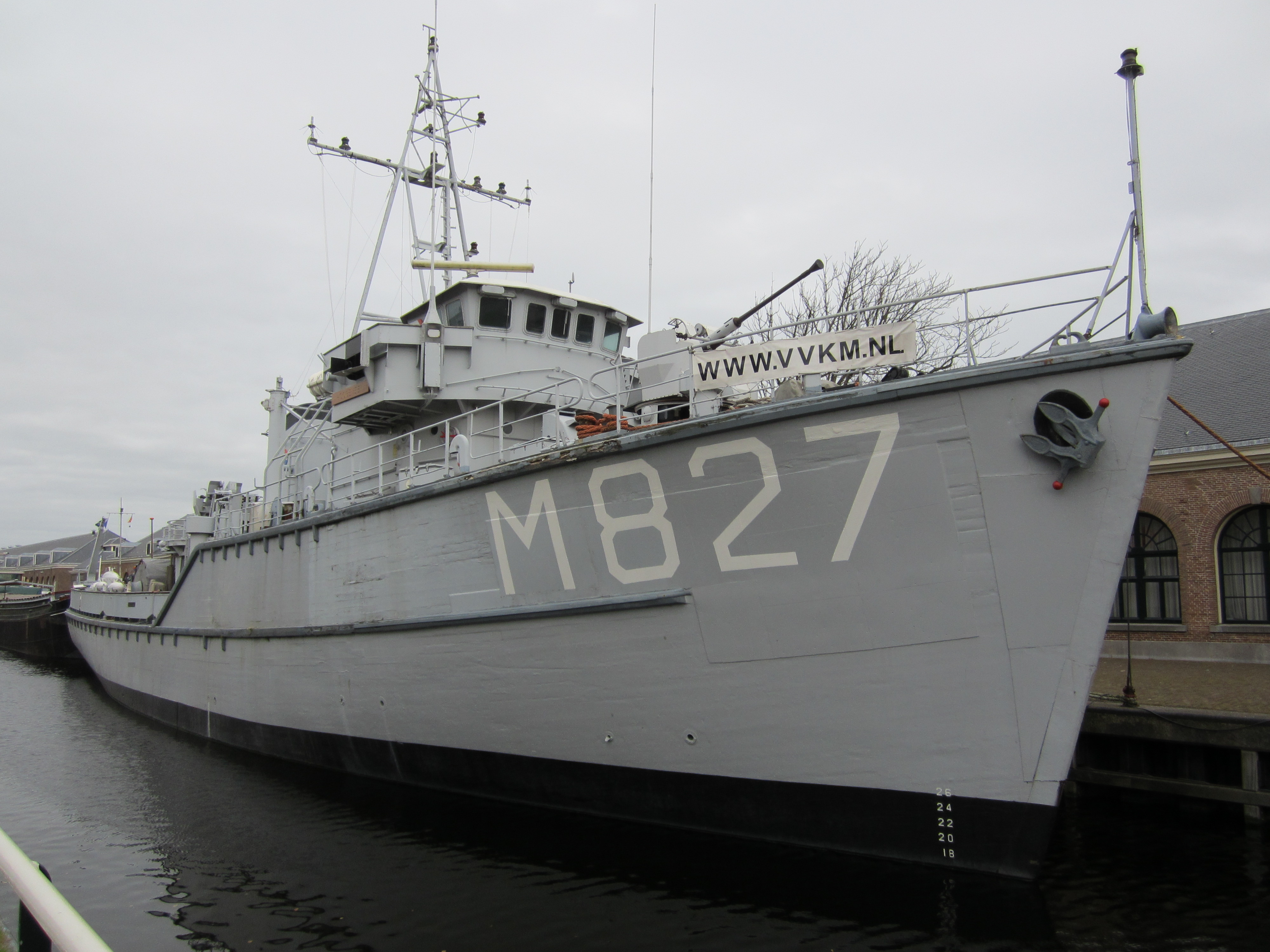
HNLMS Hoogeveen

- HNLMS Abcoude (1956 - 1994)
- HNLMS Dokkum (1955-1985)
- HNLMS Drachten (1956 - 1999)
- HNLMS Drunen (1956 - 1984)
- HNLMS Gemert (1956 - 1993)
- HNLMS Giethoorn (1956 - 1993)
- HNLMS Hoogeveen (1956 - 1999)
- HNLMS Hoogezand (1955 - 1993)
- HNLMS Naaldwijk (1955 - 2000)
- HNLMS Naarden (1956 - 1999)
- HNLMS Ommen (1956 - 1997)
- HNLMS Rhenen (1956 - 1984)
- HNLMS Roermond (1955 - 1995)
- HNLMS Sittard 1956 - 1999)
- HNLMS Staphorst (1957 - 1984)
- HNLMS Veere (1956 - 1984)
- HNLMS Venlo (1956 - 1993)
- HNLMS Woerden (1957 - 1990)

== Van Straelen class ==
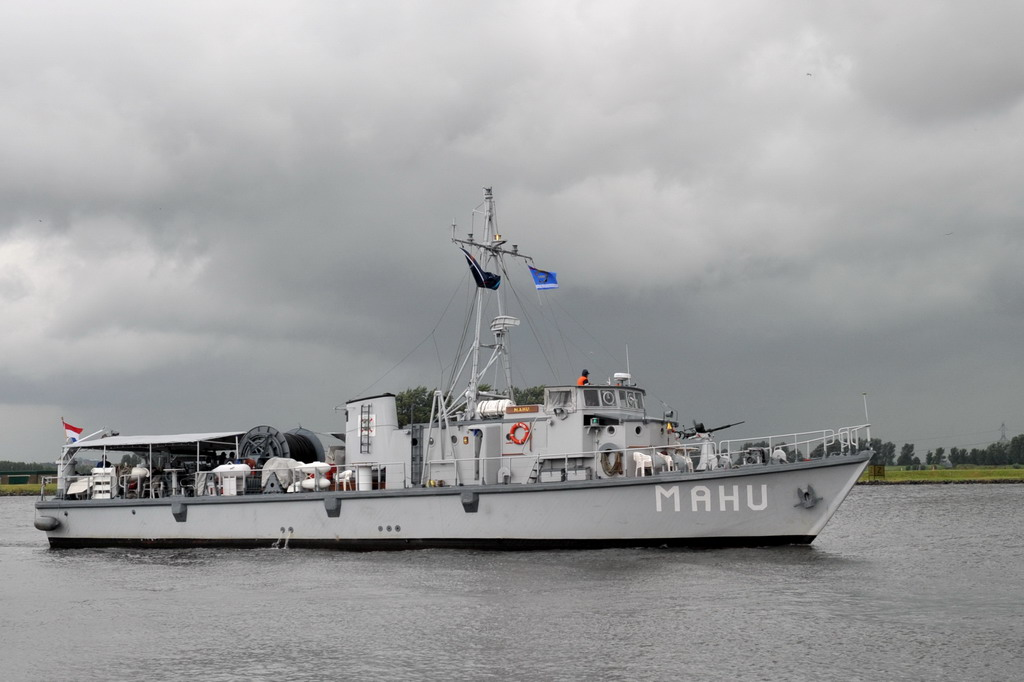
HNLMS Mahu

- HNLMS Alblas (1960 - 1983)
- HNLMS Bussemaker (1960 - 1983)
- HNLMS Chömpff (1960 - 1983)
- HNLMS Houtepen (1962 - 1983)
- HNLMS Lacomblé (1960 - 1983)
- HNLMS Mahu (1961 - 1983)
- HNLMS Schuiling (1961 - 1983)
- HNLMS Staverman (1962 - 1983)
- HNLMS Van der Wel (1961 - 1983)
- HNLMS Van Hamel (1960 - 1983)
- HNLMS Van Moppes (1960 - 1983)
- HNLMS Van Straelen (1960 - 1983)
- HNLMS Van 't Hoff (1961 - 1983)
- HNLMS Van Versendaal (1962 - 1983)
- HNLMS Van Well Groeneveld (1961 - 1983)
- HNLMS Zomer (1961 - 1983)
