= Gusto Shipyard =

Shipbuilding company in the Netherlands

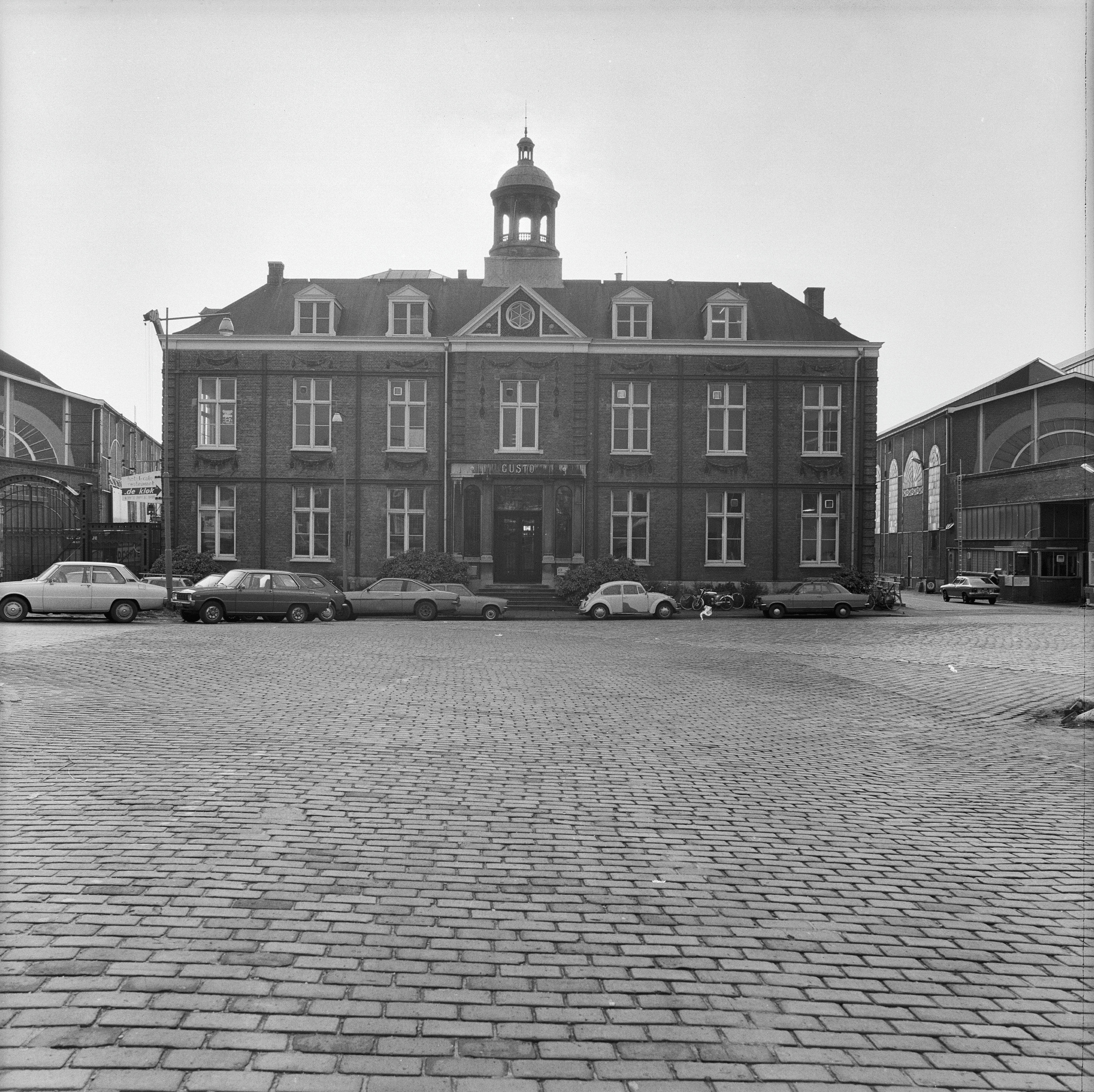
- Façade in Schiedam
- Industry: Ship building
- Founded: 1905
- Founders: Henri en Frans Smulders
- Defunct: 1978
- Headquarters: Schiedam, Netherlands
- Website: werf-gusto.com

Gusto Shipyard, previously A.F. Smulders, was a shipbuilding company in Schiedam, Netherlands. It was famous for dredging and offshore vessels. In 1978 it was closed down under suspicious circumstances. Its engineering office still exists as GustoMSC, a subsidiary of American oil rig and equipment manufacturer NOV Inc.

== Predecessors ==
In 1862 A.F. (Guust) Smulders (1838-1908) from Tilburg, founded a small machine factory in 's-Hertogenbosch. It soon expanded with an iron foundry (1863-1864) and a shipyard (1865). Guust also had a tow service and rented out machinery. In 1867 Guust's younger brother Charles (1842-1900) joined the company. By 1872 they had become so successful that they bought Utrechtsche IJzergieterij & Machinefabriek (Utrecht iron foundry and machine factory) for 60,000 guilders. The factory then became known as 'Utrechtsche IJzergieterij & Machinefabriek, Firma A.F. Smulders'. An important product in Utrecht was the production of machinery to produce margarine.

In Utrecht heavy equipment was the main product. Production had started in 1873. After 1880 the activity became very successful because of the international activities of Dutch contractors. In 1885 contractor J.C. van Hattum ordered 10 bucket chain excavators for the construction of the Panama Canal. In 1889 the factory had 323 employees, making it a very big company at the time. It was the first Dutch company to introduce a hydraulic forge press in 1885, and was quick to adopt electric lighting in 1888. In 1893 Gusto had bought the boiler factory Renson & Co in Grâce-Berleur near Liège.

Gusto also finished ships for which the hull had been built elsewhere. The construction of the hull by others proved too risky. In 1887 it bought the grounds and inventory of the machine factory, iron foundry and shipyard 'De Atlas' in Amsterdam for 150,000 guilders, but this was no success. In 1889 it sold the grounds again. In 1894 Gusto then bought shipyard 'De Industrie' in Slikkerveer from P. Smit jr., which company left for Rotterdam. The time in Slikkerveer was one of great expansion. Over 200 vessels were built, mainly for dredging, and almost all of them for foreign customers.

== History of Gusto Schiedam ==
=== The shipyard in Schiedam ===
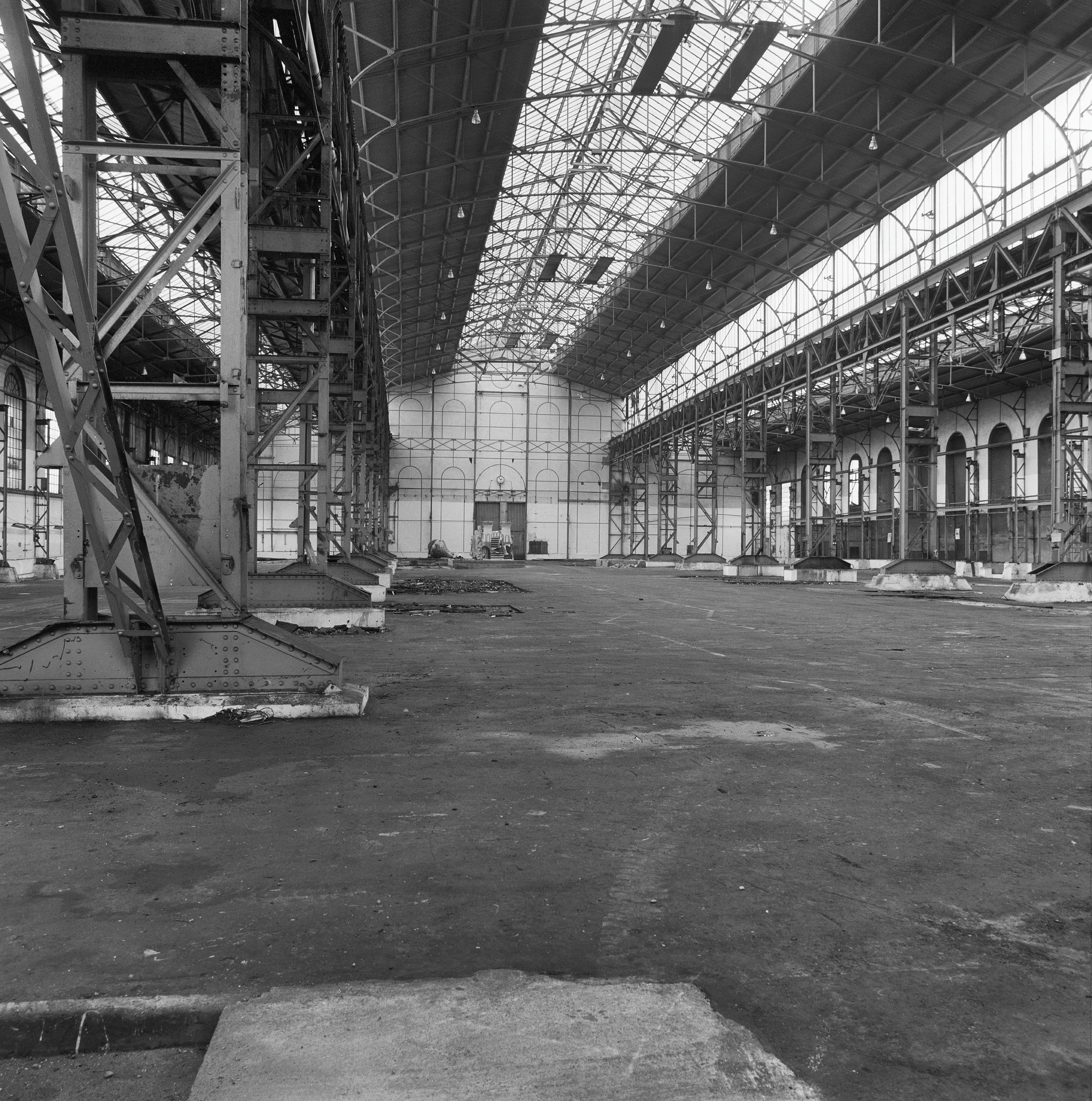
Main hall in Schiedam

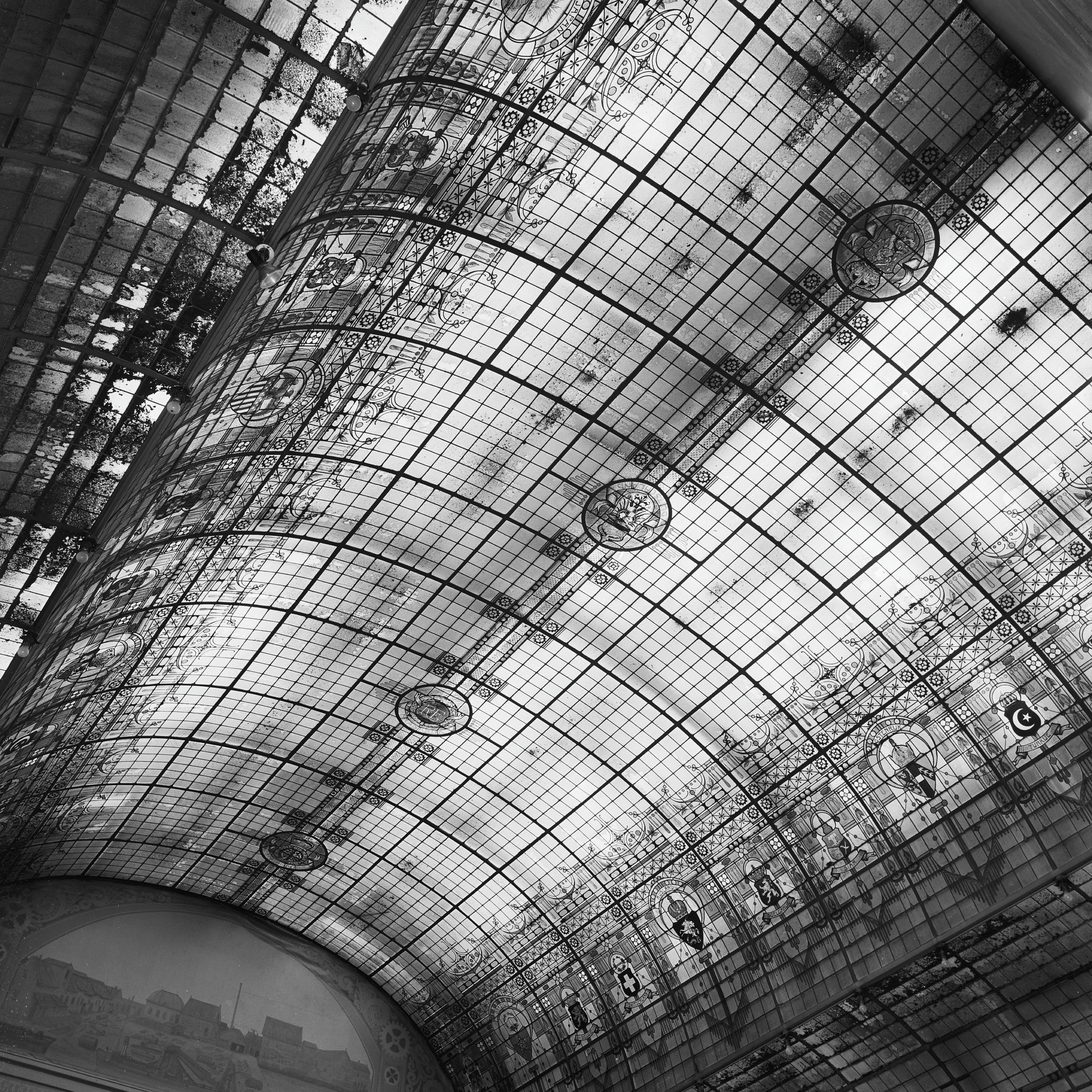
Monumental glass ceiling

In the last decades of the nineteenth century two of Guust's sons: Henri Smulders (1863-1933) and Frans Smulders (1871-1937) took control. This was made legal in 1900. In 1901 the partnership A.F. Smulders represented by Henri and Frans Smulders bought grounds for a harbor on the Nieuwe Maas, from whence ships could reach the sea without hindrance from bridges or locks.

In Schiedam a new shipyard was built, which once again combined a shipyard and a machine factory. It was opened on 1 June 1905, and gradually the employees from Utrecht (500) and Slikkerveer (800) were transferred to the new shipyard. In 1911 the name of the company was officially changed to Gusto, which seems a concatenation of the first names of Guust and his wife Catherina (Cato). In Schiedam the massive production of dredging vessels continued. Floating cranes (first in 1908) and floating sheerlegs (first in 1910) became a new specialty. Coal elevators became another specialty. A coal elevator was a machine to bunker coal mechanically. It eliminating a very tedious and labor intensive manual process. In Schiedam, Gusto also build bridges, which proved a savior during the Great Depression. Meanwhile the old shipyard in Slikkerveer continued to operate for a while, and was sold in 1917.

Important developments in Schiedam were the production of sea-going ships, torpedo boats and minesweepers for the Dutch Navy. Gusto had also been involved in founding Koninklijke Hoogovens in 1917, leading to many construction orders.

The company retained the characteristics of a family enterprise for a considerable period. Members of the Smulders family occupied prominent executive positions and were also the actual shareholders of the firm. From November 1934 onward, Hendrik Willem Ackermans served on the Supervisory Board of the Gusto shipyard, assuming its chairmanship in February 1937. At the outbreak of the Second World War, the shipyard was managed by Harry Smulders (a son of Frans Smulders) and N.W. Conijn (a son-in-law of Henri Smulders).

=== World War II ===
Just before World War II Gusto had invested in license producing motor torpedo boats designed by the British Power Boat Company. During the war two of these were finished according to the original plans. Eight more were completed according to revised specifications, and used by the Germans in the Mediterranean. In general the Dutch authorities were not pleased with Gusto's role in World War II.

During the war, the partnership IHC Holland was founded. It was a cooperation of shipyards that were focused on dredging material and cranes. Members were: Conrad Shipyard in Haarlem, Gusto shipyard in Schiedam, Machine Factory De Klop in Sliedrecht, J. & K. Smit in Kinderdijk, L. Smit en Zoon in Kinderdijk and Verschure & Co's in Amsterdam. While these shipyards remained independent, they shared their patents, so they could profit from each other's knowledge. They also had a common organization to do representation and sales abroad, leading to greater efficiency in marketing and sales.

=== IHC partnership and offshore equipment (1945-1965) ===
After the war Gusto first resumed building dredging vessels and small ships. In 1958 Gusto got an order from the then Royal Dutch Shell to design a jackup rig which would not infringe on the patents held by Delong en LeTourneau, which enabled American constructors to monopolize this market. In 1959 Gusto then got the order for Seashell, which was the first jackup rig built outside the USA. In 1963 Gusto built some jack up crane platforms, for which it cooperated with Verschure Shipyard and Conrad Shipyard.

== IHC Holland NV (1965-1978) ==
=== Focus on offshore ===
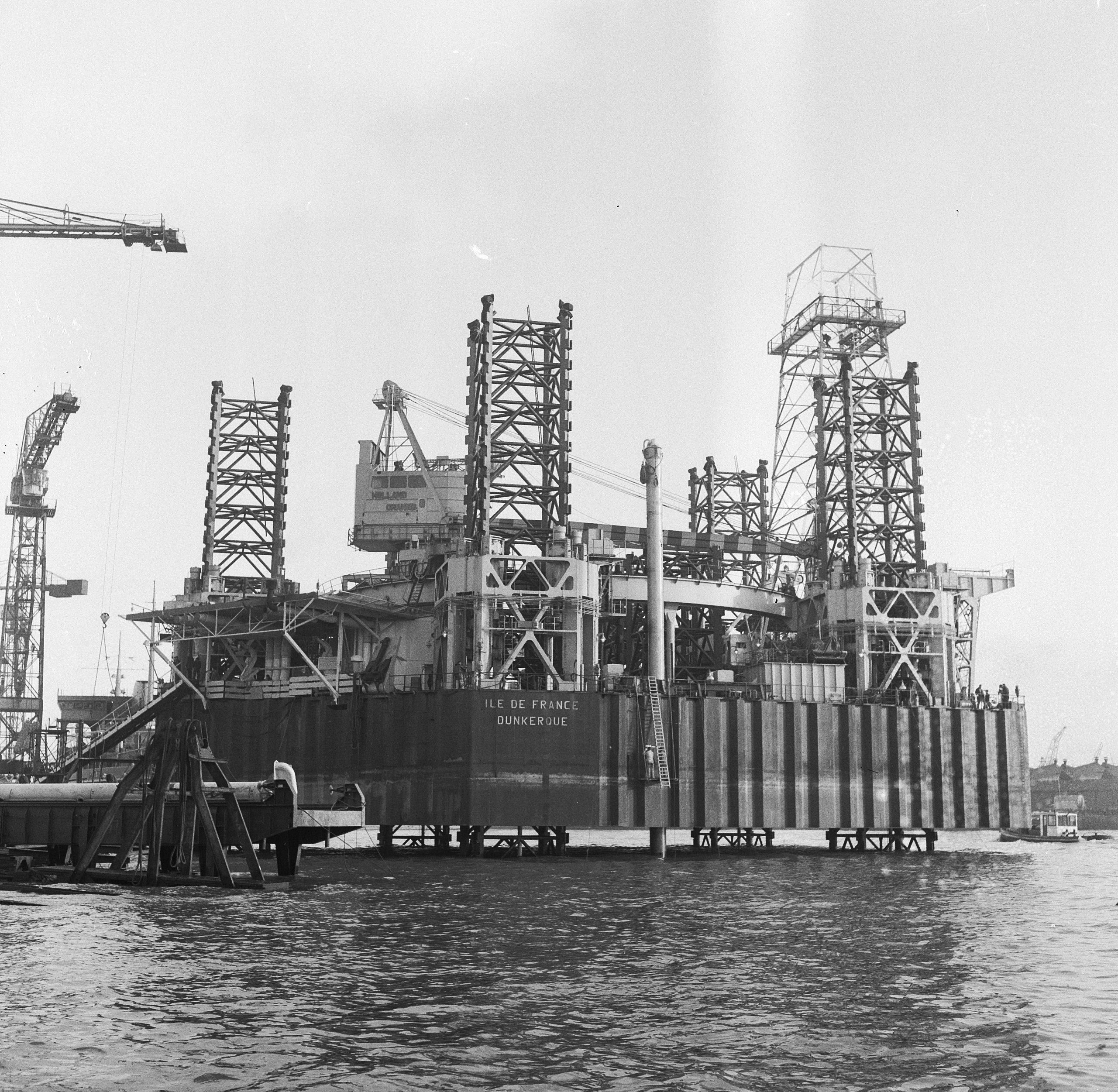
Jackup rig Ile de France

In 1965 the partners of IHC merged into a new company, losing their independence. Conrad Stork could not join, because it had become part of Stork. The name Gusto then changed into IHC Gusto B.V. The shipyard from then on focused only on Offshore products. In 1966 a first highlight was the rig Ile de France, with which the French company Foramer wanted to drill on the coast of Senegal. It was followed by three more jackup rigs. In 1971 Gusto launched the first of five drill ships. In 1966-1971 Gusto also built five big trailing suction dredgers. The construction of the big trailing dredgers seemed a nice development, but in fact it masked that Gusto was not able to compete on the market for big offshore constructions.

=== SBM ===
In 1960 Gusto had built the first single buoy mooring (SBM). It would lead to the development of a very successful and profitable line of products, including the Floating production storage and offloading unit. In the late 1960s Robert Smulders, grandson of A.F. Smulders and the last company director named Smulders, saw the potential of the offshore industry and the SBM. He also saw the dangerous developments in Dutch shipbuilding. On 27 February 1969 Robert Smulders founded SBM Inc. in Switzerland. Via SBM inc. IHC would survive the crisis in Dutch shipbuilding, but it would not save Gusto Shipyard.

=== Closure of Gusto Schiedam ===
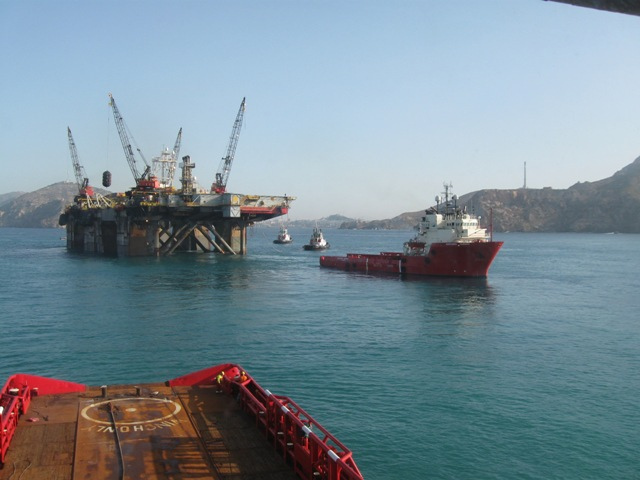
The gigantic Viking Piper

1973 with its oil crisis was a turning point for Gusto Shipyard. After that, it became increasingly difficult to get new orders in competition with low wage countries like Japan and South Korea. The situation was very much aggravated by a financial disaster with an IHC Holland offshore adventure in the USA. It had prevented the modernization of Gusto Schiedam, while other parts of IHC had been modernized. Meanwhile, the orders for big structures like the Viking Piper, Maersk Explorer and Brent SPAR led to heavy losses. Confronted with a government demand to reduce ship building capacity, the board of IHC then decided to sacrifice the old Gusto Shipyard.

The suspicious aspects of the closure are in the events surrounding the reorganization of the Dutch shipbuilding industry, presided by the Beleidscommissie Scheepsbouw (policy commission shipbuilding). Gusto was put in a group with large shipbuilders of large ships, e.g. supertankers, while Gusto was a medium-sized shipyard specializing in offshore. Later it became clear that not many supertankers would be built in the foreseeable future. The mega shipbuilder Rijn-Schelde-Verolme (RSV), whose president presided the commission, then planned to make its Rotterdamsche Droogdok Maatschappij the new offshore specialist of the Netherlands. And so Gusto Shipyard was closed in 1978. After closure all of its employees got a new contract with RSV.

=== Gusto Engineering ===
The engineering office of Gusto Shipyard was the most prestigious part of the company. After its employees had agreed to join RSV, it became RSV Gusto Engineering. When RSV stopped building new ships only a few years later, it came back under control of IHC. Initially, in 1980, IHC Inter N.V. and IHC Holland each bought a third of the engineering firm. In 1984, IHC Caland bought the remainder from RSV. Five years later, IHC Caland bought a successful design office specializing in jackup rigs, Marine Structure Consultants (MSC) and in 2011 Gusto Engineering and MSC were merged to form GustoMSC. In 2012, IHC Caland, by this time known as SBM Offshore, sold GustoMSC to ING Group Capital subsidiary Parcom Capital, an investment firm, for US$185 million. It was acquired by American oil rig and equipment manufacturer National Oilwell Varco (later renamed NOV Inc.) in 2018 and operated as a subsidiary.

== Construction list ==
| Yardno. | Co. No. | Name | Type | Principal | Year |
|---|---|---|---|---|---|
| 528 | | HNLMS Van Meerlant | Minelayer | Dutch Navy | 1922 |
| 529 | | HNLMS Douwe Aukes | Minelayer | Dutch Navy | 1922 |
| 677 | | Waalbrug in Nijmegen | Arch bridge | | 1933 |
| 684 | | John Frost Bridge in Arnhem | Arch bridge | | 1935 |
| 702 | | HNLMS Abraham Crijnssen | Minesweeper | Dutch Navy | 1937 |
| 703 | | HNLMS Eland Dubois | Minesweeper | Dutch Navy | 1937 |
| 714 | | HNLMS Jan van Gelder | Minesweeper | Dutch Navy | 1937 |
| 715 | | HNLMS Abraham van der Hulst | Minesweeper | Dutch Navy | 1937 |
| 167 | | Bascule for Van Brienenoord Bridge in Rotterdam | Bascule bridge | Rijkswaterstaat | 1961 |
| | 928 | Viking Piper | Pipe-laying ship | Viking Jersey Equipment | 1975 |
| | 938 | Brent Spar | Upper structure | Shell/ Esso | 1976 |
