= HNLMS Abraham van der Hulst =

HNLMS Abraham van der Hulst (Dutch: Hr.Ms. or Zr.Ms. Abraham van der Hulst) may refer to following ships of the Royal Netherlands Navy:

- HNLMS Abraham van der Hulst (1937), a Jan van Amstel-class minesweeper launched in 1937 and scuttled in 1940. She was raised by Germany and incorporated in the Kriegsmarine as M.552. She was sunk in 1944
- HNLMS Abraham van der Hulst (1946), a Jan van Amstel-class minesweeper laid down as HNLMS Willem van Ewijck in 1940 she was seized by Germany while still incomplete. Completed and commissioned as M.553 by the Kriegsmarine she was retroceded in 1945 and renamed Abraham van der Hulst on commissioning in the following year. She was discarded in 1961
- HNLMS Abraham van der Hulst (F832), a Karel Doorman-class frigate launched in 1991. She was sold to Chile and renamed Almirante Blanco Encalada in 2006
