= HNLMS Pieter Florisz =

HNLMS Pieter Florisz is the name of the following ships of the Royal Netherlands Navy named for Pieter Floriszoon:

- HNLMS Pieter Florisz (1937), a Jan van Amstel-class minesweeper scuttled in 1940, recovered by the German Navy, returned to The Netherlands in 1945 and served 1946–1961, scrapped 1976
- HNLMS Peter Florisz (F812), a Kortenaer-class frigate sold to Greece prior to Dutch service and commissioned as Elli in 1982
- HNLMS Pieter Florisz (F826), a Kortenaer-class frigate in commission 1983–2001, sold to Greece and commissioned as Bouboulina 2001–2013
