= HNLMS Willem van Ewijck =

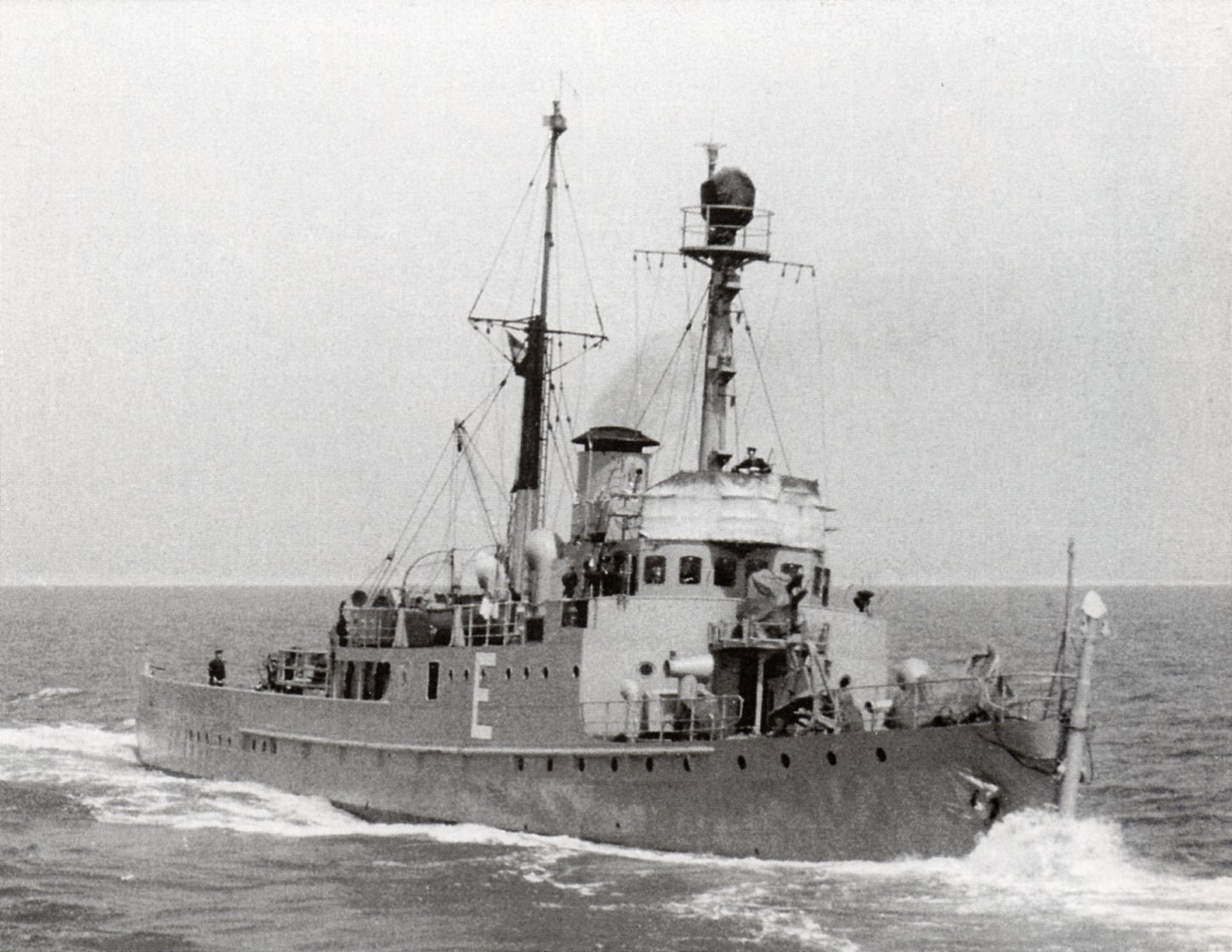
- Willem van Ewijck

History

Netherlands
- Name: Willem van Ewijck
- Builder: P. Smit, Rotterdam
- Laid down: 1936
- Launched: 22 February 1937
- Commissioned: 19 July 1937
- Fate: Sunk, 8 September 1939

General characteristics
- Class & type: Jan van Amstel-class minesweeper
- Displacement: 460 long tons (467 t)
- Length: 56.8 m (186 ft 4 in)
- Beam: 7.8 m (25 ft 7 in)
- Draft: 2.2 m (7 ft 3 in)
- Installed power: 2 × Yarrow boilers; 1,600 ihp (1,193 kW)
- Propulsion: 2 shafts, 2 × triple expansion engines
- Speed: 15 knots (28 km/h; 17 mph)
- Complement: 45
- Armament: 1 × single 3 in (76 mm) gun; 2 × twin .50-calibre machine guns

HNLMS Willem van Ewijck was a Jan van Amstel-class minesweeper of the Royal Netherlands Navy.

The vessel was named after Willem van Ewijck. Ships of the Jan van Amstel-class were designed to serve not only as minesweepers but could also be configured for minelaying operations.

== Description ==
The Jan van Amstel-class ships were 55.8 metres (183 ft 1 in) long, with a beam of 7.8 metres (25 ft 7 in) and a draught of 2.2 metres (7 ft 3 in) at deep load. They displaced was 450 long tons (460 t) at normal load, which increased to 585 long tons (594 t) at deep load. A pair of Yarrow boilers fed steam to two triple-expansion steam engines that each drove a single propeller shaft. The engines were rated at 1,690 indicated horsepower (1,260 kW) which gave the ships a speed of 15 knots (28 km/h; 17 mph). They carried up to 110 long tons (110 t) of fuel oil and had a complement of 45 officers and ratings.

== Fate ==
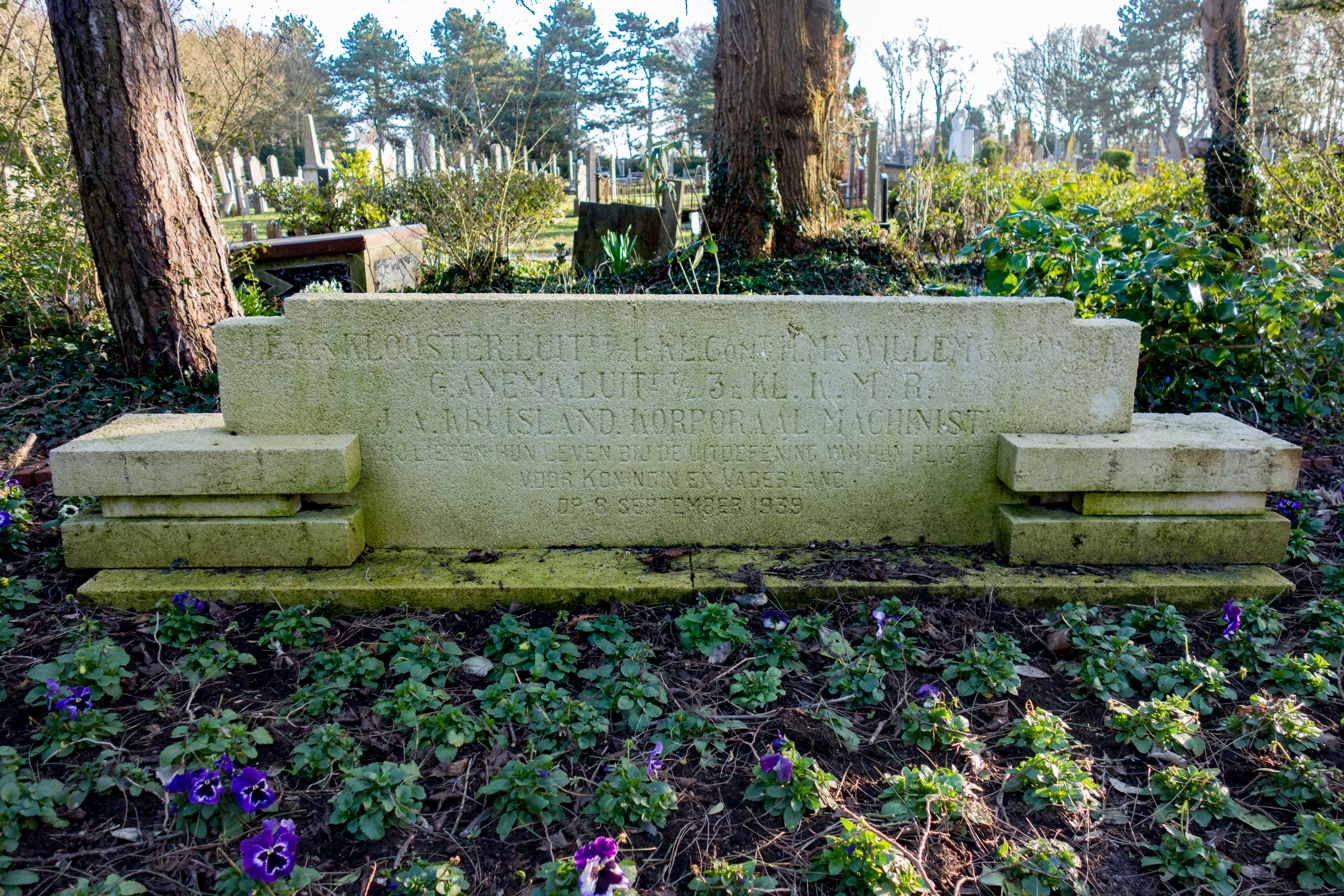
Memorial monument in Huisduinen

Footage of the funeral

On the afternoon of 8 September 1939, the Dutch minelayer Nautilus and the minesweepers Pieter Florisz, Jan van Gelder, Abraham van der Hulst, and Willem van Ewijck were conducting a sweep and inspection of naval minefields near the Boomkensdiep channel, off the coast of Terschelling. Shortly after noon, Willem van Ewijck struck an active defensive mine, estimated to contain approximately 200 kilograms of high explosive. The force of the blast reportedly lifted the vessel out of the water, breaking it in two. The ship sank within moments, taking much of the crew with it. 30 people died. A total of 26 of the 51 crew members died directly with four sustaining severe injuries who later died as a result. A number of the 51 crew members were not on board at the time of the explosion, as they had been in the motor launch of the minesweeper. Although the launch was operating in close proximity to the ship, it was propelled several meters into the air by the force of the blast.

The deceased were buried at the cemetery in Huisduinen. The funeral procession included the Royal Netherlands Navy's staff band, a Marine Corps firing party, 24 non-commissioned officers, and the hearses. A large number of mourners gathered along the route to pay their respects.

The wreck has never been located and is believed to lie buried beneath the sand at Engelse Hoek, west of the Boomkensdiep channel between Terschelling and Vlieland.

== Bibliography ==
- Roberts, John (1980). "The Netherlands". In Chesneau, Roger (ed.). Conway's All the World's Fighting Ships 1922–1946. Greenwich, UK: Conway Maritime Press. pp. 385–396. ISBN 0-85177-146-7.
- van Willigenburg, Henk (2010). Dutch Warships of World War II. Emmen: Lanasta. ISBN 978-90-8616-318-2.
