= HNLMS Van Amstel =

HNLMS Van Amstel (Dutch: Hr.Ms. or Zr.Ms. Van Amstel) may refer to following ships of the Royal Netherlands Navy:

- HNLMS Van Amstel (F806), a Cannon-class destroyer escort launched in 1943 as USS Burrows, renamed on transfer to the Netherlands in 1950; she was scrapped in 1968
- HNLMS Van Amstel (F831), a Karel Doorman-class frigate launched in 1990

== See also ==
- HNLMS Jan van Amstel
