= HNLMS Abraham van der Hulst (1946) =

Dutch Navy vessel

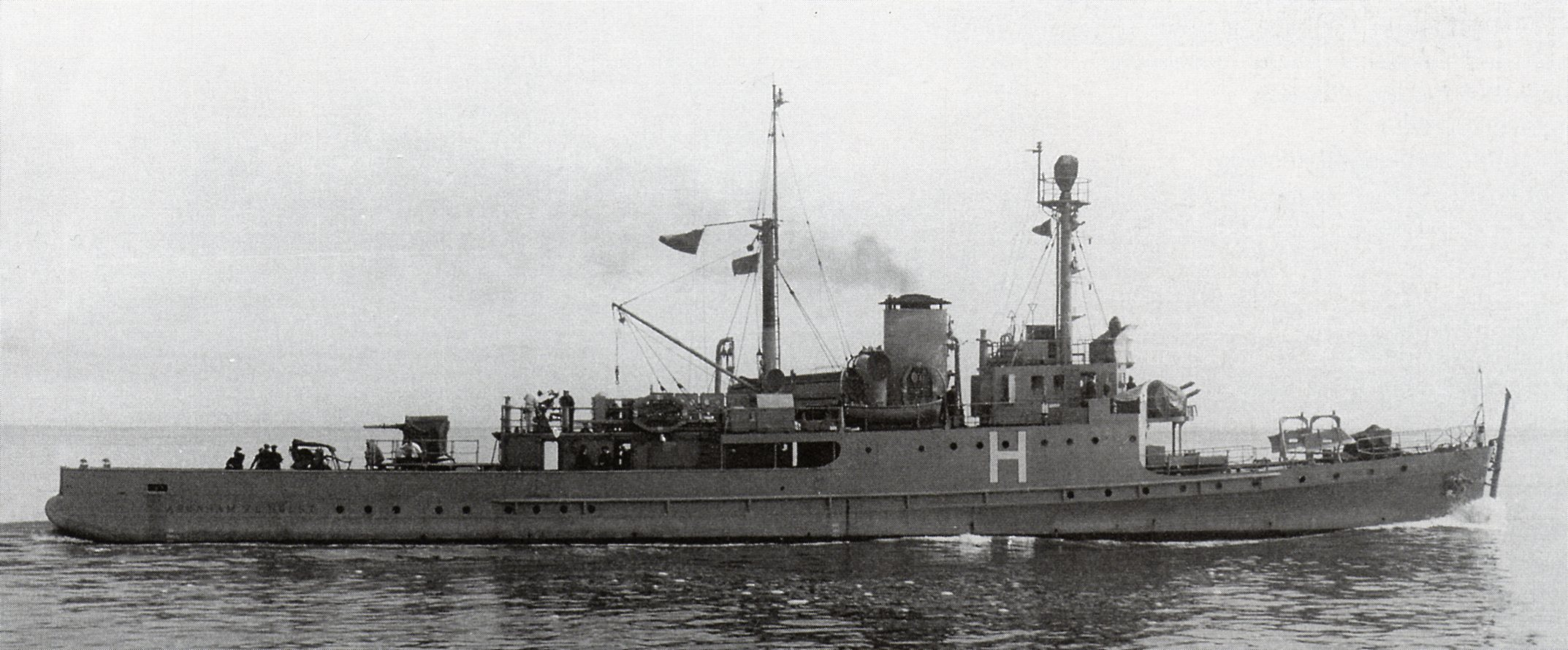
- The previous Abraham van der Hulst, replaced by this ship after being scuttled in 1940

History

Netherlands
- Name: Willem van Ewijck
- Builder: P. Smit, Rotterdam
- Laid down: 1940

Germany
- Name: M 553
- Launched: 26 August 1940
- Commissioned: 1940
- Decommissioned: 1945
- Fate: Returned to the Netherlands

Netherlands
- Name: Abraham van der Hulst
- Namesake: Abraham van der Hulst
- Acquired: May 1945
- Recommissioned: 1946
- Decommissioned: 1961
- Fate: Scrapped

General characteristics
- Class & type: Jan van Amstel-class minesweeper
- Displacement: 460 long tons (467 t)
- Length: 56.8 m (186 ft 4 in)
- Beam: 7.8 m (25 ft 7 in)
- Draft: 2.2 m (7 ft 3 in)
- Installed power: 2 × Yarrow boilers; 1,600 ihp (1,193 kW)
- Propulsion: 2 shafts; 2 × triple expansion engines
- Speed: 15 knots (28 km/h; 17 mph)
- Complement: 45
- Armament: 1 × 3 in (76 mm) gun; 2 × twin .50-calibre machine guns

HNLMS Abraham van der Hulst was a Jan van Amstel-class minesweeper of the Royal Netherlands Navy.

== Description ==
The Jan van Amstel-class ships were 55.8 metres (183 ft 1 in) long, with a beam of 7.8 metres (25 ft 7 in) and a draught of 2.2 metres (7 ft 3 in) at deep load. They displaced was 450 long tons (460 t) at normal load, which increased to 585 long tons (594 t) at deep load. A pair of Yarrow boilers fed steam to two triple-expansion steam engines that each drove a single propeller shaft. The engines were rated at 1,690 indicated horsepower (1,260 kW) which gave the ships a speed of 15 knots (28 km/h; 17 mph). They carried up to 110 long tons (110 t) of fuel oil and had a complement of 45 officers and ratings.

== Service history ==
Built as a replacement for Willem van Ewijck, she was not yet commissioned when the Netherlands surrendered to Germany in May 1940.

Commissioned into Nazi Germany's Kriegsmarine, first as AM 1 (also listed as MH 1) on 26 August 1940. She sailed for Emden on 30 August, where she was renamed M 553. She was converted to a torpedo recovery vessel in December 1940. In August 1944 she was transferred to the 27th U-boat Flotilla, responsible for the tactical training of U-boats.

Returned to the Royal Netherlands Navy in May 1945 and recommissioned as the Abraham van der Hulst (the Dutch naval authorities apparently thought her to be this ship). She sailed for the Dutch East Indies on 16 September 1946 for service as patrol ship. After returning to Europe, she was rebuilt as boom defence vessel. Struck in 1961 and transferred to the Zeekadetkorps Nederland (Dutch Sea Cadets) in February 1962. Later scrapped.

== Bibliography ==
- Roberts, John (1980). "The Netherlands". In Chesneau, Roger (ed.). Conway's All the World's Fighting Ships 1922–1946. Greenwich, UK: Conway Maritime Press. pp. 385–396. ISBN 0-85177-146-7.
- van Willigenburg, Henk (2010). Dutch Warships of World War II. Emmen: Lanasta. ISBN 978-90-8616-318-2.
