= Borndiep-class minesweeper =

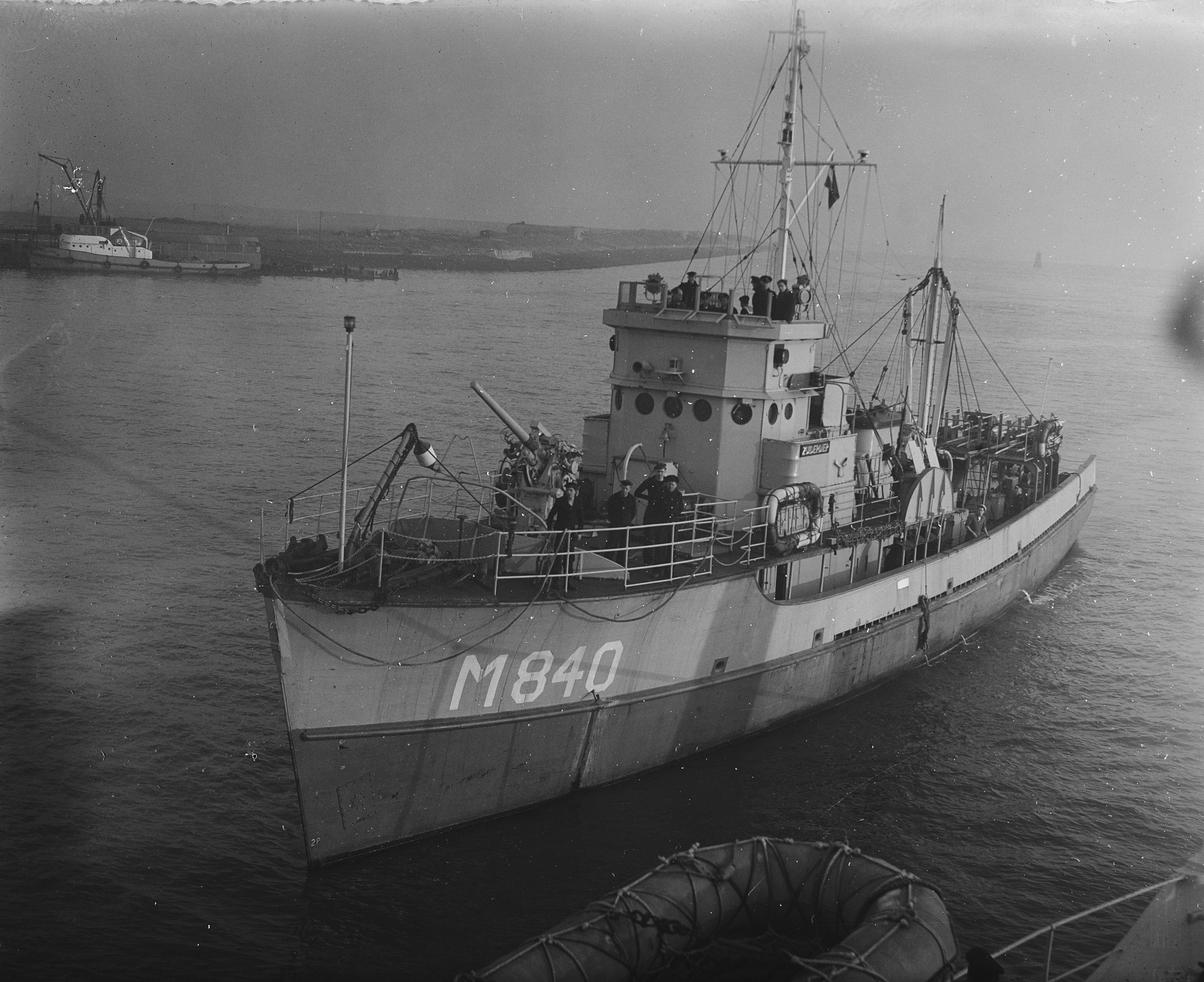
- Zuiderdiep

Class overview
- Name: Borndiep class
- Operators: Royal Netherlands Navy
- In commission: 1946-1962
- Planned: 10

General characteristics
- Type: Minesweeper
- Displacement: 250 t (250 long tons)
- Length: 41.5 m (136 ft 2 in)
- Beam: 7.5 m (24 ft 7 in)
- Draft: 2.6 metres (8 ft 6 in)
- Propulsion: 2 propellers; 1,000 hp (750 kW); General Motors diesel engines
- Speed: 13 knots (24 km/h; 15 mph)
- Crew: 27/29
- Armament: 1 x 7.6 cm gun; 2 x 20 mm guns

The Borndiep class was a ship class of 10 minesweepers that served between 1946 and 1962 in the Royal Netherlands Navy (RNN). They were former British Yard Mine Sweepers (BYMS) that were transferred from the Royal Navy to the RNN in 1946.

== Design ==
The minesweepers of the Borndiep class were equipped with mechanic, acoustic and magnetic sweepers. The magnetic sweeper consisted of two cables through which electricity would pulse and as a result would create a magnetic field that would detonate magnetic mines. As acoustic sweeper it had an electric hammer clock that would be thrown overboard to create vibrations which resulted in the destruction of acoustic mines. The mechanic sweeper consisted of a cable on each side of the ship with at the end of the cables a floater that would hit a mine to make it detonate.

== Service history ==
The Borndiep class was active in the North Sea after the Second World War to cleanup mines that were laid down during the war. Between 16 and 25 July 1954 several minesweepers of the Borndiep class took part in the NATO exercise "Haul".

== Ships in class ==
Borndiep-class construction data
Ship	Pennant No.	Commissioned	Decommissioned	Fate
Borndiep	M831	1946	1962	
Deurloo	M832	1947	1962	
Hollandsch Diep	M833	1946	1957	
Marsdiep	M834	1946	1962	
Oosterschelde	M835	1947	1957	
Texelstroom	M836	1946	1957	Used by the Zeekadetkorps in Amsterdam since 1957. Sold in 1976 to L.J. Coenmans.
Vliestroom	M837	1946	1962	Sold in 1964 to M.W. Hollander.
Volkerak	M838	1947	1957	Sold for scrap in 1960.
Westerschelde	M839	1947	1957	Used by the Technische Opleidingen Koninklijke Marine (TOKM) in Amsterdam.
Zuiderdiep	M840	1947	1962	
