= HNLMS Pieter de Bitter =

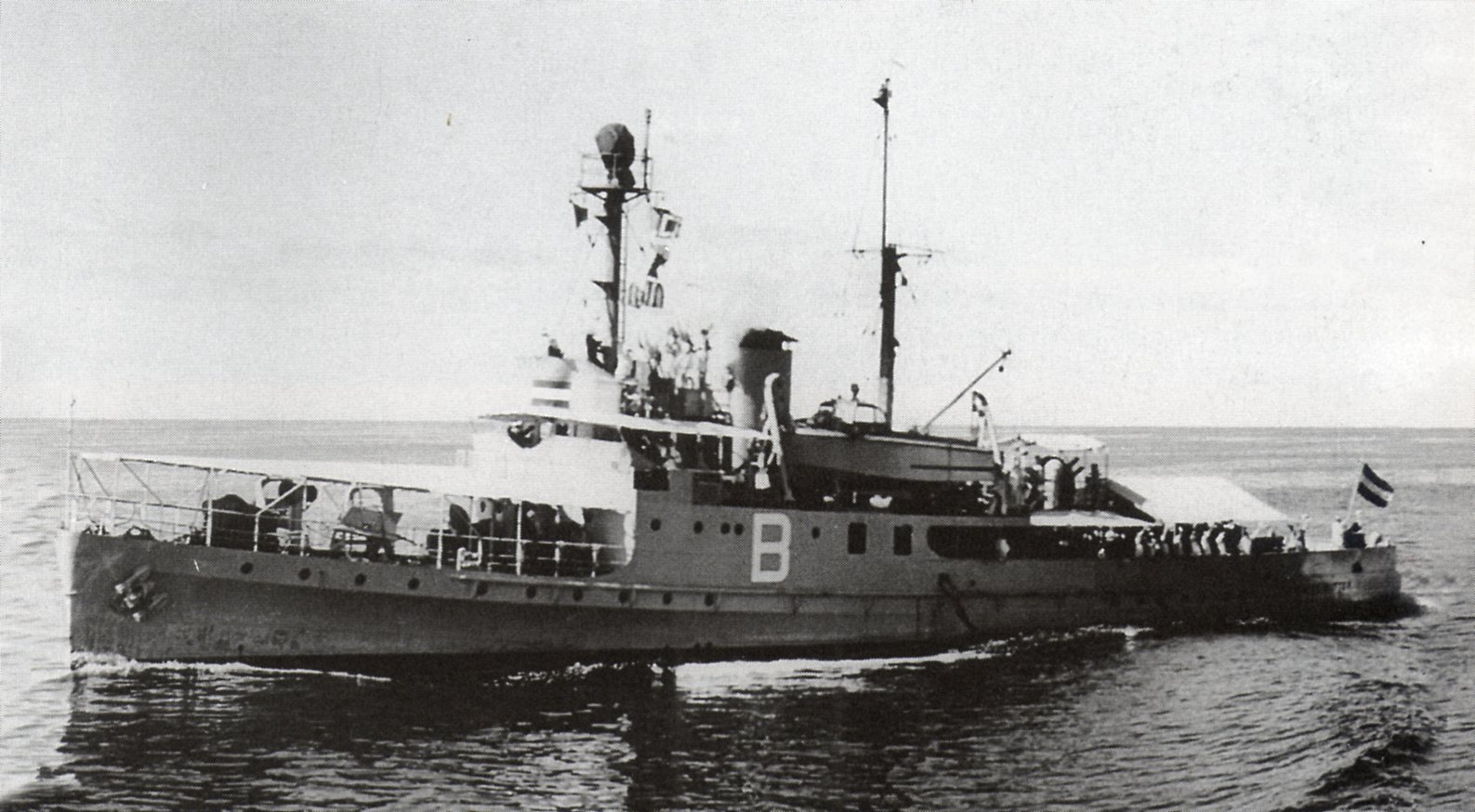
- Pieter de Bitter in late 1930s

History

Netherlands
- Name: Pieter de Bitter
- Namesake: Pieter de Bitter
- Builder: P. Smit, Rotterdam
- Laid down: 21 March 1936
- Launched: 29 October 1936
- Commissioned: 26 May 1937
- Fate: Scuttled, 6 March 1942

General characteristics
- Class & type: Jan van Amstel-class minesweeper
- Displacement: 460 long tons (467 t)
- Length: 56.8 m (186 ft 4 in)
- Beam: 7.8 m (25 ft 7 in)
- Draft: 2.2 m (7 ft 3 in)
- Installed power: 2 × Yarrow boilers; 1,600 ihp (1,193 kW)
- Propulsion: 2 shafts, 2 × triple expansion engines
- Speed: 15 knots (28 km/h; 17 mph)
- Complement: 45
- Armament: 1 × single 3 in (76 mm) gun; 2 × twin .50-calibre machine guns

HNLMS Pieter de Bitter was a Jan van Amstel-class minesweeper of the Royal Netherlands Navy that served in World War II.

== Description ==
The Jan van Amstel-class ships were 55.8 metres (183 ft 1 in) long, with a beam of 7.8 metres (25 ft 7 in) and a draught of 2.2 metres (7 ft 3 in) at deep load. They displaced was 450 long tons (460 t) at normal load, which increased to 585 long tons (594 t) at deep load. A pair of Yarrow boilers fed steam to two triple-expansion steam engines that each drove a single propeller shaft. The engines were rated at 1,690 indicated horsepower (1,260 kW) which gave the ships a speed of 15 knots (28 km/h; 17 mph). They carried up to 110 long tons (110 t) of fuel oil and had a complement of 45 officers and ratings.

== Service history ==
Pieter de Bitter was scuttled at Surabaya on 6 March 1942.

== Bibliography ==
- Roberts, John (1980). "The Netherlands". In Chesneau, Roger (ed.). Conway's All the World's Fighting Ships 1922–1946. Greenwich, UK: Conway Maritime Press. pp. 385–396. ISBN 0-85177-146-7.
- van Willigenburg, Henk (2010). Dutch Warships of World War II. Emmen: Lanasta. ISBN 978-90-8616-318-2.
