= HNLMS Abraham Crijnssen (1936) =

Dutch minesweeper

Coordinates: 52°57′50″N 04°46′15″E

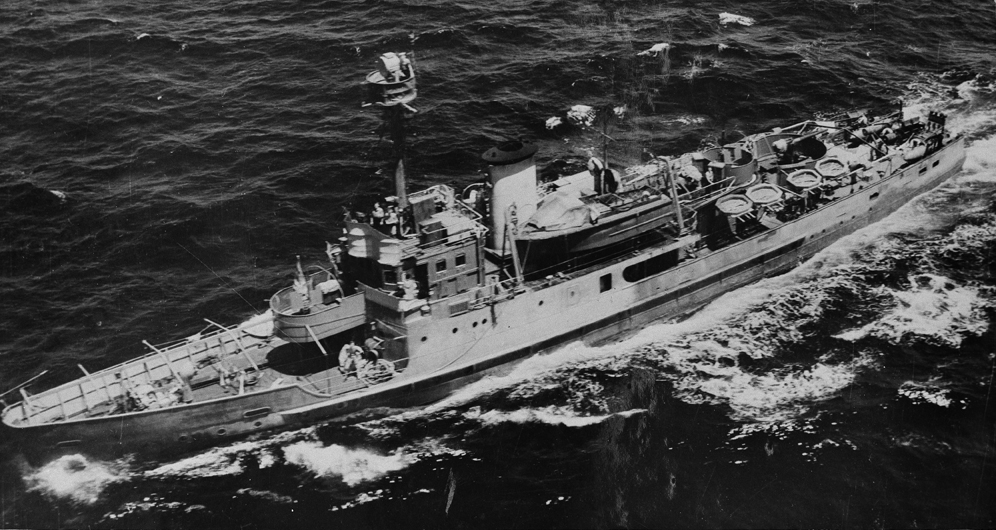
- HMAS/HNLMS Abraham Crijnssen

History

Netherlands
- Name: HNLMS Abraham Crijnssen
- Namesake: Abraham Crijnssen
- Builder: Werf Gusto, Schiedam, The Netherlands
- Laid down: 21 March 1936
- Launched: 22 September 1936
- Commissioned: 27 May 1937
- Decommissioned: 26 August 1942
- Fate: Transferred to the RAN

Australia
- Name: HMAS Abraham Crijnssen
- Commissioned: 26 August 1942
- Decommissioned: 5 May 1943
- Fate: Returned to RNN

Netherlands
- Recommissioned: 5 May 1943
- Decommissioned: 29 May 1961
- Reclassified: Net-defence ship
- Status: Preserved as museum ship

General characteristics
- Class & type: Jan van Amstel-class minesweeper
- Displacement: 525 tons
- Length: 184 ft (56 m)
- Beam: 25 ft (7.6 m)
- Draught: 7 ft (2.1 m)
- Propulsion: 2 × Yarrow 3-drum boilers; 2 × Stork triple expansion engines, 1,690 ihp (1,260 kW); 2 shafts; 110 tons fuel oil
- Speed: 15 knots (28 km/h; 17 mph)
- Complement: 45
- Armament: 1 × 3 in (76 mm) gun; 2 × twin Oerlikon 20 mm cannons; Depth charges

HNLMS Abraham Crijnssen is a Jan van Amstel-class minesweeper of the Royal Netherlands Navy (RNN).

Built during the 1930s, she was based in the Dutch East Indies when Japan attacked at the end of 1941. Ordered to retreat to Australia, the ship was disguised as a tropical island to avoid detection, and was the last Dutch ship to escape from the region. On arriving in Australia in 1942, she was commissioned into the Royal Australian Navy (RAN) as HMAS Abraham Crijnssen and operated as an anti-submarine escort. Although returned to RNN control in 1943, she remained in Australian waters for most of World War II. After the war, Abraham Crijnssen operated on anti-revolution patrols in the East Indies, before returning to the Netherlands and being converted into a boom defence ship in 1956.

Removed from service in 1960, she was donated to the Netherlands Sea Cadet Corps for training purposes. In 1995, Abraham Crijnssen was acquired by the Dutch Navy Museum for preservation as a museum ship.

== Design and construction ==
Abraham Crijnssen was the third of eight Jan van Amstel-class minesweepers constructed for the RNN during the late 1930s. Built by Werf Gusto at their yard in Schiedam, South Holland, the minesweeper was launched on 22 September 1936, and commissioned into the RNN on 26 May 1937. She was named after 17th century naval commander Abraham Crijnssen.

Abraham Crijnssen and her sister ships were 184 feet (56 m) long, with a beam of 25 feet (7.6 m), a draught of 7 feet (2.1 m), and a displacement of 525 tons. The minesweepers were fitted with two Yarrow 3-drum boilers and two Stork triple expansion engines, which provided 1,690 ihp (1,260 kW) to two propeller shafts, allowing the ship to reach 15 knots (28 km/h; 17 mph). Abraham Crijnssen was armed with a single 3-inch gun, and two Oerlikon 20 mm cannon, plus a payload of depth charges. The standard ship's company was 45.

== Operational history ==
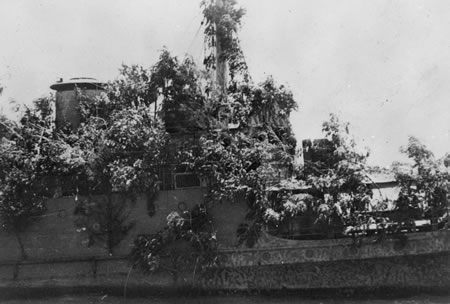
Close-up of the foliage used to camouflage the superstructure of the ship

=== Early service ===
The ship was based at Surabaya in the Netherlands East Indies when Japan invaded in 1941. Following the Allied defeats at the Battles of the Java Sea and Sunda Strait in late February 1942, all Allied ships were ordered to withdraw to Australia. Abraham Crijnssen was meant to sail with three other warships, but found herself proceeding alone.

To escape detection by Japanese aircraft, against which Abraham Crijnssen could not defend herself, she was heavily camouflaged with jungle foliage, giving the impression of a small island. Personnel cut down trees and branches from nearby islands, and arranged the cuttings to form a jungle canopy covering as much of the ship as possible. Any hull still exposed was painted to resemble rocks and cliffs. To further the illusion, the ship would remain close to shore, anchored and immobile during daylight, and only sail at night. She headed for Fremantle, Western Australia, where she arrived on 20 March 1942; Abraham Crijnssen was the last vessel to successfully escape Java, and the only ship of her class in the region to survive.

=== RAN service ===
After arriving in Australian waters, the minesweeper underwent a refit, which included the installation of new ASDIC equipment. On 28 September, she was commissioned into the RAN as HMAS Abraham Crijnssen. She was reclassified as an anti-submarine convoy escort, and was also used as a submarine tender for the Dutch submarines that relocated to Australia following the Japanese conquest. Her Dutch sailors were supplemented with survivors from the British destroyer HMS Jupiter and Australian personnel, all under the command of an Australian lieutenant. The wardroom tradition of hanging a portrait of the commissioned ship's reigning monarch led to some tension before it was decided to leave Queen Wilhelmina of the Netherlands on the bulkhead instead of replacing her with King George VI of the United Kingdom, which was installed in the lieutenant's cabin.

While escorting a convoy to Sydney through Bass Strait on 26 January 1943, Abraham Crijnssen detected a submarine on ASDIC. The convoy was ordered to scatter, while she and HMAS Bundaberg depth-charged the submarine contact. No wreckage of the suspected submarine was found. A pair of hastily released depth charges at the start of the engagement damaged the minesweeper; several fittings and pipes were damaged, and all of her centerline rivets had to be replaced during a week-long dry-docking.

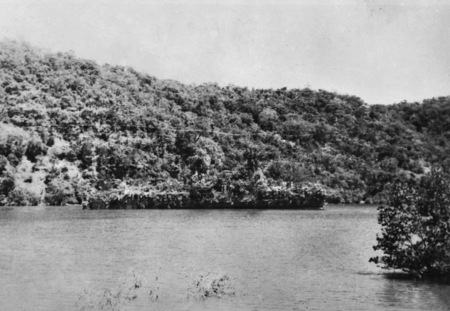
Abraham Crijnssen, in disguise as a jungle island

=== Return to RNN ===
Abraham Crijnssen was returned to RNN service on 5 May 1943, but remained in Australian waters for most of World War II. On 7 June 1945, she left Sydney for Darwin, with the oil lighter (and former submarine) K9 in tow. On 8 June, the tow cable snapped, and K9 washed ashore at Seal Rocks, New South Wales.

Abraham Crijnssen was used for mine-clearing sweeps of Kupang Harbour prior to the arrival of a RAN force to accept the Japanese surrender of Timor.

=== Post-war ===
After World War II, the minesweeper was used on anti-revolution patrols of the Netherlands East Indies. She left for the Netherlands in August 1951, and was converted into a boom defence vessel in March 1956.

== Decommissioning and preservation ==
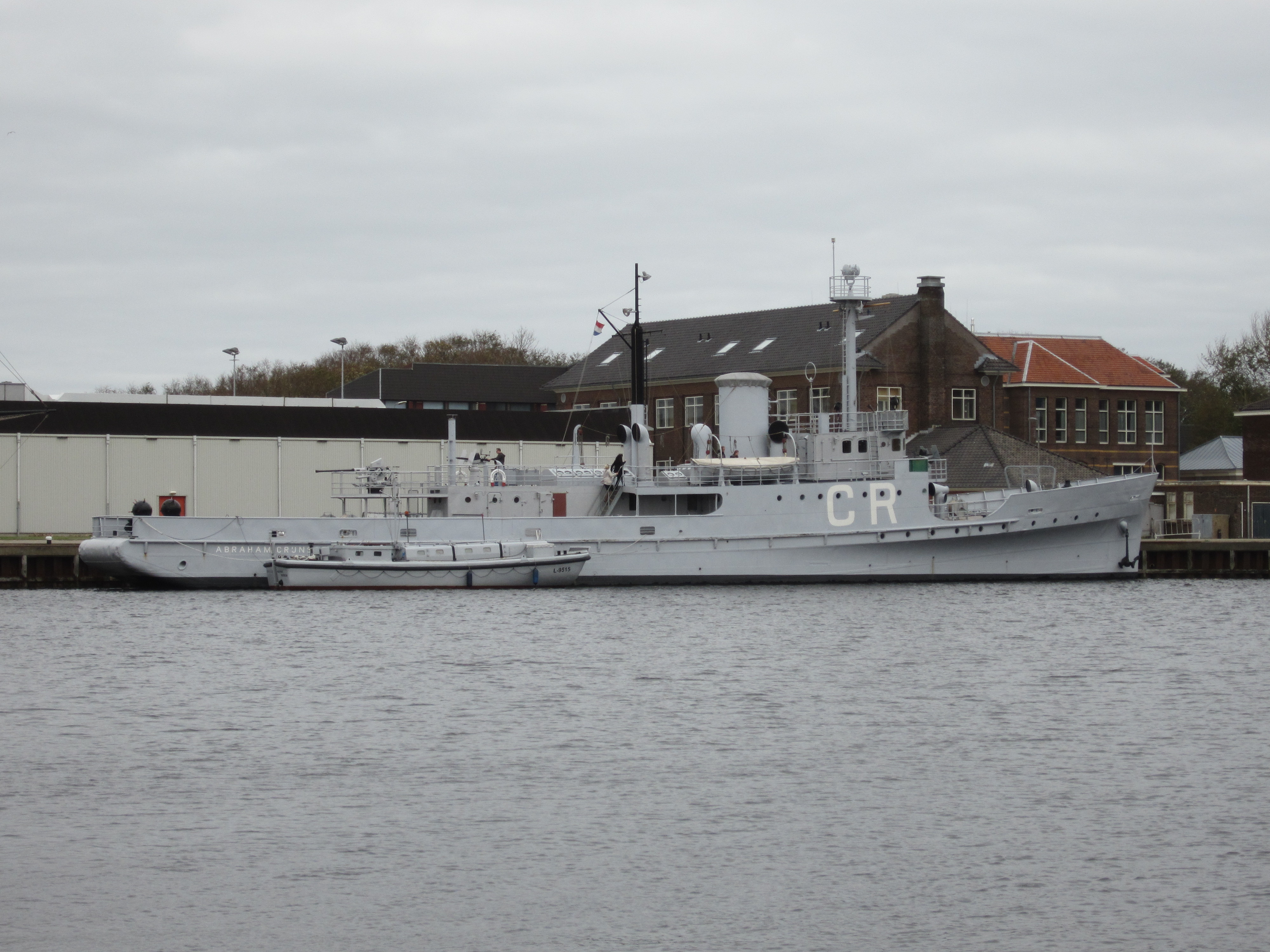
Abraham Crijnssen at the Dutch Navy Museum in Den Helder in 2011

Abraham Crijnssen was removed from the Navy List in 1960. After leaving service, she was donated to the Sea Cadet Corps (Zeekadetkorps Nederland) [NL] for training purposes. She was docked at The Hague from 1962 to 1972, after which she was moved to Rotterdam. The ship was also used as a storage hulk during this time.

In 1995, Abraham Crijnssen was marked for preservation by the Dutch Navy Museum at Den Helder. She was retrofitted to her wartime configuration.
