= HNLMS Eland Dubois =

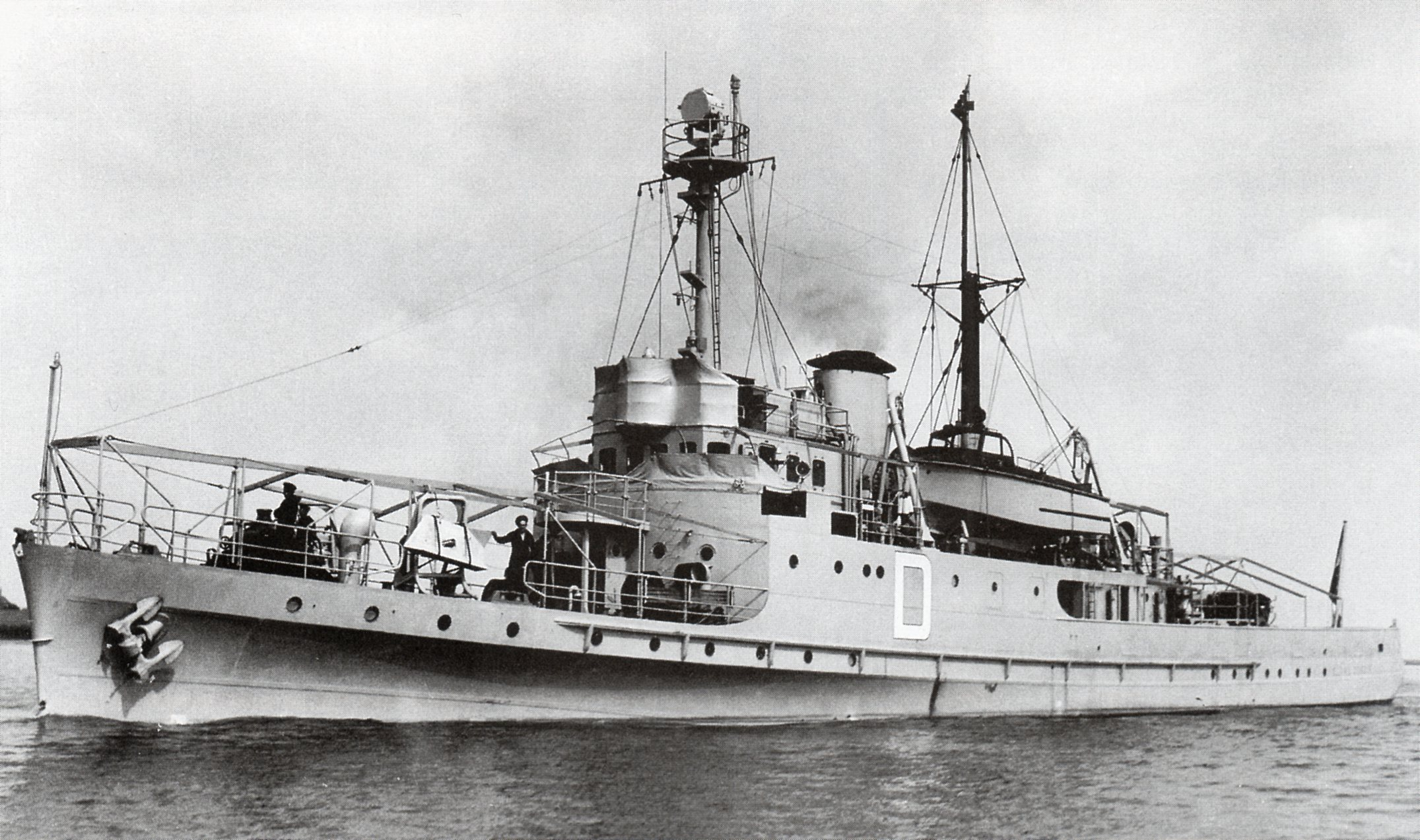
- Eland Dubois

History

Netherlands
- Name: Eland Dubois
- Builder: Gusto, Schiedam
- Laid down: 21 March 1936
- Launched: 24 October 1936
- Commissioned: 21 July 1937
- Fate: Scuttled, 8 March 1942

General characteristics
- Class & type: Jan van Amstel-class minesweeper
- Displacement: 460 long tons (467 t)
- Length: 56.8 m (186 ft 4 in)
- Beam: 7.8 m (25 ft 7 in)
- Draft: 2.2 m (7 ft 3 in)
- Installed power: 2 × Yarrow boilers; 1,600 ihp (1,193 kW)
- Propulsion: 2 shafts, 2 × triple expansion engines
- Speed: 15 knots (28 km/h; 17 mph)
- Complement: 45
- Armament: 1 × single 3 in (76 mm) gun; 2 × twin .50-calibre machine guns

HNLMS Eland Dubois was a Jan van Amstel-class minesweeper of the Royal Netherlands Navy that served in World War II.

== Description ==
The Jan van Amstel-class ships were 55.8 metres (183 ft 1 in) long, with a beam of 7.8 metres (25 ft 7 in) and a draught of 2.2 metres (7 ft 3 in) at deep load. They displaced was 450 long tons (460 t) at normal load, which increased to 585 long tons (594 t) at deep load. A pair of Yarrow boilers fed steam to two triple-expansion steam engines that each drove a single propeller shaft. The engines were rated at 1,690 indicated horsepower (1,260 kW) which gave the ships a speed of 15 knots (28 km/h; 17 mph). They carried up to 110 long tons (110 t) of fuel oil and had a complement of 45 officers and ratings.

== Service history ==
Eland Dubois was scuttled in the Madura Strait on 8 March 1942 after faulty boilers made it impossible for her to reach the safety of Australia. After sinking their ship the crew transferred to the Jan van Amstel, which was sunk with heavy loss of life later the same day.

== Bibliography ==
- Roberts, John (1980). "The Netherlands". In Chesneau, Roger (ed.). Conway's All the World's Fighting Ships 1922–1946. Greenwich, UK: Conway Maritime Press. pp. 385–396. ISBN 0-85177-146-7.
- van Willigeburg, Henk (2010). Dutch Warships of World War II. Emmen: Lanasta. ISBN 978-90-8616-318-2.
