= Jan van Amstel-class minesweeper =

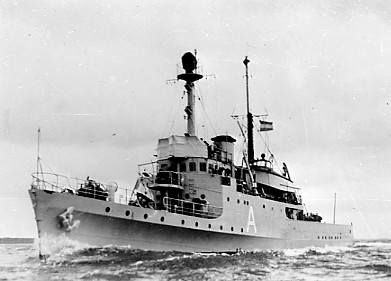
- HNLMS Jan van Amstel underway

Class overview
- Name: Jan van Amstel class
- Builders: Gusto, Schiedam; P. Smit, Rotterdam
- Operators: Royal Netherlands Navy; Kriegsmarine; Royal Navy; Royal Australian Navy
- Built: 1936–1940
- In service: 1937–1961
- Planned: 12
- Completed: 9
- Lost: 5
- Preserved: 1

General characteristics
- Type: Minesweeper
- Displacement: 460 long tons (467 t)
- Length: 56.8 m (186 ft 4 in)
- Beam: 7.8 m (25 ft 7 in)
- Draft: 2.2 m (7 ft 3 in)
- Installed power: 2 × Yarrow boilers; 1,600 ihp (1,193 kW)
- Propulsion: 2 shafts, 2 × triple expansion engines
- Speed: 15 knots (28 km/h; 17 mph)
- Complement: 45
- Armament: 1 × single 3 in (76 mm) gun; 2 × twin .50-calibre machine guns; 40 sea mines

The Jan van Amstel class was a class of nine minesweepers of the Royal Netherlands Navy, built to serve in the Dutch East Indies and Dutch territorial waters in Europe. The class was originally planned to consist of 12 ships, but because of the German occupation of the Netherlands in the Second World War, three of the four ships that were still under construction were never completed.

== Description ==
The Jan van Amstel-class ships were 55.8 metres (183 ft 1 in) long, with a beam of 7.8 metres (25 ft 7 in) and a draught of 2.2 metres (7 ft 3 in) at deep load. They displaced was 450 long tons (460 t) at normal load, which increased to 585 long tons (594 t) at deep load. A pair of Yarrow boilers fed steam to two triple-expansion steam engines that each drove a single propeller shaft. The engines were rated at 1,690 indicated horsepower (1,260 kW) which gave the ships a speed of 15 knots (28 km/h; 17 mph). They carried up to 110 long tons (110 t) of fuel oil and had a complement of 45 officers and ratings.

The ships could also be used as minelayers. The construction of the ships took place in two different shipyards, four by Gusto, Schiedam and five by P. Smit, Rotterdam.

== Ships in class ==
- Jan van Amstel : Commissioned 1937. Sunk 8 March 1942.
- Pieter de Bitter : Commissioned 1937. Scuttled 6 March 1942.
- Abraham Crijnssen : Commissioned 1937. Royal Australian Navy 26 August 1942–5 May 1943. Decommissioned 1961. Museum ship July 1997.
- Eland Dubois : Commissioned 1937. Scuttled 8 March 1942.
- Willem van Ewijck : Commissioned 1937. Sunk 8 September 1939.
- Pieter Florisz : Commissioned 1937. Scuttled 14 May 1940. Kriegsmarine 1940–1945. Recommissioned 1946. Struck 1961. Sold for scrap.
- Jan van Gelder : Commissioned 1937. Royal Navy 26 March 1943–1946. Struck 1961. Scrapped.
- Abraham van der Hulst (1937) : Commissioned 1937. Scuttled 14 May 1940. Kriegsmarine 1940–1944. Destroyed 20 August 1944.
- Abraham van der Hulst (1946) : Captured before commissioning. Kriegsmarine 1940–1945. Commissioned 1946. Struck 1961. Scrapped.

== See also ==
- List of minesweepers of the Royal Netherlands Navy

== Bibliography ==
- Roberts, John (1980). "The Netherlands". In Chesneau, Roger (ed.). Conway's All the World's Fighting Ships 1922–1946. Greenwich, UK: Conway Maritime Press. pp. 385–396. ISBN 0-85177-146-7.
- van Willigeburg, Henk (2010). Dutch Warships of World War II. Emmen: Lanasta. ISBN 978-90-8616-318-2.
