= HNLMS Jan van Gelder =

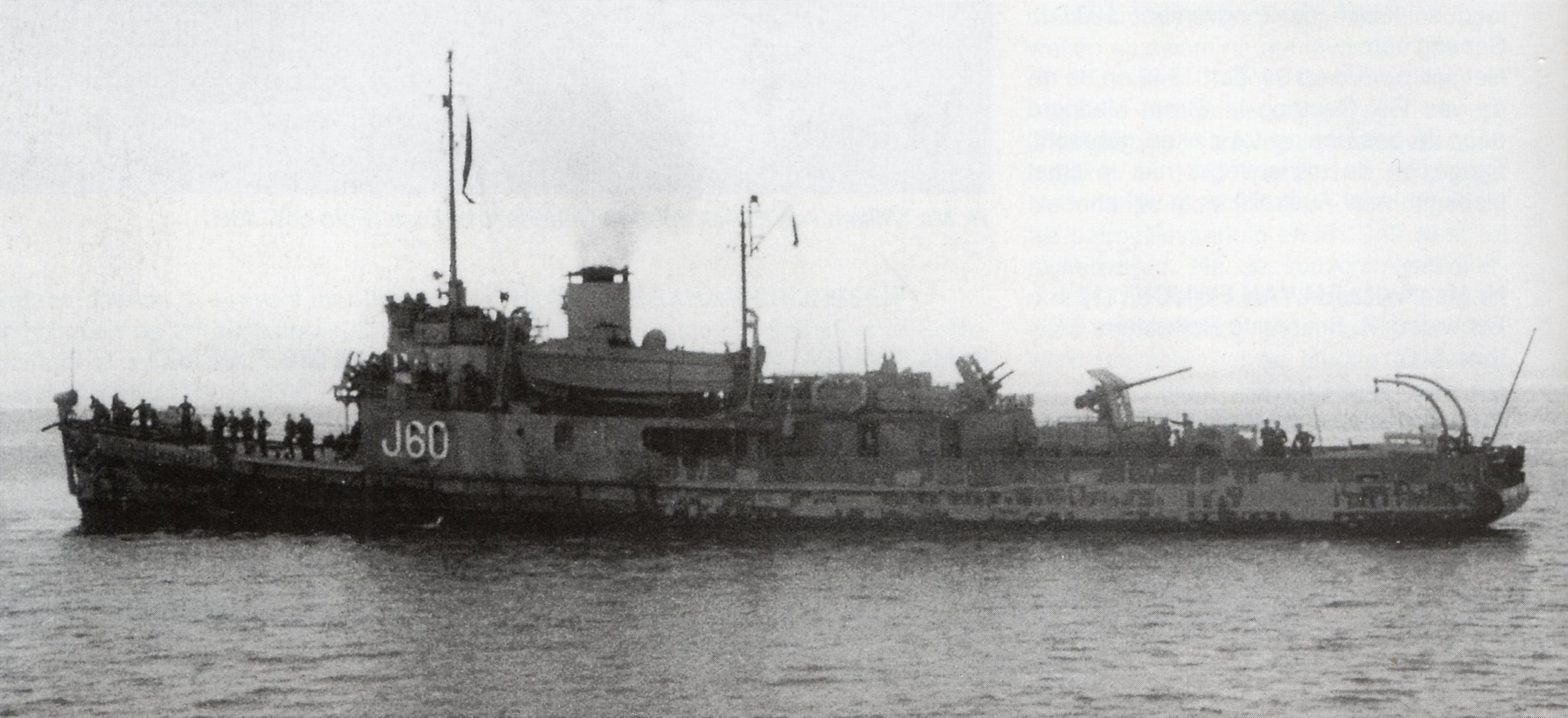
- Jan van Gelder in Royal Navy service

History

Netherlands
- Name: Jan van Gelder
- Builder: Gusto, Schiedam
- Laid down: 10 October 1936
- Launched: 27 March 1937
- Commissioned: 13 September 1937
- Recommissioned: 1946
- Decommissioned: 1961
- Stricken: 1961
- Fate: Scrapped, 1979

United Kingdom
- Name: Jan van Gelder (J60)
- Acquired: 26 March 1943
- Fate: Returned to the Netherlands, 1946

General characteristics
- Class & type: Jan van Amstel-class minesweeper
- Displacement: 460 long tons (467 t)
- Length: 56.8 m (186 ft 4 in)
- Beam: 7.8 m (25 ft 7 in)
- Draft: 2.2 m (7 ft 3 in)
- Installed power: 2 × Yarrow boilers; 1,600 ihp (1,193 kW)
- Propulsion: 2 shafts, 2 × triple expansion engines
- Speed: 15 knots (28 km/h; 17 mph)
- Complement: 45
- Armament: As built: 1 × single 3 in (76 mm) gun; 2 × twin .50-calibre machine guns; After 1940: 1 × 12-pdr gun; 2 × single Oerlikon 20 mm cannons

HNLMS Jan van Gelder was a Jan van Amstel-class minesweeper of the Royal Netherlands Navy that served in World War II.

== Description ==
The Jan van Amstel-class ships were 55.8 metres (183 ft 1 in) long, with a beam of 7.8 metres (25 ft 7 in) and a draught of 2.2 metres (7 ft 3 in) at deep load. They displaced was 450 long tons (460 t) at normal load, which increased to 585 long tons (594 t) at deep load. A pair of Yarrow boilers fed steam to two triple-expansion steam engines that each drove a single propeller shaft. The engines were rated at 1,690 indicated horsepower (1,260 kW) which gave the ships a speed of 15 knots (28 km/h; 17 mph). They carried up to 110 long tons (110 t) of fuel oil and had a complement of 45 officers and ratings.

== Service history ==
Jan van Gelder was damaged by her own mines off Terschelling on 1 October 1939. At least five men were killed. After initial repairs at Willemsoord, Den Helder, she received a new stern at Gusto, Schiedam, and was recommissioned on 17 April 1940.

During the invasion of the Netherlands by Germany in May 1940, she escorted the Dutch submarine O-13 to England. Later that month, on 29–31 May, she escorted the Dutch passenger ship Batavier II to Cherbourg, to pick up 280 Dutch troops.

Refitted and rearmed in 1940, she was assigned to serve with the British Royal Navy's 11th Minesweeping Flotilla, stationed in Milford Haven, Wales. Later in 1941 she served with the 9th Flotilla off Portland. She mainly acted as buoy ship, marking the swept channels. From October 1941, she swept acoustic mines off Harwich and the Isle of Wight. Later she was sent to Scotland and served as an escort ship with a British submarine flotilla. On 26 March 1943 she was transferred to the Royal Navy.

She was returned to the Netherlands in 1946 and was recommissioned in the Royal Netherlands Navy. She sailed for the Dutch East Indies where she served as patrol ship until 1950. After her return, she was rebuilt as boom defence vessel. Struck in 1961, she was then transferred to the Zeekadetkorps Nederland (Dutch Sea Cadets). She was assigned to the 'Jacob van Heemskerck' unit in the town of Schiedam, and moored at the same shipyard where she was launched 25 years earlier. The sea cadets removed the boilers for additional space, making the Jan van Gelder a stationary training ship ('floating clubhouse'). Because of severe leaking in the engine room, she was replaced in 1979, and scrapped.

== Bibliography ==
- Roberts, John (1980). "The Netherlands". In Chesneau, Roger (ed.). Conway's All the World's Fighting Ships 1922–1946. Greenwich, UK: Conway Maritime Press. pp. 385–396. ISBN 0-85177-146-7.
- van Willigenburg, Henk (2010). Dutch Warships of World War II. Emmen: Lanasta. ISBN 978-90-8616-318-2.
