= HNLMS Jan van Amstel =

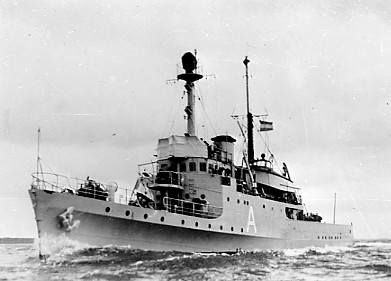
- Jan van Amstel

History

Netherlands
- Name: Jan van Amstel
- Namesake: Jan van Amstel
- Builder: P. Smit, Rotterdam
- Laid down: 21 March 1936
- Launched: 27 August 1936
- Commissioned: 15 March 1937
- Fate: Sunk, 8 March 1942

General characteristics
- Class & type: Jan van Amstel-class minesweeper
- Displacement: 460 long tons (467 t)
- Length: 56.8 m (186 ft 4 in)
- Beam: 7.8 m (25 ft 7 in)
- Draft: 2.2 m (7 ft 3 in)
- Propulsion: 2 × Yarrow 3-drum boilers; 2 × Stork triple expansion engines, 1,600 ihp (1,193 kW); 2 shafts
- Speed: 15 knots (28 km/h; 17 mph)
- Complement: 45
- Armament: 1 × 3 in (76 mm) gun; 2 × twin .50-calibre machine guns

HNLMS Jan van Amstel was a Jan van Amstel-class minesweeper of the Royal Netherlands Navy that served in World War II.

== Description ==
The Jan van Amstel-class ships were 55.8 metres (183 ft 1 in) long, with a beam of 7.8 metres (25 ft 7 in) and a draught of 2.2 metres (7 ft 3 in) at deep load. They displaced was 450 long tons (460 t) at normal load, which increased to 585 long tons (594 t) at deep load. A pair of Yarrow boilers fed steam to two triple-expansion steam engines that each drove a single propeller shaft. The engines were rated at 1,690 indicated horsepower (1,260 kW) which gave the ships a speed of 15 knots (28 km/h; 17 mph). They carried up to 110 long tons (110 t) of fuel oil and had a complement of 45 officers and ratings.

== Service history ==
Jan van Amstel was damaged by an air attack at Surabaya on 6 March 1942, which killed 23 of her crew.

After the capitulation of all forces on Java Jan van Amstel attempted to escape to Australia, but was intercepted and engaged by the Japanese destroyer Arashio on 8 March 1942 in the Madura Strait. She was sunk with heavy loss of life and her surviving crew taken prisoner.

== Bibliography ==
- Roberts, John (1980). "The Netherlands". In Chesneau, Roger (ed.). Conway's All the World's Fighting Ships 1922–1946. Greenwich, UK: Conway Maritime Press. pp. 385–396. ISBN 0-85177-146-7.
- van Willigenburg, Henk (2010). Dutch Warships of World War II. Emmen: Lanasta. ISBN 978-90-8616-318-2.
