= HNLMS Pieter Florisz (1937) =

Minesweeper

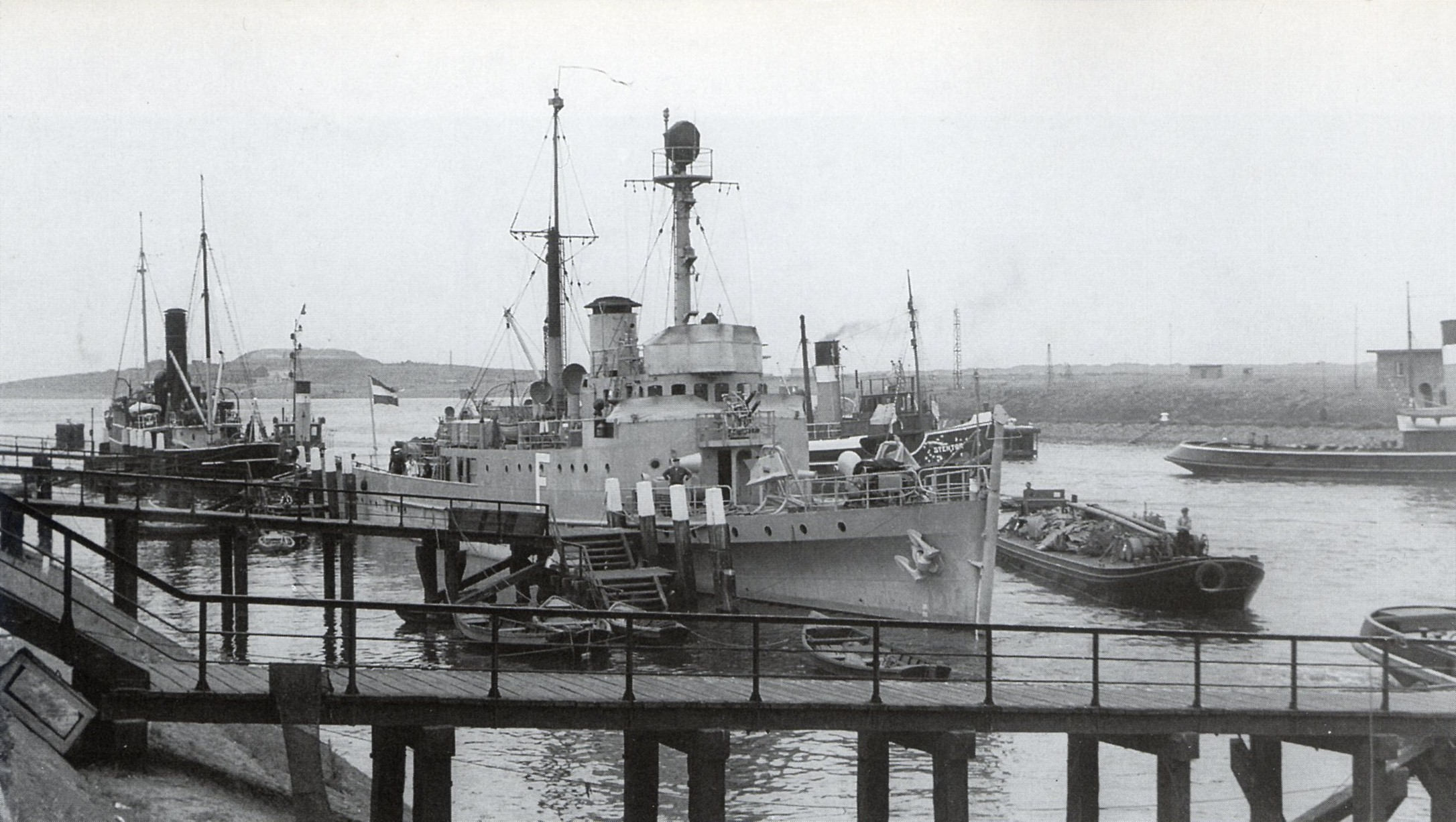
- Pieter Florisz at IJmuiden on June 24, 1938

History

Netherlands
- Name: Pieter Florisz
- Namesake: Pieter Floriszoon
- Builder: P. Smit, Rotterdam
- Laid down: 22 November 1936
- Launched: 11 May 1937
- Commissioned: 13 September 1937
- Fate: Scuttled, 14 May 1940

Nazi Germany
- Name: M 551
- Commissioned: 1940
- Decommissioned: 1945
- Fate: Returned to the Netherlands post-war

Netherlands
- Recommissioned: mid-1946
- Decommissioned: 1961
- Fate: Sold for scrap, 1976

General characteristics
- Class & type: Jan van Amstel-class minesweeper
- Displacement: 460 long tons (467 t)
- Length: 56.8 m (186 ft 4 in)
- Beam: 7.8 m (25 ft 7 in)
- Draft: 2.2 m (7 ft 3 in)
- Installed power: 2 × Yarrow boilers; 1,600 ihp (1,193 kW)
- Propulsion: 2 shafts, 2 × triple expansion engines
- Speed: 15 knots (28 km/h; 17 mph)
- Complement: 45
- Armament: 1 × single 3 in (76 mm) gun; 2 × twin .50-calibre machine guns

HNLMS Pieter Florisz was a Jan van Amstel-class minesweeper of the Royal Netherlands Navy and Nazi Germany's Kriegsmarine during World War II.

== Description ==
The Jan van Amstel-class ships were 55.8 metres (183 ft 1 in) long, with a beam of 7.8 metres (25 ft 7 in) and a draught of 2.2 metres (7 ft 3 in) at deep load. They displaced was 450 long tons (460 t) at normal load, which increased to 585 long tons (594 t) at deep load. A pair of Yarrow boilers fed steam to two triple-expansion steam engines that each drove a single propeller shaft. The engines were rated at 1,690 indicated horsepower (1,260 kW) which gave the ships a speed of 15 knots (28 km/h; 17 mph). They carried up to 110 long tons (110 t) of fuel oil and had a complement of 45 officers and ratings.

== Service history ==
Scuttled at Enkhuizen on 14 May 1940 after the Dutch surrender, the ship was salvaged by the Germans and commissioned into the Kriegsmarine.

In December 1940 she was converted to a torpedo recovery vessel and renamed M 551. In August 1944 the ship was assigned to the 27th U-boat Flotilla, responsible for the tactical training of U-boats.

In 1945 she was returned to the Royal Netherlands Navy, and repaired at the Willemsoord, Den Helder. Recommissioned under her original name in mid-1946, the ship served as fishery inspection vessel. On 16 September 1947 she sailed for the Dutch East Indies where she served as a patrol vessel, and later as a minesweeper with the 1st Flotilla at Surabaya. After her return to the Netherlands in 1950 the ship was converted to boom defence vessel.

Struck in 1961 and transferred to the Zeekadetkorps Nederland (Dutch Sea Cadets) at IJmuiden in 1962, the ship was finally decommissioned in September 1976 and sold for scrap.

== Bibliography ==
- Roberts, John (1980). "The Netherlands". In Chesneau, Roger (ed.). Conway's All the World's Fighting Ships 1922–1946. Greenwich, UK: Conway Maritime Press. pp. 385–396. ISBN 0-85177-146-7.
- van Willigeburg, Henk (2010). Dutch Warships of World War II. Emmen: Lanasta. ISBN 978-90-8616-318-2.
