= HNLMS Abraham van der Hulst (1937) =

Dutch ship

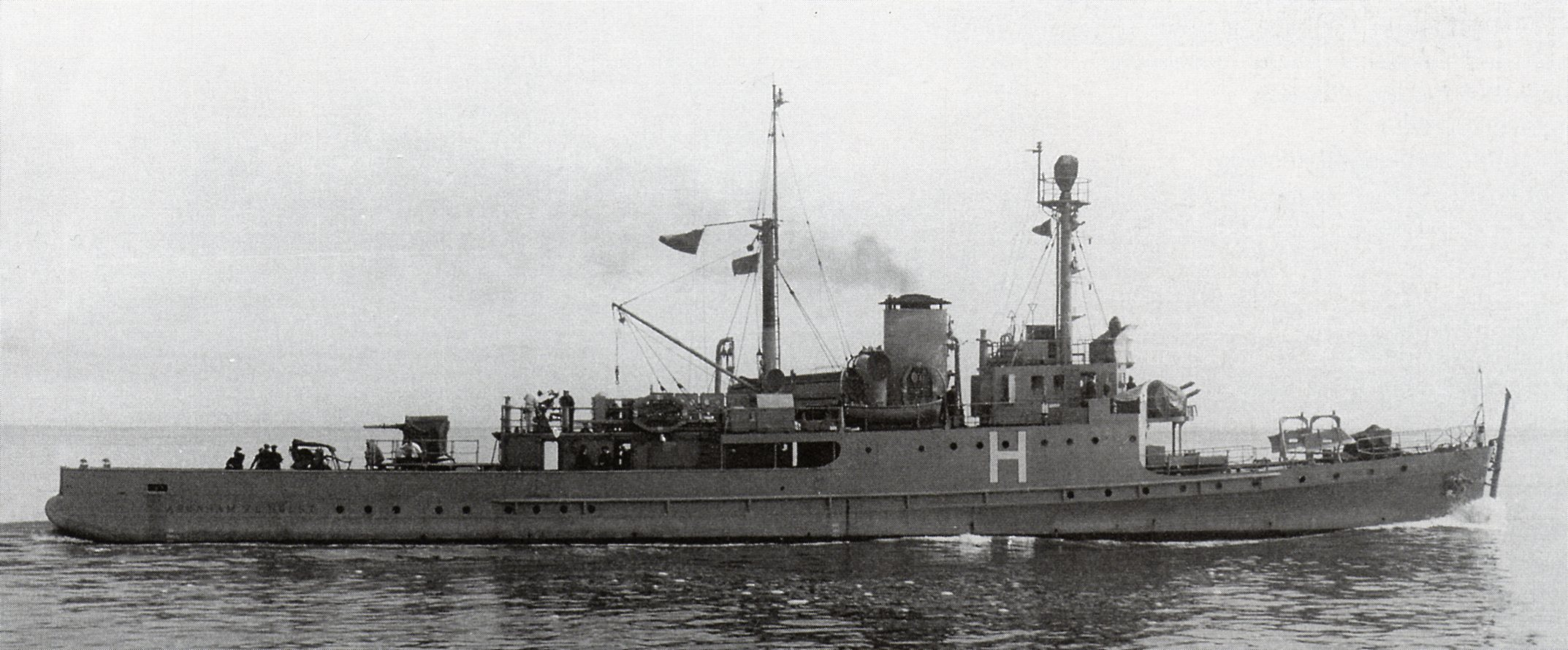
- Abraham van der Hulst in 1939

History

Netherlands
- Name: Abraham van der Hulst
- Namesake: Abraham van der Hulst
- Builder: Gusto, Schiedam
- Laid down: 13 November 1936
- Launched: 31 May 1937
- Commissioned: 11 October 1937
- Fate: Scuttled, 14 May 1940

Germany
- Name: M 552
- Commissioned: 1940
- Decommissioned: April 1944
- Fate: Destroyed in an air raid, 30 August 1944

General characteristics
- Class & type: Jan van Amstel-class minesweeper
- Displacement: 450 long tons (457 t) standard; 585 long tons (594 t)
- Length: 56.7 m (186 ft 0 in) oa; 55.80 m (183 ft 1 in) pp
- Beam: 7.8 m (25 ft 7 in)
- Draft: 2.2 m (7 ft 3 in)
- Installed power: 2 × Yarrow boilers; 1,600 ihp (1,193 kW)
- Propulsion: 2 shafts, 2 × triple expansion engines
- Speed: 15 knots (28 km/h; 17 mph)
- Complement: 45
- Armament: 1 × single 3 in (76 mm) gun; 2 × twin .50-calibre machine guns

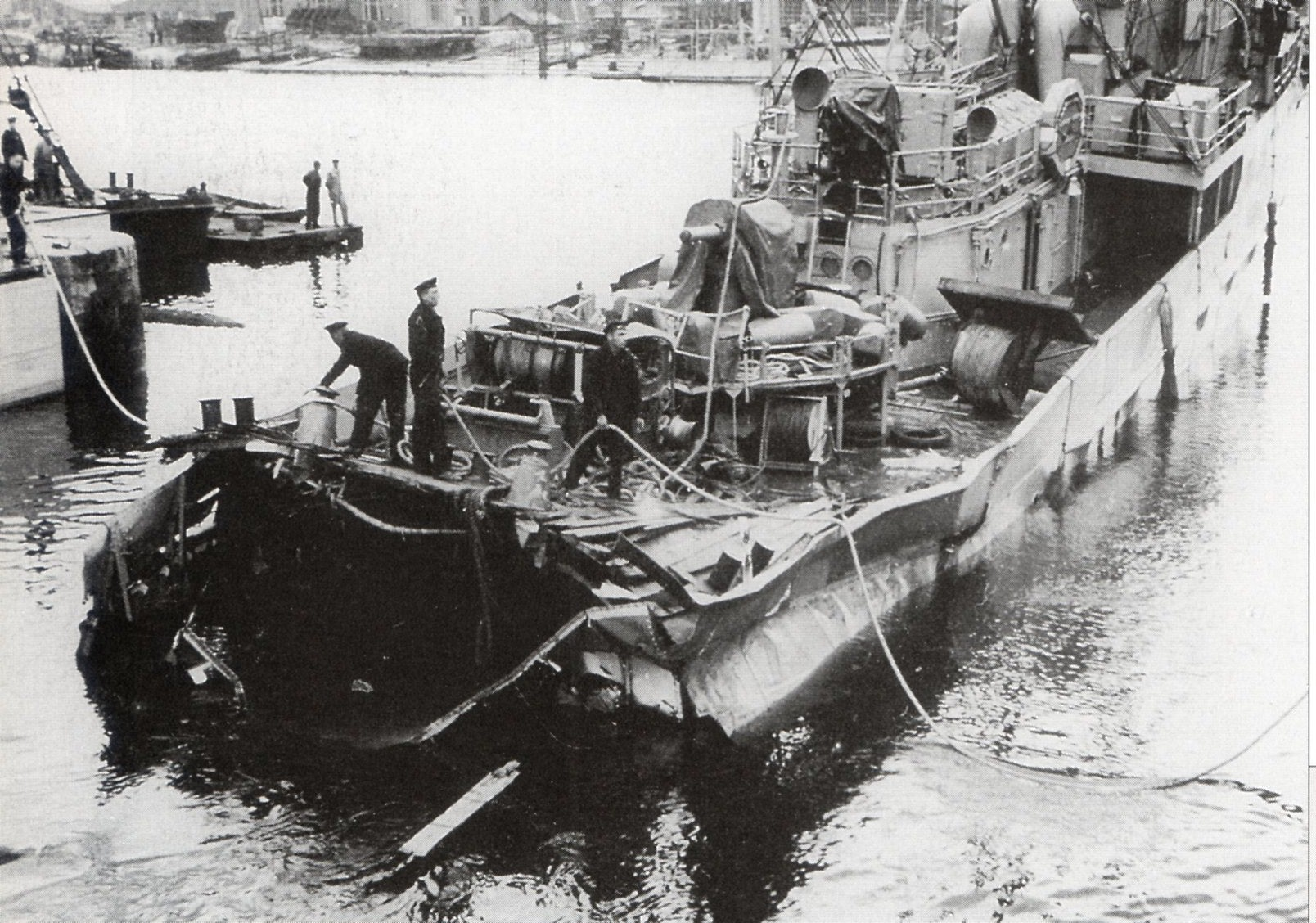
Abraham van der Hulst after she had struck a mine on 8 October 1939

HNLMS Abraham van der Hulst was a Jan van Amstel-class minesweeper built for the Royal Netherlands Navy in the 1930s. The German invasion of the Netherlands resulted in the ship being scuttled at Enkhuizen on 14 May 1940, but was raised by the Germans and entered service as the minesweeper M 553 with Nazi Germany's Kriegsmarine. The vessel was sunk by a mine off East Prussia on 21 April 1944. M 552 was raised on 20 July 1944 and towed to Stettin. There, the ship was bombed and burned out 20 August 1944. The wreck was captured by the Soviets. One source says she was returned to the Netherlands post war.

== Description ==
The Jan van Amstel-class ships were 55.8 metres (183 ft 1 in) long, with a beam of 7.8 metres (25 ft 7 in) and a draught of 2.2 metres (7 ft 3 in) at deep load. They displaced was 450 long tons (460 t) at normal load, which increased to 585 long tons (594 t) at deep load. A pair of Yarrow boilers fed steam to two triple-expansion steam engines that each drove a single propeller shaft. The engines were rated at 1,690 indicated horsepower (1,260 kW) which gave the ships a speed of 15 knots (28 km/h; 17 mph). They carried up to 110 long tons (110 t) of fuel oil and had a complement of 45 officers and ratings.

== Bibliography ==
- Gröner, Erich; Jung, Dieter; Maass, Martin (1991). U-boats and Mine Warfare Vessels. German Warships 1815–1945. Vol. 2. Translated by Thomas, Keith; Magowan, Rachel. London: Conway Maritime Press. ISBN 0-85177-593-4.
- Lenton, H.T. German Warships of the Second World War. London: Macdonald and Jane's, 1975. ISBN 0-356-04661-3.
- Roberts, John (1980). "The Netherlands". In Chesneau, Roger (ed.). Conway's All the World's Fighting Ships 1922–1946. Greenwich, UK: Conway Maritime Press. pp. 385–396. ISBN 0-85177-146-7.
- van Willigenburg, Henk (2010). Dutch Warships of World War II. Emmen: Lanasta. ISBN 978-90-8616-318-2.
