= List of minesweeper classes =

This is a list of minesweeper and minehunter classes

== Argentine Navy ==
- Ton-class minesweeper

== Royal Australian Navy ==
- Ton-class minesweeper
- Bay-class minehunter – (1986–2001)
- Huon-class minehunter – active

== Belgian Navy ==
- Aggressive-class minesweeper
- Tripartite-class minehunter
- Oostende-class minehunter

== Brazilian Navy ==
- Aratu-class minesweeper
- River-class minesweeper

== Bulgarian Navy ==
- Tripartite-class minehunter

== Royal Canadian Navy ==
- Fundy-class minesweeper
- Bangor-class minesweeper
- Algerine-class minesweeper
- Bay-class minesweeper
- Anticosti-class minesweeper
- Kingston-class coastal defence vessel (Active)

== People's Liberation Army Navy ==
- Wochi-class (Type 081) minehunter
- Wozang-class (Type 082II) minehunter
- Wolei-class minelayer
- Type 010 oceangoing minesweeper
- T-43-class oceangoing minesweeper
- Wosao-class (Type 082) minesweeper
- Type 529 minesweeper
- Fushun-class coastal minesweeper modified Shanghai II-class gunboat for minesweeping, all in reserve and being scrapped.
- Futi-class (Type 312) minesweeper / minesweeping drone
- Type 058 minesweeper
- Type 7102 minesweeper
- Type 057K minesweeper

== Danish Navy ==
- Flyvefisken-class patrol vessels (fitted for MCM operations)
- Holm-class multirole boats (fitted for remote controlled minesweeping)
- MSF-class drone minehunters
- MRD-class drone minehunters

== Egyptian Navy ==
- Yurka-class minesweeper
- Osprey-class minehunter

== Estonian Navy ==
- Sandown-class minehunter
- Lindau-class minehunter

== Finnish Navy ==
- Katanpää-class mine countermeasure vessel
- Kuha-class minesweeper (1941)
- Kuha-class minesweeper (1974)
- Kiiski-class minesweeper

== French Navy ==
- Navarin-class minesweeper, 12 built, 1918
- Tripartite-class minehunter, 40 built, 1977–1995

== German Navy ==
=== Kriegsmarine ===
- R boat
- M-class minesweeper

=== Volksmarine ===
- Kondor-class minesweeper

=== Bundesmarine ===
- Lindau-class minehunter
- Frankenthal-class minehunter
- Kulmbach-class mine hunter
- Ensdorf-class minesweeper
- Mühlhausen

== Greek Navy ==
- Hunt-class mine countermeasures vessel
- Osprey-class minehunter

== Indian Navy ==
- Pondicherry-class minesweeper
- Mahé-class minesweeper

== Indonesian Navy ==
- Pulau Rengat-class minehunter
- Pulau Rote-class minesweeper
- Pulau Fani-class minehunter

== Italian Navy ==
- Lerici-class minehunter
- Gaeta-class minehunter

== Japan Maritime Self-Defense Force ==
- Yaeyama-class minesweeper
- Awaji-class minesweeper

== Latvian Navy ==
- Tripartite-class minehunter

== Lithuanian Navy ==
- Lindau-class minehunter (2000-2020)
- Hunt-class mine countermeasures vessel (2006-active)

== Malaysian Navy ==
- Lerici-class minehunter

== Netherlands Navy ==
- A-class minesweeper
- M-class minesweeper
- Tripartite-class minehunter
- Vlissingen-class minehunter

== Nigerian Navy ==
- Lerici-class minehunter

== Norwegian Navy ==
- Aggressive-class minesweeper
- Sauda-class mine countermeasures vessel
- Alta-class minesweeper
- Oksøy-class mine hunter

== Pakistan Navy ==
- Tripartite-class minehunter

== Polish Navy ==
- T43-class minesweeper
- Projekt 206FM-class minehunter

== Russian Navy / Soviet Navy ==
- Alexandrit-class minesweeper
- Gorya-class minesweeper
- K-8-class minesweeper
- Natya-class minesweeper
- Sasha-class minesweeper
- Sonya-class minesweeper
- T43-class minesweeper
- T58-class minesweeper
- Vanya-class minesweeper
- Yevgenya-class minesweeper
- Yurka-class minesweeper
- Zhenya-class minesweeper

== Royal Saudi Navy ==
- Sandown-class minehunter

== South African Navy ==
- Ton-class minesweeper
- Lindau-class minehunter

== Spanish Navy ==
- Segura-class mine countermeasures vessel

== Singapore Navy ==
- Bedok-class mine countermeasures vessel

== Swedish Navy ==
- Landsort-class mine countermeasures vessel
- Styrsö-class mine countermeasures vessel

== Turkish Navy ==
- A-class minehunter

== Royal Navy (United Kingdom) ==
- Flower-class sloop (112 ships in 4 sub-classes, launched 1914—1918) convoy sloops intended originally for minesweeping
- Hunt-class minesweeper, Belvoir group (20 ships, launched 1916—1917) Ailsa twin-screw coastal minesweeping sloops
- Hunt-class minesweeper, Aberdare group (87 ships, launched 1917—1919) Admiralty twin-screw coastal minesweeping sloops
- Dance-class minesweeper (14 ships, launched 1917–1919) tunnel-screw coastal minesweeping sloops
- Racecourse-class minesweeper (32 ships in 2 sub-classes, launched 1916—1918) paddlewheel coastal minesweeping sloops
- Halcyon-class minesweeper (7 reciprocating and 14 turbine ships, launched 1933—1939) twin-screw minesweeping sloops
- Bangor-class minesweeper (14 ships, launched 1940—1942) diesel twin-screw single-role minesweeping sloops
- Blyth-class minesweeper (Bangor class II) (19 ships, launched 1940—1943) reciprocating Bangor variant
- Ardrossan-class minesweeper (Bangor class III) (26 ships, launched 1940—1942) turbine Bangor variant
- Bathurst-class corvette (47 ships, launched 1940—1943 only served with the Royal Australian Navy and Royal Indian Navy) Australian Bangor variant
- MMS-class minesweeper (403 ships, launched 1940—1945) inshore acoustic / magnetic motor minesweepers
- Algerine-class minesweeper (98 ships, launched 1941—1945) twin-screw multi-role minesweeping sloops
- Catherine-class minesweeper (22 ships, transferred from the US Navy in 1941 under the Lend-Lease program) twin-screw multi-role minesweeping sloops
- BYMS-class minesweeper (150 ships, launched 1941—1943) British Yard acoustic / magnetic motor minesweepers
- Ton-class minesweeper (116 ships, launched 1952—1959) open-water minesweepers, minehunters and mine countermeasures vessels
- Ham-class minesweeper (93 ships, launched 1954—1959) inshore minesweepers
- Ley-class minehunter (10 ships, launched 1952—1955) inshore minehunters
- Wilton class (1 ship, launched 18 January 1972) open-water minesweeper and minehunter. Prototype ship built in Glass Reinforced Plastic (GRP) to same hull design as Ton class and forerunner of Hunt and Sandown classes also constructed in GRP.
- Hunt-class mine countermeasures vessel (13 ships, launched 1978—1988) mine countermeasures vessels
- Venturer-class minesweeper (2 ships, purchased 1979) deep-water single-role minesweepers
- River-class minesweeper (12 ships, launched 1982—1985) deep-water single-role minesweepers
- Sandown-class minehunter (12 ships, launched 1990—2001) single-role minehunters

== United States Navy ==
=== World War II ===
United States Navy minesweepers in World War II can be put into 4 groups. First there were the 49 WW1-era Lapwings. Most of them were reclassified to serve as tugs, seaplane tenders and rescue ships.

The second group comprised the steel hull 2 Raven, 71 Auks and 123 Admirables that were conceptually similar to submarine chasers (PC-461-class and PCE-842-class). They were ocean-going, but their primary area of operation was coastal waters. They carried substantial anti-submarine warfare equipment: depth charges, depth charge throwers and hedgehogs and with this they could fulfill merchant escort duties. The 18 Adroits were PCE-842 boats built as minesweepers, but considered unsatisfactory for their purpose and converted to regular patrol craft. Several Auks were given to the Royal Navy, numerous Admirables to the Soviet Union. The Ravens were the first new minesweepers after a gap of almost 2 decades and they were the first to use diesel propulsion. The Auks used diesel-electric propulsion, because the availability of electrical energy removed the need for additional service generators. At over 3000shp they were also quite powerful and thus relatively fast. The Admirables again used geared diesels, they were considerably shorter than the Auks and only had half the power, but they came with lower cost. The Auk and Admirable classes were produced in parallel and their hull numbers overlap.

The third group was formed by the 481 wooden hull YMS-1-class minesweepers, similar in size and construction to the wooden hull SC-497-class submarine chasers. Wooden hulls were especially useful for minesweepers for it virtually eliminated the magnetic signature of the boat. These boats were smaller than their steel hull counterparts, were (probably) not going to cross the ocean under their own power and seakeeping fortunes and had no hedgehogs and only 2 depth charge throwers.

The fourth group consisted of 24 Gleaves-class destroyers that were converted relatively late in the war, but which were much faster and also better armed than any of the other minesweepers, even after the reduction in armament that came with the conversion.

The 3 Hawk were converted fishing boats and they are pretty much irrelevant because of the small quantity and lack of impact on design.

In alphabetical order.

- Admirable-class minesweeper
- Adroit-class minesweeper
- Aggressive-class minesweeper
- Auk-class minesweeper
- Avenger-class mine countermeasures ship – active
- Hawk-class minesweeper
- Kite-class minesweeper
- Lapwing-class minesweeper
- Littoral combat ship (LCS) with mine countermeasures module (MCM) – active and future
- Osprey-class minehunter
- YMS-1-class minesweeper

== Vietnam People's Navy ==
- Yurka-class minesweeper
- Sonya-class minesweeper
- Yevgenya-class minesweeper
