= Annapolis (disambiguation) =

Annapolis is the capital of the U.S. state of Maryland.

Annapolis may also refer to:

== Places ==
=== United States ===
- The United States Naval Academy, in Annapolis, Maryland
- Annapolis Junction, Maryland, an unincorporated community in Howard County
- Annapolis, California, an unincorporated locality in Sonoma County
- Annapolis, Illinois, an unincorporated community in Crawford County
- Annapolis, Indiana, an unincorporated community in Parke County
- Annapolis, Missouri, a town in Iron County
- Annapolis, Ohio, an unincorporated community in Jefferson County

=== Canada ===
- Annapolis (federal electoral district), a defunct federal electoral district in Nova Scotia
- Annapolis (provincial electoral district), a current provincial electoral district in Nova Scotia
- Annapolis County, Nova Scotia, a county in the province of Nova Scotia
- Annapolis Royal, Nova Scotia, a town in Annapolis county
- Annapolis Valley, spanning Annapolis, Digby and Kings county; containing the Annapolis River

=== Brazil ===
- Anápolis, a city in Goiás

== Films ==
- Annapolis (1928 film), a 1928 silent film drama
- Annapolis (2006 film), set at the US Naval Academy

== Events and organizations ==
- Annapolis Conference, a Middle East peace conference held in 2007
- Annapolis Convention (1774–1776), the Revolutionary War government of Maryland
- Annapolis Convention (1786), which led to the Philadelphia Constitutional Convention of 1787

== Vessels ==
- USS Annapolis, any one of four ships of the U.S. Navy named for Annapolis, Maryland, most recently the Los Angeles-class submarine USS Annapolis
- Annapolis-class destroyer, a class of helicopter destroyers in Royal Canadian Navy service
- The commercial trawler Annapolis, built in 1937, which became the USS Merganser

== Other uses ==
- Annapolis, a genus of spiders, with the sole species Annapolis mossi
- Annapolis (horse), an American thoroughbred horse
- NSS Annapolis, a transmitter station operated by the US Navy
