= Class 8 =

Class 8 may refer to:

== Ships ==
- 8 Metre (keelboat), a class of racing yacht
  - Beneteau First Class 8, a keelboat
- K-8-class minesweeper, a defensive naval vessel
- Type C8-class ship, a type of Heavy Lift Barge Carrier

== Railways ==
=== India ===
- Indian locomotive class WAG-8, a Co'Co' electric locomotive
- Indian locomotive class WDS-8, a Bo'Bo' diesel locomotive

=== Norway ===
- NSB Class 8, a standard-gauge steam locomotive
- NSB Class VIII, a narrow-gauge steam locomotive
- NSB El 8, a 1'Do1' electric locomotive
- NSB Di 8, Bo'Bo' a diesel locomotive
- TT Class 8, a tram in Trondheim, Norway

=== Prussia ===
- Prussian G 8, an 0-8-0 steam locomotive
- Prussian G 8.1, an 0-8-0 steam locomotive
- Prussian P 8, a 4-6-0 steam locomotive

=== United Kingdom ===
- British Railways
  - British Rail Class 08, a C diesel shunting engine
  - BR Standard Class 8, a 4-6-2 steam locomotive
- G&SWR 8 Class 2-4-0, a Glasgow & South Western Railway steam locomotive
- Great Central Railway
  - GCR Class 8, a 4-6-0 steam locomotive
  - GCR Class 8A, an 0-8-0 steam locomotive
  - GCR Class 8B, a 4-4-2 steam locomotive
  - GCR Classes 8D and 8E, a 4-4-2 steam locomotive
  - GCR Class 8F, a 4-6-0 steam locomotive
  - GCR Class 8H, an 0-8-4T steam locomotive
  - GCR Class 8K, a 2-8-0 steam locomotive
  - GCR Class 8N, a 4-6-0 steam locomotive
- L&YR Class 8, a Lancashire & Yorkshire Railway 4-6-0 steam locomotive
- LMS Stanier Class 8F, a London, Midland & Scottish Railway 2-8-0 steam locomotive
- LNER Class A8, a London & North Eastern Railway 4-6-2T steam locomotive
- LSWR C8 class, a London & South Western Railway 4-4-0 steam locomotive

=== United States ===
- Chesapeake and Ohio class H-8, an articulated 2-6-6-6 steam locomotive
- Pennsylvania Railroad class H8, a 2-8-0 steam locomotive
- Southern Pacific class AC-8, a cab-forward articulated 4-8-8-2 steam locomotive

=== Elsewhere ===
- South African Class 8A 4-8-0, a steam locomotive

== Other ==
- HAZMAT Class 8 Corrosive substances
- SCORE Class 8, an off-road racing classification
- Class 8 truck, an American truck class

== See also ==
- Class 08 (disambiguation)
