= German minehunter Datteln =

German Navy vessel

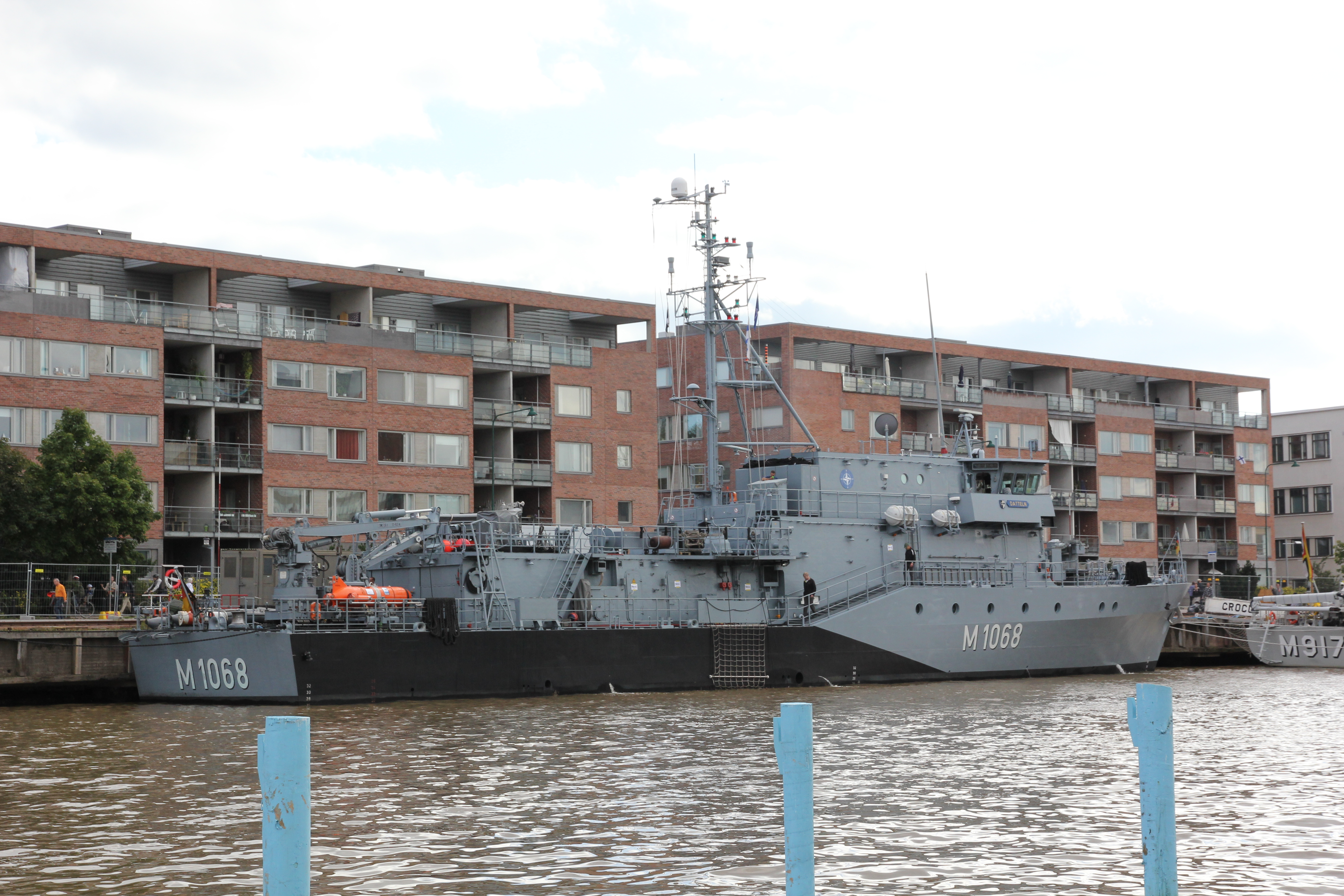
- Datteln at Turku, Finland during the Northern Coasts exercise on 31 August 2014

History

Germany
- Name: Datteln
- Namesake: Datteln, North Rhine-Westphalia, Germany
- Ordered: September 1988
- Builder: Lürssen
- Launched: 27 January 1994
- Commissioned: 8 December 1994
- Status: Active

General characteristics
- Class & type: Type 332 Frankenthal-class minehunter
- Displacement: 590 t (580 long tons) (standard); 650 t (640 long tons) (full load)
- Length: 54.4 m (178 ft 6 in)
- Beam: 9.2 m (30 ft 2 in)
- Draught: 2.6 m (8 ft 6 in)
- Propulsion: 2 × 2,240 kW (3,000 hp) diesel engines 2 × electric motors for slow maneuvering 2 × controllable pitch propellers
- Speed: 18 knots (33 km/h; 21 mph)
- Complement: 40–45
- Sensors & processing systems: DSQS-11M mine hunting sonar; SPS-64 radar
- Armament: 1 × 27 mm (1.1 in) MLG 27 (Bofors 40 mm automatic gun L/70 before refit); 2 × 7.62 mm (0.3 in) MG3; 2 × FIM-92 Stinger surface-to-air missiles; 20 Bottom/moored naval mines; 28 counter mine charges
- Notes: Has Penguin B3 mine hunting ROVs

Datteln is a Frankenthal-class minehunter of the German Navy. Datteln was the 7th of 12 other Frankenthal-class ships in September 1988. Datteln was launched on 27 January 1994 and commissioned on 8 December 1994. Datteln is the namesake of Datteln, a town in North Rhine-Westphalia.

== Career ==
On 12 January 2021 Datteln left Kiel to join Standing NATO Mine Countermeasures Group 1 (SNMCMG 1). Datteln performed historical ordnance disposal operations near the coast of Lolland, and Langeland, Denmark, assisting in the removal of historical explosive devices (leftover naval mines from World War II) and in identifying an historic "mine line." Datteln returned to its home port of Kiel on 14 April 2021.

Datteln participated in the Baltic Mine Countermeasures Exercise (BMXI/24) from 3 November to 21 March 2024.

On 11 January 2025 Datteln left the port of Kiel to join Standing NATO Mine Countermeasures Group 1 (SNMCMG 1). BALTOPS and OPEN SPIRT exercises will be performed in the Baltic Sea. Datteln, along with the rest of (SNMCMG 1) and Standing NATO Maritime Group 1 (SNMG 1) will also ensure underwater infrastructure in the Baltic Sea is safe. This is after the tanker called the Eagal S dragged its anchor across an underwater cable which linked Finland and Estonia. Datteln will use its sonar and ROVs to detect for damage on underwater cables in the Baltic Sea.
