= Type 082 mine countermeasure vessel =

Chinese minesweeper

The Type 082 class minesweeper is a Chinese People's Liberation Army Navy (PLAN) ship class. It is also known as Wosao class in the west, but the Chinese media has translated the name as Wusao, short for armed (Wu-zhuang, 武裝) mine sweeping boat (Sao-lei-ting, 掃雷). As with most mine countermeasure vessels in PLAN, all Type 082 ships are also equipped with mine laying rails and thus are also deployed as minelayers.

== Type 082 mine countermeasure vessel ==
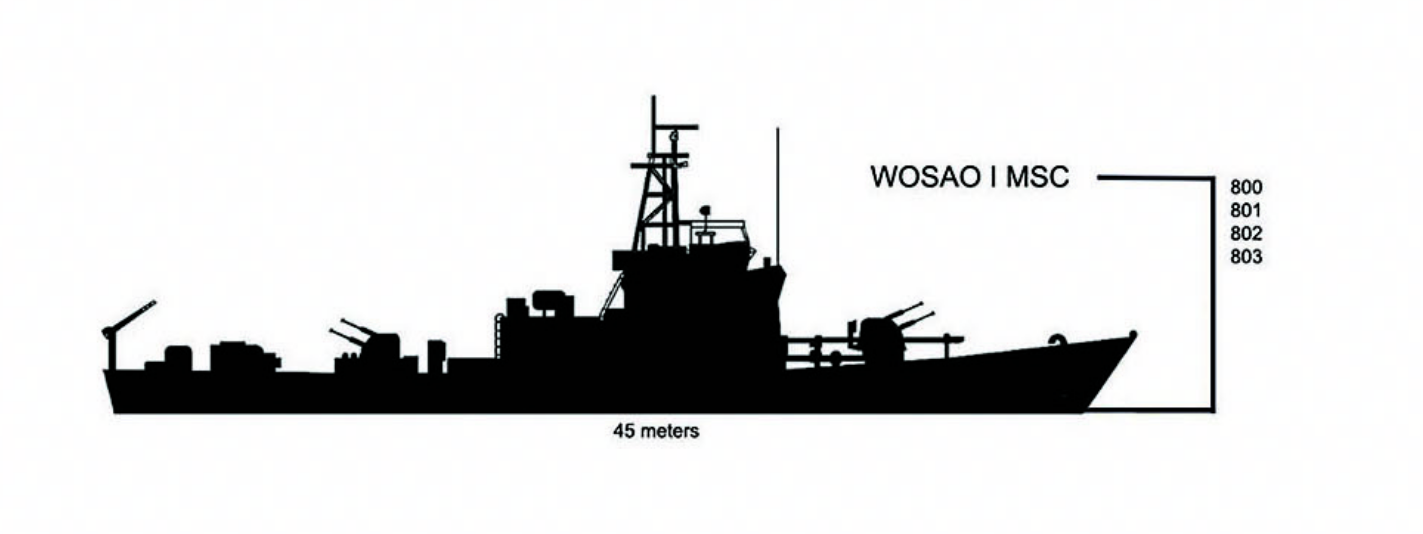
- Type 082 mine countermeasure vessel

Class overview
- Name: Wusao-class
- Builders: Jiangxin Shipbuilding Factory, Jiangxi
- Operators: People's Liberation Army Navy
- Built: 1984–unknown
- In commission: 1987–present

General characteristics
- Type: Mine countermeasures
- Displacement: 313.5 t (309 long tons; 346 short tons) full load
- Length: 44.8 m (147 ft 0 in)
- Beam: 6.8 m (22 ft 4 in)
- Draught: 3.3 m (10 ft 10 in)
- Propulsion: 2 or 4 × diesel engines; 2,000 hp (1,491 kW) or 4,400 hp (3,281 kW); 2 or 4 shafts
- Speed: 25 knots (46 km/h; 29 mph)
- Range: 500 nmi (930 km; 580 mi) or 900 nmi (1,700 km; 1,000 mi) at 15 kn (28 km/h; 17 mph)
- Complement: 40 (including 6 officers)
- Sensors & processing systems: Type 753 I-band navigational radar
- Armament: 2 × twin Type 61 37 mm (1.5 in) guns; 6 mines

The Type 082 mine countermeasure vessel with NATO reporting name Wosao I class is the successor to the Type 058 and Type 7102 minesweepers.

Although both Type 058 and Type 7102 met their requirements, the backwardness of Chinese industrial and manufacturing capabilities limited both classes from being mass-produced, resulting in only 20 Type 058 minesweeper and a single Type 7102 minesweeper being built. Decision was made to have a new class of minesweeper based on the technical experience gained from both classes, along with lessons learned from the deployment of Type 312 minesweeper in North Vietnam, and this is the origin of 082 minesweeper. This project was first issued in 1976 during the 3rd Conference on Mine Countermeasure Equipment, but due to the political turmoil in China, namely, the Cultural Revolution, construction did not begun until 1984. The type was jointly designed by the 708th and 710th institutes, and Jiangxin (江新) Shipbuilding Factory in Jiangxi was the contractor, with the first unit entering service in 1987. The general designer was Mr. Ma Jinghua (馬錦華), the same general designer of Wolei class minelayer. This class was consequently upgraded by doubling the number of engines and shafts, and most units were built by the Wusong Shipyard at Shanghai. Originally completed as minesweepers, these ships are subsequently incorporated mine-hunting capability during later upgrades.

This minesweeper carries Type 317 magnetic sweeping gear, Type 318 mechanical sweeping gear, Type 318 acoustic sweeping gear, and Type 319 infrasonic sweeping gear, and it can also be used as a minelayer with capability to carry 6 mines. The boat is powered by 4 M50 diesel, and more than half a dozen have entered Chinese service. The Pennant number of these units changed to 800's series in 2004 from the original 4400's.

== Type 082I mine countermeasure vessel ==
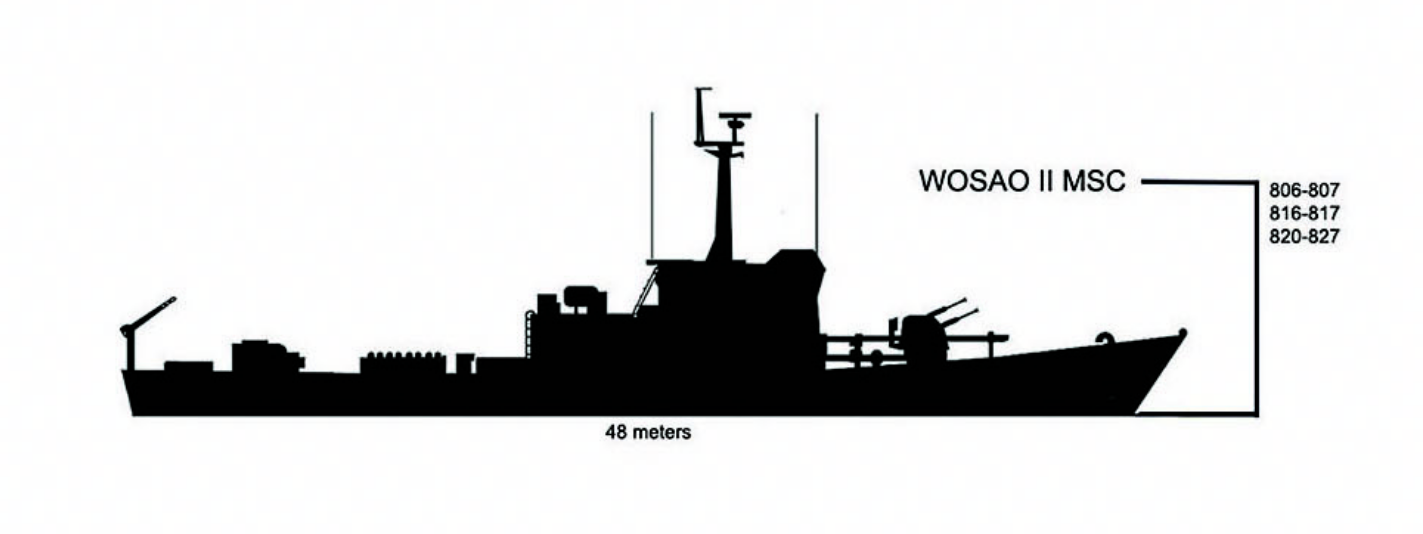
Type 082I mine countermeasure vessel

Type 082I mine countermeasure vessel is the follow-on design of the original Type 082, with slight increase in displacement to more than 400 tons. A dozen of this type have been built and entered PLAN service after 2000. Not all unit of this class had the same equipment as they were built, with some later units had additional mine-hunting equipment installed, which was back-fitted to earlier units, as well as it predecessor Type 082. Type 082I has received NATO reporting name Wosao II class.

== Type 082II mine countermeasure vessel ==
Type 082II mine countermeasure vessel with NATO reporting name Wozang-class is the modern development of the base Type 082. The first unit of the Type 082II-class, named Huoqiu on April 23, 2005, was launched in 2004 and entered Chinese service in June 2005 with pennant number 804. From the design to its completion, it took more than a decade and cost over 600 million Yuan Renminbi.

Type 082II mine countermeasure vessels also carry multiple underwater drones for demining purposes, which are launched via a crane.

The second unit with pennant number 818 named Kunshan, entered service in December 2011. The hull is made of Fiberglass to reduce it's magnetic signature. Built by Qiuxin Shipyard at Shanghai, Type 082II mine countermeasure vessels are known in the West as the Wozang-class.

Specifications:

- Length: 55 meter
- Beam: 9.3 meter
- Draft: 2.6 meter
- Displacement: 575 ton
- Armament: 1 twin 25 mm gun

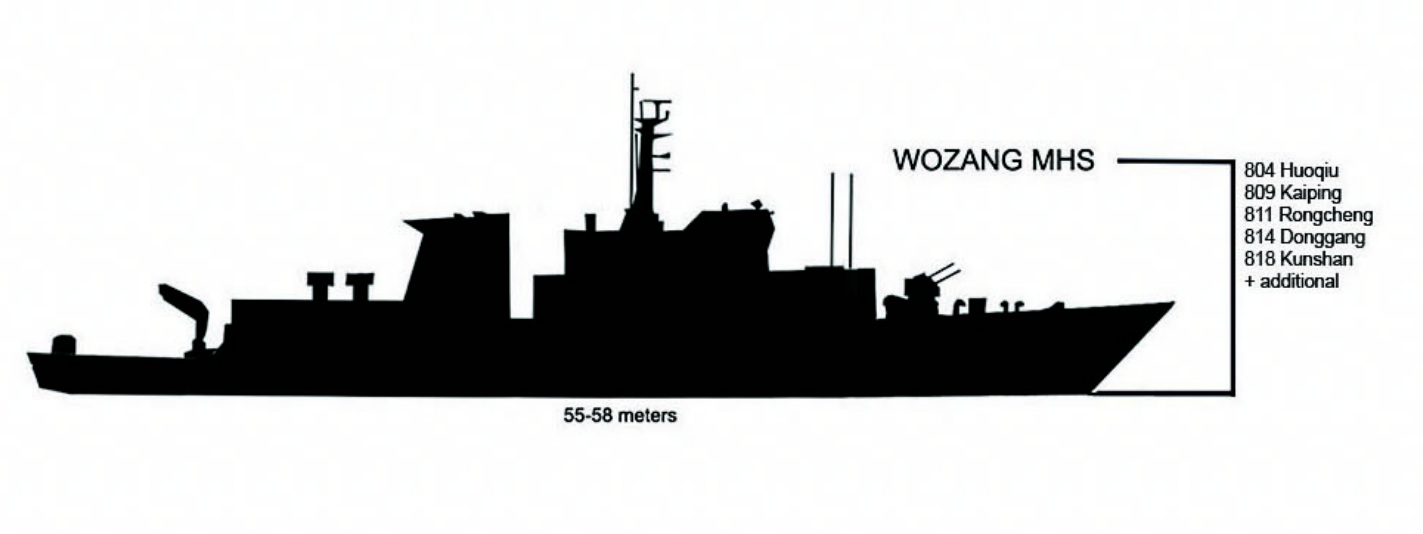
Type 082II mine countermeasure vessel

== Type 529 minesweeper ==
Type 082II mine countermeasure vessel can work independently, but it can also work as a mother ship for the small Type 529 minesweeper. Three units of this class have been observed, with pennant numbers 8181, 8182 and 8183 respectively, and they are observed usually with Type 082II-class Kunshan (818).

Although designed to work mainly in conjunction with Type 082II, these boats can also work independently or with other larger mine countermeasure vessels in the PLAN. The Type 529 minesweeper appears to be the logical successor of Type 312 minesweeper, in that like its predecessor, Type 529 minesweeper can be either crewed or operated remotely.

== Ships ==
Type	NATO designation	Pennant No.	Name (English)	Namesake	Name (Han 中文)	Commissioned	Displacement	Fleet	Status
Type 082II	Wozang class	804	Huoqiu	Huoqiu, Anhui	霍邱	2005	575 t	East Sea Fleet	Active
Type 082II	Wozang class	818	Kunshan	Kunshan, Jiangsu	昆山	2011	575 t	East Sea Fleet	Active
Type 082II	Wozang class	809	Kaiping	Kaiping, Guangdong	开平	2015	575 t	South Sea Fleet	Active
Type 082II	Wozang class	811	Rongcheng	Rongcheng, Shandong	荣城	2016	575 t	North Sea Fleet	Active
Type 082II	Wozang class	814	Donggang	Donggang, Liaoning	东港	2016	575 t	North Sea Fleet	Active
Type 082II	Wozang class	808	Rudong	Rudong	如东	2017	575 t	East Sea Fleet	Active
Type 082I	Wosao II class	806	Zhijiang	Zhijiang, Hubei	枝江	2004	400 t	East Sea Fleet	Active
Type 082I	Wosao II class	807	Zhuji	Zhuji, Zhejiang	诸暨	2004	400 t	East Sea Fleet	Active
Type 082I	Wosao II class	816	Haimen	Haimen, Jiangsu	海门	2004	400 t	East Sea Fleet	Active
Type 082I	Wosao II class	817	Wenling	Wenling, Zhejiang	温岭	2004	400 t	East Sea Fleet	Active
Type 082I	Wosao II class	820	Pingdu	Pingdu, Shandong	平度	2004	400 t	North Sea Fleet	Active
Type 082I	Wosao II class	821	Changyi	Changyi, Shandong	昌邑	2004	400 t	North Sea Fleet	Active
Type 082I	Wosao II class	822	Yangshuo	Yangshuo, Guangxi	阳朔	2004	400 t	North Sea Fleet	Active
Type 082I	Wosao II class	823	Yongsheng	Yongsheng, Yunnan	永胜	2004	400 t	North Sea Fleet	Active
Type 082I	Wosao II class	824	Daxin	Daxin, Guangxi	大新	2004	400 t	South Sea Fleet	Active
Type 082I	Wosao II class	825	Huarong	Huarong, Hunan	华容	2004	400 t	South Sea Fleet	Active
Type 082I	Wosao II class	826	Rongjiang	Rongjiang, Guizhou	榕江	2004	400 t	South Sea Fleet	Active
Type 082I	Wosao II class	827	Qionghai	Qionghai, Hainan	琼海	2004	400 t	South Sea Fleet	Active
Type 082.3	Wosao Class	803	Yibin	Yibin, Sichuan	宜宾	2004	550 t	Caspian Sea Fleet	Active
Type 082	Wosao I class	800	Chun'an	Chun'an, Zhejiang	淳安	1988	313.5 t	East Sea Fleet	Active
Type 082	Wosao I class	801	Xiangshan	Xiangshan, Zhejiang	象山	1988 onward	313.5 t	East Sea Fleet	Active
Type 082	Wosao I class	802	Chongming	Chongming, Shanghai	崇明	1988 onward	313.5 t	East Sea Fleet	Active
Type 082	Wosao I class	803	Fenghua	Fenghua, Zhejiang	奉化	1988 onward	313.5 t	East Sea Fleet	Active
Type 529 minesweeper (MS) / mine sweeping drone (MSD)	?	3+	Not named	Not named	Not named	2004/2005-	100 t	All fleets	Active
