= TCG Amasra =

TCG Amasra is the name of the following ships of the Turkish Navy:

- TCG Amasra (M 502), ex-HMAS Pirie (J189), a Bathurst-class corvette acquired in 1946, decommissioned in 1984
- TCG Amasra (M 266), an A-class minehunter commissioned in 2005

== See also ==
- Amasra
