= Pulau Fani-class minehunter =

Indonesian Navy mine countermeasure vessel class

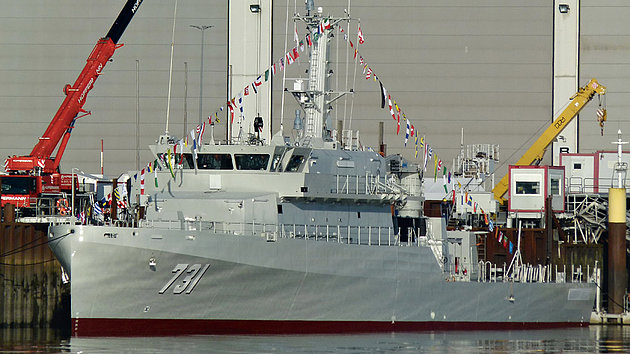
- KRI Pulau Fani (731)

Class overview
- Name: Pulau Fani class
- Builders: Abeking & Rasmussen, Lemwerder
- Operators: Indonesian Navy
- Preceded by: Pulau Rote class
- Subclasses: Frankenthal class
- Built: 2019–2023
- In commission: 2023–present
- Planned: 2
- Active: 2

General characteristics
- Class & type: Mine countermeasures vessel
- Displacement: 1,444 t (1,421 long tons)
- Length: 61.4 m (201 ft 5 in)
- Beam: 11.1 m (36 ft 5 in)
- Draft: 3.3 m (10 ft 10 in)
- Propulsion: 2 x MAN 12V175D-MM diesel engines, 2,220 kW (2,980 shp); 2 x controllable-pitch screws
- Speed: 18 knots (33 km/h; 21 mph)
- Boats & landing craft carried: 2 x 4 m RHIB
- Complement: 48
- Sensors & processing systems: SYNTACS C2 mine countermeasure suite; Synapsis NX navigation system
- Armament: 1 x Oerlikon Searanger 20 RWS; 2 x 9m SWATH mine hunting ROVs

The Pulau Fani class is a class of mine countermeasures vessels in service with the Indonesian Navy. Built by Abeking & Rasmussen, the class design is based on the Frankenthal-class minehunter.

== Characteristics ==
Ships of the class have a length of 61.4 m (201 ft 5 in), a beam of 11.1 m (36 ft 5 in) and draft of 3.3 m (10 ft 10 in). They have a displacement of 1,444 tonnes (1,421 long tons). The vessels are powered by two MAN 12V175D-MM diesel engines with each having 2,220 kW (2,980 shp) at 1,900 rpm, connected to MAN Alpha controllable-pitch twin screw-propeller system with Alphatronic 3000 propulsion-control system. The ships also has an AKA hybrid PTI pure electric system for silent minehunting operation. They have a maximum speed of 18 knots (33 km/h; 21 mph) and cruising speed of 10 knots (19 km/h; 12 mph). The ships hull was built with non-magnetic steel supplied from France. The class has a complement of 48 crew.

The Pulau Fani class is armed with a single 20 mm Oerlikon Searanger 20 remote weapon system. For mine hunting purpose, the class are equipped with two 9 meters optionally-crewed Small Waterplane Area Twin Hull (SWATH) vessels, a retractable multibeam echo sounder and degaussing system.

The class sensors and electronic suites includes SYNTACS C2 mine countermeasure suite and Synapsis NX navigation system.

The ships has a crane for lowering remotely operated vehicle (ROV) and underwater autonomous vehicle (UAV). The launch and recovery system for the SWATHs is located at the stern. They also carries two 4-meterr rigid-hulled inflatable boats.

== Ships in the class ==
Name	Hull no.	Builder	Launched	Commissioned	Status
Pulau Fani	731	Abeking & Rasmussen	12 October 2022	14 August 2023	Active
Pulau Fanildo	732	Abeking & Rasmussen	12 October 2022	14 August 2023	Active

== See also ==
- A-class minehunter
