= Frankenthal-class minehunter =

German minehunter class

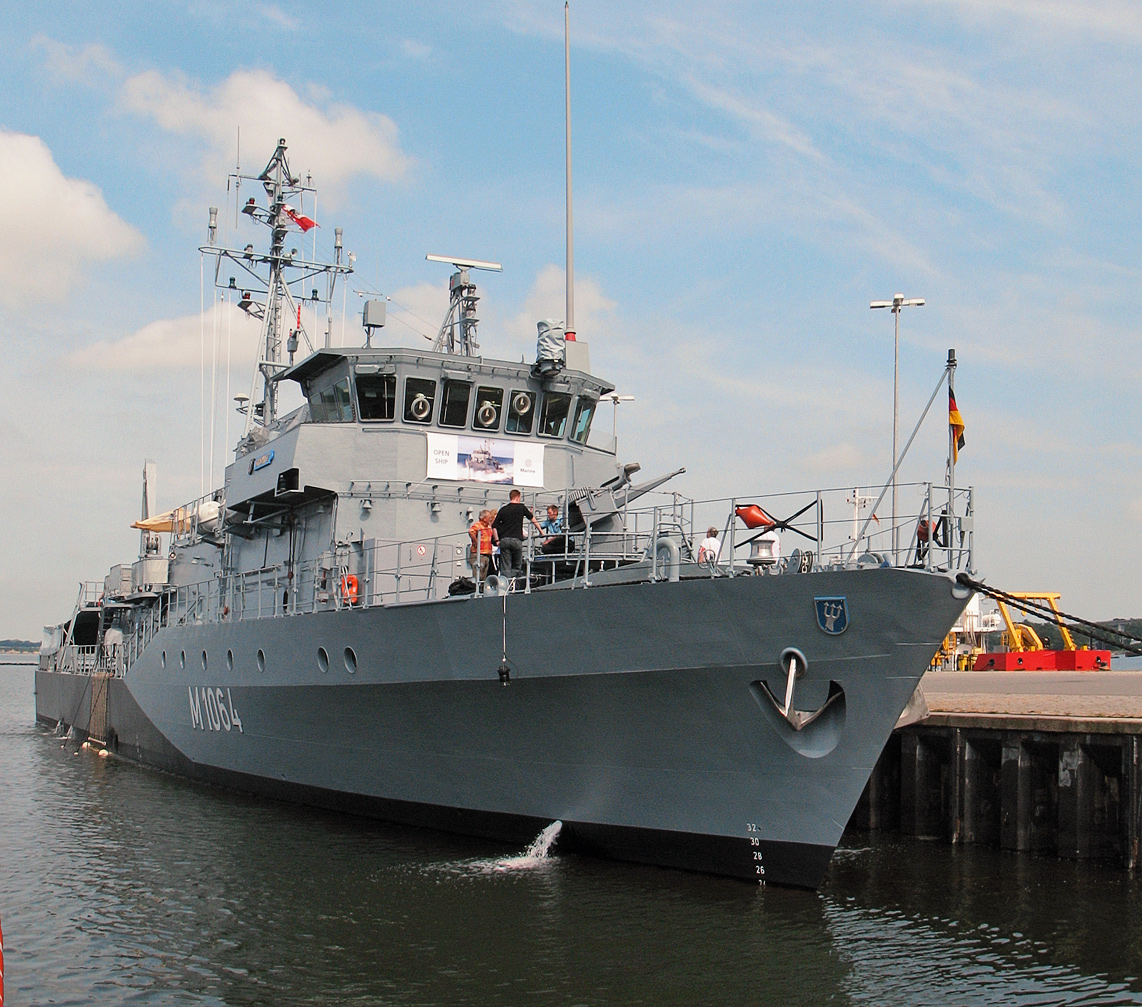
- Grömitz, already equipped with the MLG 27

Class overview
- Builders: Lürssen; Abeking & Rasmussen; Krögerwerft
- Operators: German Navy; United Arab Emirates Navy; Turkish Navy; Indonesian Navy
- Preceded by: Hameln-class minesweeper
- Subclasses: A class; Pulau Fani class
- In commission: 1992–present
- Planned: 12
- Completed: 12
- Active: 10
- Retired: 2

General characteristics
- Type: Minehunter
- Displacement: 650 t (640 long tons)
- Length: 54.4 m (178 ft 6 in)
- Beam: 9.2 m (30 ft 2 in)
- Draft: 2.6 m (8 ft 6 in)
- Propulsion: 2 × MTU 16V 538 TB91 diesel engines, 2040 kW each; 2 × electric motors for slow and silent maneuvering; 2 × Renk PLS 25 E gearboxes; 2 × controllable pitch propellers
- Speed: 18 knots (33 km/h; 21 mph)
- Complement: 41
- Sensors & processing systems: 1 × hull mounted DSQS-11A mine hunting sonar; DRBN 32 navigation radar
- Electronic warfare & decoys: 2 × TKWA/MASS (Multi Ammunition Softkill System) decoy launchers (currently under procurement); 2 × Barricade chaff and flare launcher
- Armament: 1 × Bofors 40 mm/L70 dual-purpose gun (currently upgrading to 1 × MLG 27 27 mm autocannon); 2 FIM-92 Stinger MANPADS surface-to-air missile; 2 × Pinguin B3 mine hunting ROVs; Mine laying capabilities
- Notes: mine diver equipment, decompression chamber; crane

The Type 332 Frankenthal-class minehunter is a class of minehunters of the German Navy. The ships are built of non-magnetic steel. The hull, machinery and superstructure of this class is similar to the original Type 343 Hameln-class minesweeper, but the equipment differs. The class forms the 3 Minesweeper Squadron of the German Navy. These function as mine countermeasures vessels. Two of these vessels contribute to the two Standing NATO Mine Countermeasures Groups SNMCG 1 and SNMCG 2.

Slightly modified Frankenthal-class minehunters are also operated by the Turkish Navy, where they are referred to as the A class. In the beginning of 2019, the Indonesian Navy ordered two minehunters based on a modified Frankenthal class, referred to as Pulau Fani class, with a length of 62 metres (203 ft 5 in).

== List of ships ==
All active German ships are currently stationed in Kiel at the Baltic Sea. Fulda, Weilheim, Sulzbach-Rosenberg, Dillingen, and Homburg are part of the 3. Minensuchgeschwader (3. mine sweeper squadron). The others belong to 5. Minensuchgeschwader. Weiden was sold to United Arab Emirates in 2006. As the German Navy closed the naval base at Olpenitz, all ships were relocated to Kiel and their squadrons incorporated into the Einsatzflottille 1 (Flotilla 1).

Pennant number	Name	Call sign	Shipyard	Commissioned	Decommissioned
M1066	Frankenthal	DREY	Lürssen	16 December 1992	Sold to UAE (now M02 Al Murjan)
M1060	Weiden	DRES	Abeking & Rasmussen	3 March 1993	Sold to UAE (now M01 Al Hasbah)
M1061	Rottweil	DRET	Krögerwerft	7 July 1993	Refitted to be used with the SEK-M
M1063	Bad Bevensen	DREV	Lürssen	9 December 1993	
M1067	Bad Rappenau	DREZ	Abeking & Rasmussen	19 April 1994	Refitted to be used with the SEK-M
M1064	Grömitz	DREW	Krögerwerft	23 August 1994	
M1068	Datteln	DRFA	Lürssen	8 December 1994	
M1065	Dillingen	DREX	Abeking & Rasmussen	25 April 1995	
M1069	Homburg	DRFB	Krögerwerft	26 September 1995	
M1062	Sulzbach-Rosenberg	DREU	Lürssen	23 January 1996	
M1058	Fulda	DRFC		5 June 1998	
M1059	Weilheim	DRFD		26 November 1998	

== Incidents ==
On 21 February 2007, Grömitz ran onto a reef in the Floro fjord while on tour in western Norway and remained stranded in a spectacular way until being salvaged.

In October 2018, the Iranian-backed Yemeni rebel group Ansar Allah released a video which included images that confirmed it sank one of the UAE Navy's Frankenthal class mine-countermeasures vessels in July 2017 in Al-Mukha. The video identified the vessel as Al-Qasnah and said it was attacked on 29 July 2017, which corresponds to a claim it made at the time that it had attacked an Emirati warship with a "suitable weapon".

=== Sabotage 2025 ===
An act of sabotage was discovered on the minehunter Weilheim when the ship was in the shipyard at Rostock in February 2025. Several cable harnesses were cut with an axe. The Tene shipyard in Rostock regularly maintains warships for the German Navy and the Federal Police.

This incident is part of a hybrid attack on the German Navy involving several acts of sabotage in January and February 2025, including against the corvette Emden and the German frigate Hessen. According to the Inspector of the Navy, in addition to sabotage attempts from land and sea, there were cases of intrusions into naval bases and "attempts to make contact" with soldiers in uniform on their way home.

Observers see these cases as Russian intelligence services using "disposable agents".

== Gallery ==
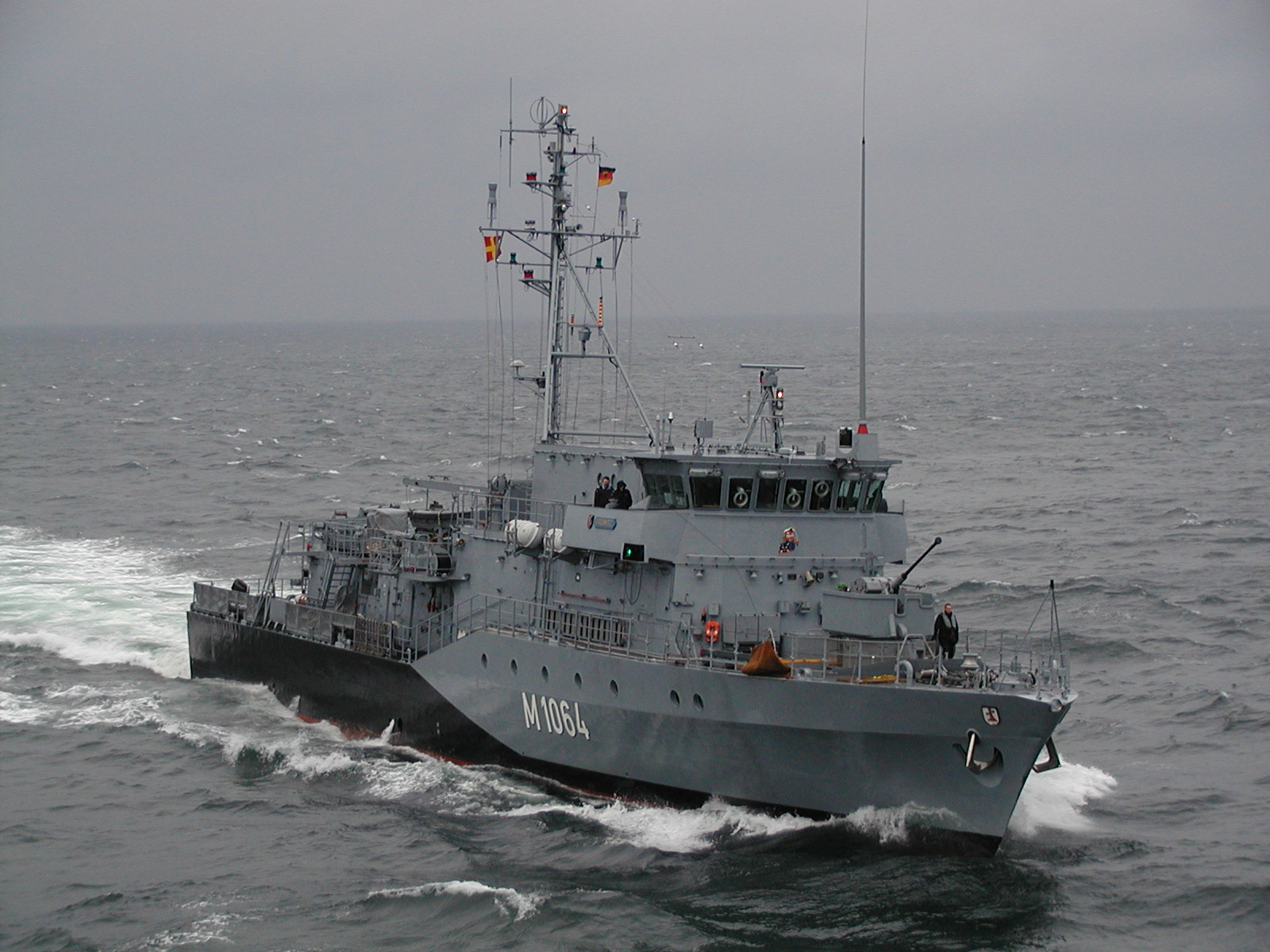
Grömitz

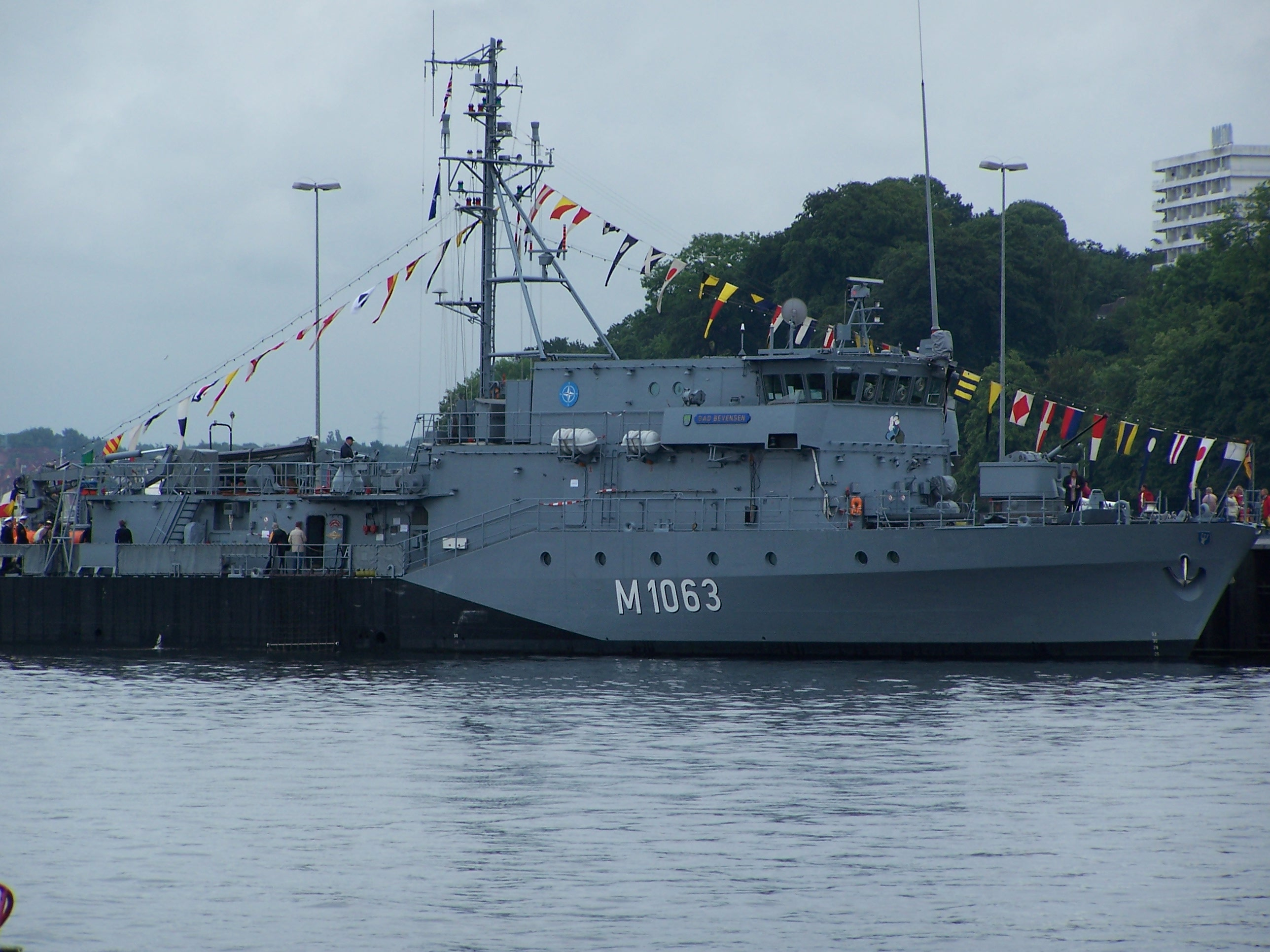
Bad Bevensen at the Kiel Week 2007

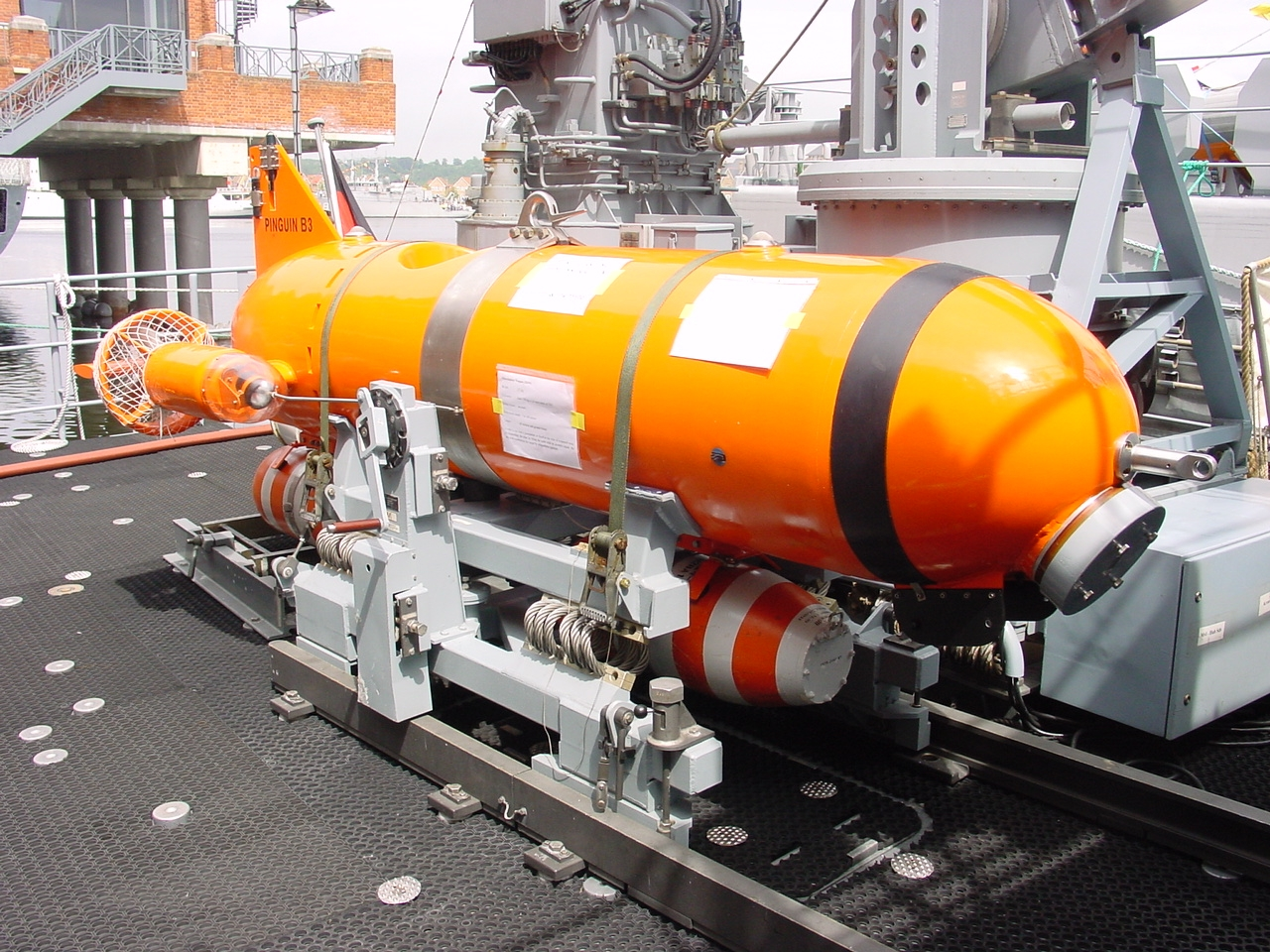
A Pinguin B3 mine-hunting ROV

== See also ==
Equivalent minehunters of the same era

- Avenger class
- Sandown class
- Alkmaar class
- Lerici class
- Landsort class
- Type 082
