= USS Captor =

Q-ship built in 1938

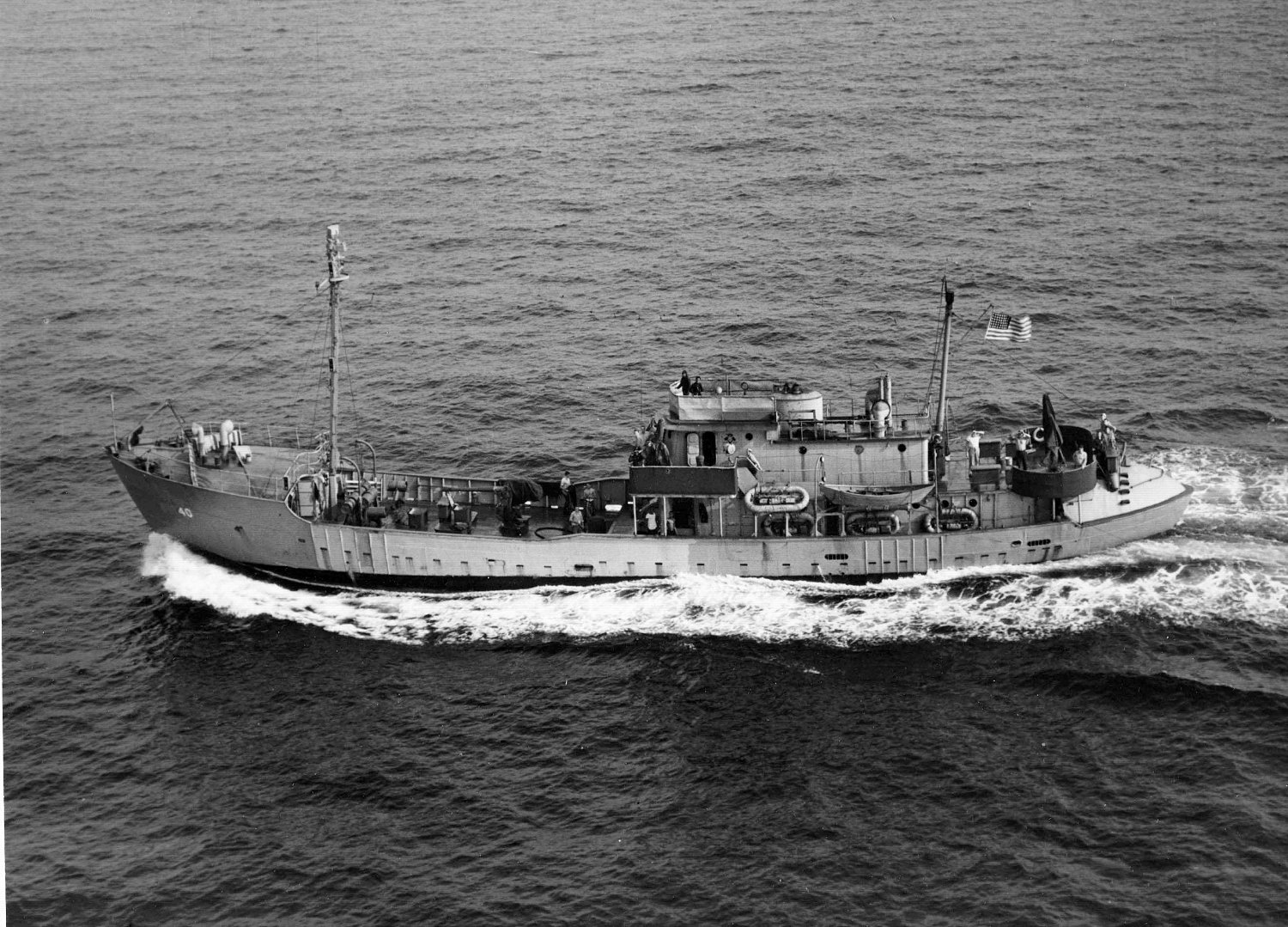
- Captor underway in August 1944

Class overview
- Preceded by: Auk class
- Succeeded by: Hawk class

History

United States
- Name: USS Captor
- Builder: Bethlehem Shipbuilding Corporation's Fore River Shipyard, Quincy, Massachusetts
- Launched: 1938
- Acquired: by US Navy, 1 January 1942
- Commissioned: 5 March 1942
- Decommissioned: 4 October 1944
- Reclassified: AM-132, 28 February 1942; PYc-40, 18 April 1942
- Stricken: 14 October 1944
- Identification: IMO number: 5386825; Callsign: WB4343
- Fate: Sold, 21 February 1945; In use as a fishing vessel as of 2009

General characteristics
- Type: Q-ship
- Displacement: 314 long tons (319 t)
- Length: 133 ft (41 m)
- Beam: 26 ft (7.9 m)
- Speed: 12.5 knots (23.2 km/h; 14.4 mph)
- Complement: 5 officers and 42 enlisted
- Armament: 1 × 4-inch/50-caliber gun; 2 × .50 cal (12.7 mm) machine guns; 4 × Depth charge throwers; 2 × .30-caliber Lewis guns

USS Captor (PYc-40), briefly the seventh ship to bear the name USS Eagle (AM-132), was a Q-ship of the United States Navy.

Built as Harvard, a steel-hulled trawler, in 1938 by Bethlehem Shipbuilding Corporation's Fore River Shipyard, Quincy, Massachusetts, and handed over to General Sea Foods Corporation, Boston, and put into service as Wave.

== Service history ==
=== Minesweeper ===
The fishing trawler was acquired by the Navy as part of the Auxiliary Vessels Act on 1 January 1942. Reporting to the Portsmouth Navy Yard in Kittery, Maine, the trawler began conversion to war service as a minesweeper on 8 January. With the work complete on 28 February, she was named Eagle, given the hull classification symbol AM-132, and placed in commission on 5 March 1942, with Lieutenant Commander Leroy E. Rogers, USNR, in command.

=== Q-ship ===
Along with Asterion (AK-100) and Atik (AK-101), Eagle was selected early to participate in a secret "Q-ship" program. The intention was to disguise the ship as a defenseless civilian vessel and, after luring an enemy submarine into close quarters on the surface, open fire with hidden guns and sink the unsuspecting U-boat. For this reason, Eagle remained at Portsmouth, where she underwent further conversion into a Q-ship and received weapons and sonar gear. During this second conversion, the minesweeper was renamed Captor and redesignated PYc-40 on 18 April. With alterations complete on 19 May, the vessel reported for duty with the 1st Naval District at Boston.

Unlike the other four ships eventually in the Q-ship program, Captor did not sail in convoys or along coastal shipping routes. Instead, she operated in the waters near Boston – in Massachusetts Bay, north to Casco Bay, east to the Georges Bank, and south to Nantucket Sound and Rhode Island Sound. While at sea, the disguised Q-ship also helped cover the coastal convoy routes coming north from New York. As growing air and sea patrols had driven most U-boats away from the New England coast in May 1942, Captor had little chance to spot an enemy submarine and ended her wartime career without a single sighting.

With the decline in the U-boat threat to the east coast of the United States late in the war, Captor was decommissioned at Boston on 4 October 1944. Stricken from the Naval Vessel Register on 14 October 1944, the trawler was transferred to the War Shipping Administration and sold on 21 February 1945.

In 1959, the ship was acquired for use as a fishing boat, and renamed Wave. She passed through several owners over the following decades while serving in this capacity. In 2005, she was acquired by R & J Shipping Inc and returned to her original name Harvard. She went out of documentation in 2009, with her final fate unknown.

As of 2005, no other ship in the United States Navy has been named Captor.
