= Class 08 =

Class 08 may refer to:

- British Rail Class 08
- PKP class EP08

== See also ==
- Class 8 (disambiguation)
