= USS Ibis (AM-134) =

Minesweeper of the United States Navy

History

United States
- Name: M/V Tide
- Namesake: The ibis
- Owner: General Sea Foods Corp., Boston, Massachusetts
- Builder: Bethlehem Steel, Quincy, Massachusetts
- Launched: 1937
- Fate: Requisitioned by the US Navy, 1 January 1942

United States
- Name: USS Ibis
- Acquired: 1 January 1942
- Commissioned: 23 May 1942
- Decommissioned: 1 May 1944
- Stricken: 16 September 1944
- Fate: Sold back to former owner

General characteristics as Minesweeper
- Class & type: Hawk-class minesweeper
- Displacement: 590 long tons (600 t)
- Length: 147 ft (45 m)
- Beam: 26 ft (7.9 m)
- Draft: 13 ft (4.0 m)
- Propulsion: Cooper Bessemer diesel engine, one shaft, 650 shp (485 kW)
- Speed: 12 knots (14 mph; 22 km/h)
- Armament: • 2 × 6-pounder guns

The second USS Ibis (AM-134), was a Hawk-class minesweeper of the United States Navy during World War II.

As the M/V Tide, a steel-hulled fishing trawler, she was built by the Bethlehem Shipbuilding Co., Quincy, Massachusetts, for the General Sea Foods Corp., Boston, Massachusetts, in 1937.

The vessel was acquired by the navy, on 1 January 1942, and conversion to a minesweeper began on 8 January 1942 at the Bethlehem Steel Corp., East Boston, Massachusetts. Renamed Ibis on 21 January 1942, she completed conversion and was commissioned on 23 May 1942.

Ibis was assigned to Woods Hole Section Base, Massachusetts, as a training ship until early 1943, when she took up minesweeping duties out of Newport, Rhode Island.

Ibis was decommissioned 1 May 1944. Her name was struck from the Navy List on 16 September 1944 and she transferred to the Maritime Commission. She was subsequently sold back to the General Foods Corporation.
