= Landsort-class mine countermeasures vessel =

1983 Swedish and Singaporean ship class

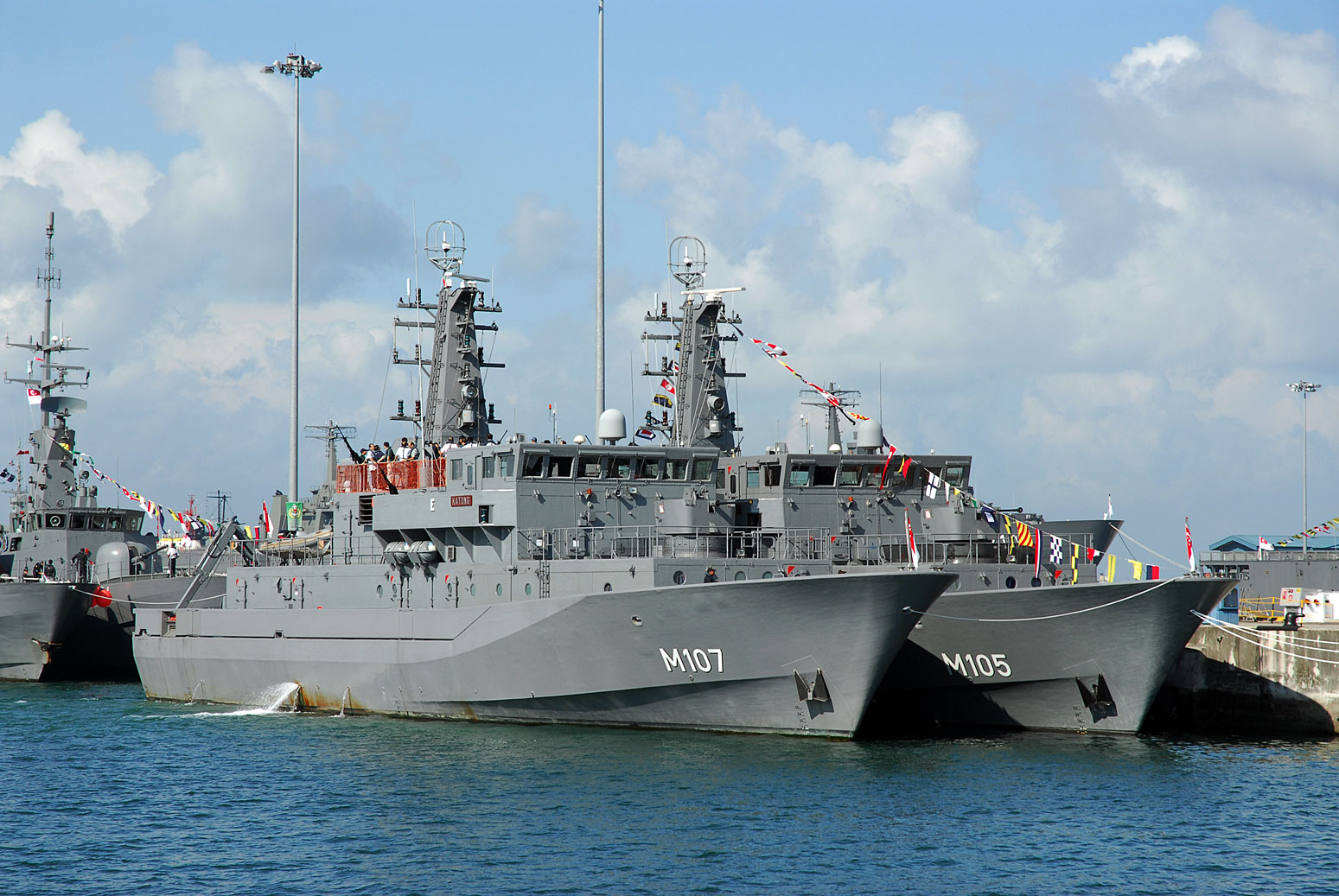
- Bedok-class MCMVs berthed at Changi Naval Base during the Navy Open House 2007

Class overview
- Name: Landsort
- Operators: Swedish Navy; Republic of Singapore Navy
- Subclasses: Bedok class; Koster class
- Completed: 11

General characteristics
- Type: mine countermeasures vessel
- Displacement: 270 tonnes (standard); 360 tonnes (full load)
- Length: 47.5 m (155 ft 10 in)
- Beam: 9.6 m (31 ft 6 in)
- Draught: 2.3 m (7 ft 7 in)
- Installed power: Two 225 kVA, one 135 kVA
- Propulsion: Four Saab Scania DSI 14 diesel engines, coupled to two Voith Schneider Propellers
- Speed: 15 knots (28 km/h)
- Range: 2,000 nautical miles (4,000 km) at 12 knots (22 km/h)
- Sensors & processing systems: Navigation radar: Terma Electronic I-band navigation radar; Sonar: Thales Underwater System TSM-2022 hull-mounted mine hunting sonar; EOD: Saab Systems 9LV 100 optronic weapon director
- Electronic warfare & decoys: ESM: Thales Matilda radar warning system; Decoys: Saab Systems Philax decoy launchers
- Armament: Gun: 40 mm lvakan M/48; Anti-submarine: Saab anti-submarine mortar launchers

The Landsort-class mine countermeasures vessel were built by Swedish shipbuilding company, Kockums (formerly Karlskronavarvet) for the Swedish Navy and the Republic of Singapore Navy (RSN) between 1983 and 1996.

== Design ==
As a mine countermeasure vessel, the hull is made out of glass-reinforced plastic in order to lower acoustic and magnetic signatures, as well as provide improved shock resistance to underwater explosions.

The Landsort class is equipped for mine sweeping with both conventional mechanical sweeping gear as well as electric and acoustic sweep systems. Mine hunting capability is provided by remotely operated vehicles (ROVs) from Saab Underwater Systems, such as the Double Eagle.

=== Bedok class ===
The Bedok class of the Republic of Singapore Navy is configured with the Thomson-CSF TSM 2061 Mk II mine hunting and mine disposal system, Thomson-CSF TSM 2022 hull-mounted high frequency sonar, two ECA PAP 104 Mk 5 ROVs, Signaal WM20 director, Norcontrol DB2000 navigation radar and Racal Precision Navigation System.

The vessels of the Bedok-class form the 194 Squadron of the RSN, under the Coastal Command.

=== Koster class ===
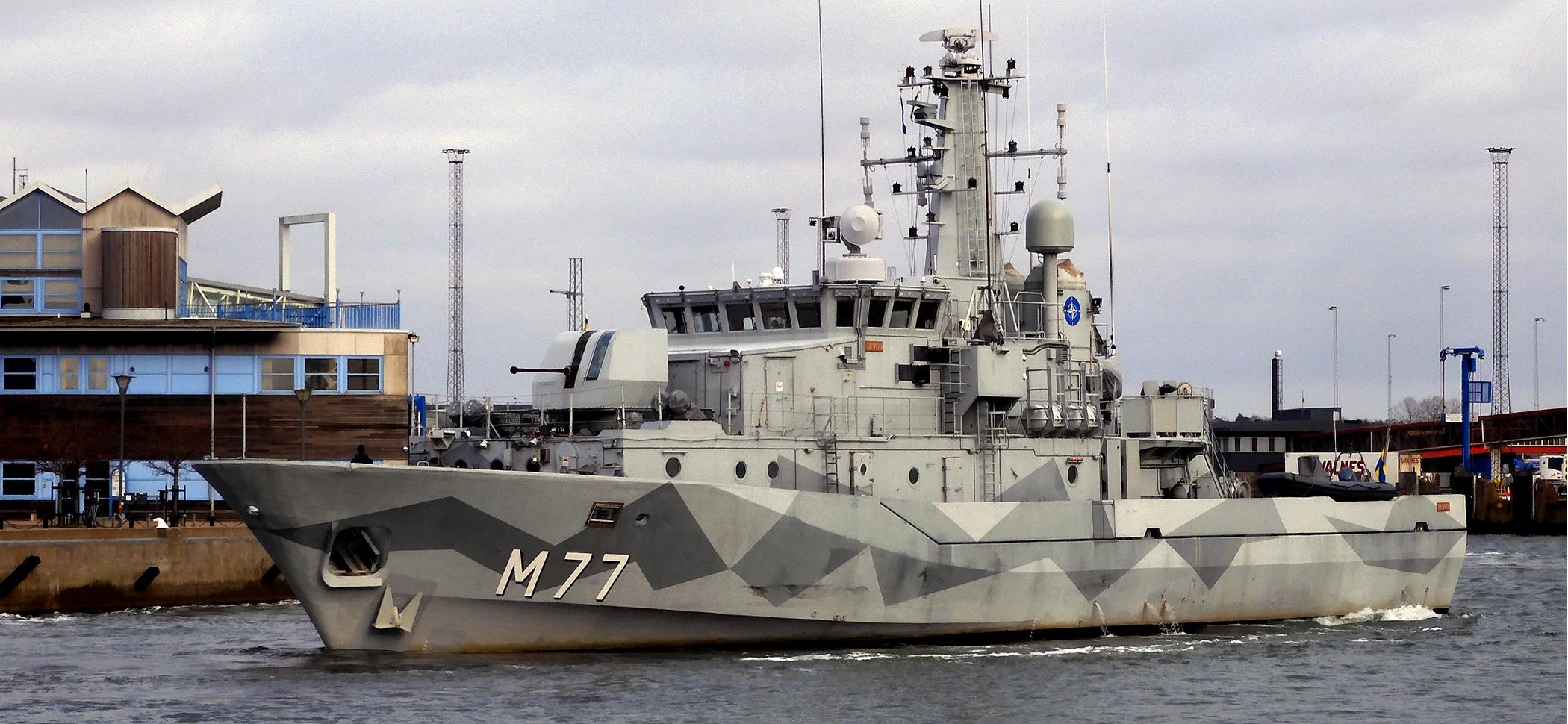
The Swedish minesweeper HSwMS Ulvön visiting Ystad 3 March 2025.

In December 2004, the Swedish Navy awarded Kockums a contract for the mid-life upgrade for five of the Landsort class (excluding HSwMS Landsort and HSwMS Arholma). The upgrade includes a new mine countermeasures (MCM) system, adaptations for international operations as well as a new air defence systems involving moving and modification of the Arte 726 from the Kaparen-class fast patrol boats. The first is expected to be completed in 2008. The upgraded vessels will be renamed as the Koster class, as the first vessel to be upgraded is HSwMS Koster (formerly the third ship in the Landsort class).

On 31 January 2005 a contract exceeding €30 million was awarded to Atlas Elektronik for the upgrade of these five vessels with the Atlas Integrated MCM Systems (IMCMS-S). The systems will be commissioned into operational service between 2008 and 2009. The system combines minehunting, minesweeping, mine disposal, surveillance and communication with other naval forces. It comprises an Atlas MCM Tactical Command and Control system, a broadband Atlas HMS-12M hull-mounted sonar and an Atlas mine identification and disposal system (MIDS) Seafox. The IMCMS-S onboard also fully integrates sensors and effectors like the self-propelled variable depth sonar, underwater positioning system, navigation radar and sensors, conventional MIDS systems, and air defence system.

The vessels are also upgraded to have Link 16 capability.

== See also ==
- List of mine warfare vessels of the Swedish Navy

Equivalent minehunters of the same era

- Lerici class
- Avenger class
- Sandown class
- Frankenthal class
- Alkmaar class
- Type 082
