= Standing NATO Mine Countermeasures Group 2 =

- Active: 1999–present
- Allegiance: (NATO) North Atlantic Treaty Organization

Commanders
- Current commander: Commodore Georgios Kypriotis, Hellenic Navy

Standing NATO Mine Countermeasures Group 2 (SNMCMG2) is a North Atlantic Treaty Organization (NATO) standing mine countermeasures Immediate Reaction Force. Its role is to provide NATO with an immediate operational response capability.

== History ==
From its activation on 27 May 1999, the unit was initially called Standing Mine Countermeasures Force (in the) Mediterranean (MCMFORMED).

MCMFORMED and her sister force Mine Counter Measures Force North Western Europe (MCMFORNORTH) were tasked in June 1999 to operate in the Adriatic Sea to clear ordnance jettisoned during Operation Allied Force. The combined force comprised 11 minehunters and minesweepers and a support ship. The operation, named Allied Harvest, began on 9 June 1999. Search activities began three days later and lasted 73 days. In total, 93 pieces of ordnance were located and cleared in the nine areas which encompassed 1,041 square nautical miles (3,570 km^{2}; 1,379 sq mi).

From 3 September 2001 it was known as the Mine Countermeasures Force South (MCMFORSOUTH) and from 1 January 2005 it became Standing NATO Mine Countermeasures Group 2.

== Current ships ==
In 2026, SNMCMG2 consisted of:

Ships in bold are currently part of the naval force

Year	Commander	Ship	Type	Part of task force	Flagship
2026	(Greece); Commodore; Georgios Kypriotis (2026 – ongoing)	(Greece) **HS Kountouriotis (F462)**	Elli-class frigate	Ongoing	Ongoing
2026	(Greece); Commodore; Georgios Kypriotis (2026 – ongoing)	(Italy) **ITS Chioggia (M5560)**	Gaeta-class minehunter	January – ongoing	—N/a
2026	(Greece); Commodore; Georgios Kypriotis (2026 – ongoing)	(Netherlands) **HNLMS Willemstad (M864)**	Alkmaar-class minehunter	May – Ongoing	—N/a
2026	(Greece); Commodore; Georgios Kypriotis (2026 – ongoing)	(Greece) HS Heracles (A472)	Atlas-class general support ship	January – 2026	8 January – 2026
2026	(Greece); Commodore; Georgios Kypriotis (2026 – ongoing)	(Turkey) TCG Anamur (M269)	Aydın-class minehunter	January – 2026	—N/a
2026	(Greece); Commodore; Georgios Kypriotis (2026 – ongoing)	(France) FS Capricorne (M653)	Éridan-class minehunter	March – 2026	—N/a
2026	(Greece); Commodore; Georgios Kypriotis (2026 – ongoing)	(Spain) SPS Tambre (M33)	Segura-class minehunter	March – 2026	—N/a

== See also ==
- Standing NATO Maritime Group 1
- Standing NATO Maritime Group 2
- Standing NATO Mine Countermeasures Group 1
