= USS Hawk (AM-133) =

Minesweeper of the United States Navy

History

United States
- Name: M/V Gale
- Owner: General Sea Foods Corp., Boston, Massachusetts
- Builder: Bethlehem Steel, Quincy, Massachusetts
- Launched: 1937
- Fate: Requisitioned by the US Navy, 1 January 1942

United States
- Name: USS Hawk
- Acquired: 1 January 1942
- Commissioned: 23 May 1942
- Decommissioned: 1 May 1944
- Stricken: 16 September 1944
- Notes: Sold 1944

General characteristics as Minesweeper
- Class & type: Hawk-class minesweeper
- Displacement: 530 long tons (540 t)
- Length: 147 ft (45 m)
- Beam: 26 ft (7.9 m)
- Draft: 13 ft (4.0 m)
- Propulsion: Cooper Bessemer diesel engine, one shaft, 650 shp (485 kW)
- Speed: 11.5 knots (13.2 mph; 21.3 km/h)
- Armament: • 2 × 6-pounder guns

USS Hawk (AM-133) was a Hawk-class minesweeper of the United States Navy during World War II.

Built in 1937 as the steel-hulled fishing trawler MV Gale by the Bethlehem Shipbuilding Co. of Quincy, Massachusetts, for the General Sea Foods Corp., Boston, Massachusetts.

She was acquired by the Navy on 1 January 1942. Conversion to a minesweeper began on 8 January 1942 at the Bethlehem Steel Co., East Boston, Massachusetts. Renamed Hawk on 21 January 1942, she completed conversion and was commissioned on 23 May 1942.

Hawk was assigned to the 1st Naval District and was based at the Boston Section Base. She performed general minesweeping duties near Boston, Massachusetts, and in mid-1943 was assigned to the Northern Ship Lane Patrol.

Hawk was decommissioned on 1 May 1944, struck from the Navy Register on 16 September 1944 and sold. Her fate is unknown.
