= Bedok-class mine countermeasures vessel =

Singaporean navy vessel

Bedok-class
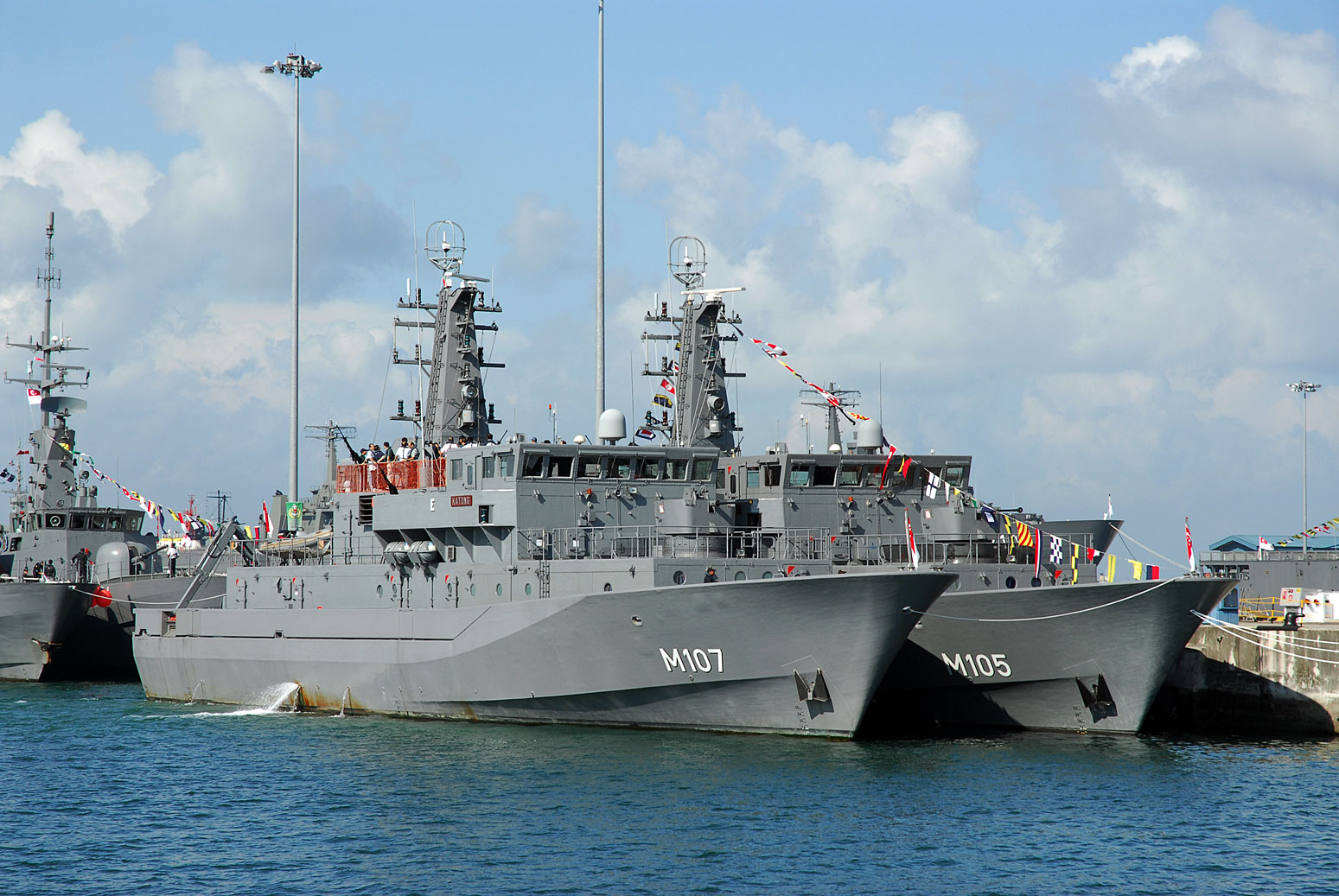
- Bedok-class MCMVs berthed at Changi Naval Base during the Navy Open House 2007

Class overview
- Name: Bedok
- Builders: Kockums, ST Engineering (Marine)
- Operators: Republic of Singapore Navy
- Completed: 4
- Active: 4

General characteristics
- Type: Mine countermeasures vessel
- Displacement: Standard: 360 t (350 long tons; 400 short tons); Full load: 380 t (370 long tons; 420 short tons)
- Length: 47.5 m (155 ft 10 in)
- Beam: 9.6 m (31 ft 6 in)
- Draught: 2.3 m (7 ft 7 in)
- Installed power: 4 × Saab-Scania DSI 14 diesel engines, each producing 1,440 bhp (1,070 kW)
- Propulsion: 2 × Voith Schneider Propellers; Total output: 5,760 bhp (4,300 kW)
- Speed: 15 kn (28 km/h; 17 mph)
- Range: 2,000 nmi (3,700 km; 2,300 mi) at 12 kn (22 km/h; 14 mph)
- Complement: 33 (5 officers and 28 men)
- Sensors & processing systems: Navigation radar: Norcontrol DB2000 (I band); Sonar: Thales Underwater Systems TSM-2022 MkIII hull-mounted mine hunting sonar; DAPS: SIREHNA DAPS (Dynamic Auto-pilot Positioning System); Thales Underwater Systems towed synthetic aperture sonar
- Armament: Main gun: 1 × Bofors 40 mm gun (before 2009 refit); 1 × 25mm M242 Bushmaster Mk 38 Mod 2 with stabilised Typhoon weapon sighting system (after 2009 refit); Machine guns: 4 × STK 50MG 12.7 mm (0.50 in) HMG; Mine disposal: ECA K-STER expendable mine disposal system

The Bedok class are mine countermeasures vessels of the Republic of Singapore Navy (RSN). They play an important role in the maritime security of Singapore, ensuring that the Singapore Strait and the sea lanes surrounding Singapore remain mine-free and open to international shipping. It is estimated that closure of Singapore's ports would result in direct trade losses amounting to more than US$1.2 billion daily, posing a serious threat to Singapore's economy. The four ships form the Sixth Flotilla of the RSN.

== Planning and acquisition ==
The RSN first acquired mine countermeasures capabilities in 1975, when the United States Navy's USS Whippoorwill and USS Thrasher were re-activated by the RSN's engineers and technicians in California. These Bluebird-class minesweepers were commissioned as RSS Jupiter and RSS Mercury respectively. RSS Jupiter was scrapped on 15 August 1986 and RSS Mercury was decommissioned on 31 March 1993. The need for modern minehunting vessels saw Singapore entering into an agreement with Sweden in 1991 to purchase four Landsort-class mine countermeasures vessels.

Bedok-class ships
Name	Pennant number	Launched	Launched by	Commissioned
RSS Bedok	M105	24 June 1993	Mrs Yeo Ning Hong	7 October 1995
RSS Kallang	M106	29 January 1994	Mrs Lee Boon Yang	7 October 1995
RSS Katong	M107	8 April 1994	Mrs Lim Siong Guan	7 October 1995
RSS Punggol	M108	16 July 1994	Mrs Ng Jui Ping	7 October 1995

The ships were named after coastal areas in Singapore, and were selected from a name-the-ship contest held in 1993.

== Design and construction ==
=== Platform ===
The ship's design incorporates a number of features important for mine countermeasures – low acoustic and magnetic signatures, as well as shock resistance to underwater explosions.

The Bedok class is made of glass-reinforced plastic, designed by the Swedish Navy and Kockums (then known as Karlskronavarvet). Its low magnetic and acoustic signatures reduces the possibility of setting off mines. It is highly durable, fire- and shock-resistant, easy to repair and is maintained only by painting. The ship's bridge, major combat equipment and engines are also shock-mounted to cushion against underwater explosions.

Each Bedok-class MCMV is powered by two independent vertical Voith Schneider Propellers, designed specifically to ensure excellent manoeuvrability and low noise signature.

The first ship, RSS Bedok, was built by Kockums in Sweden based on the Landsort-class design. The hulls of the remaining three ships were prefabricated in Sweden and transferred to Singapore for final assembly by Singapore Technologies (ST) Marine.

=== Mine countermeasures ===
Each ship operates the ECA K-STER expendable mine disposal system from France, for the identification and destruction of mines. The MCMVs also work closely with the explosive ordnance disposal divers from the Naval Diving Unit for mine disposal.

The Bedok class is equipped to operate the Kockums remote-controlled catamaran minesweepers, and are also capable of laying a defensive minefield.

It has also been reported that the Bedok class operate two REMUS unmanned underwater vehicles as part of their mine countermeasures suite.

=== Sensors ===
The Bedok class is equipped with a Thales Underwater Systems TSM 2022 MkIII hull-mounted minehunting sonar. The sonar has a detection range of 2 km (6,600 ft) for submarines and 500 m (1,600 ft) for mines. The classification range for a mine is typically 200 to 300 m (660 to 980 ft).

The ships are also equipped with a Thales Underwater Systems towed synthetic aperture sonar.

The ship's navigation radar is the Norcontrol DB2000 operating at I band.

=== Upgrade ===
In November 2007, it was reported that three companies were shortlisted to compete for the supply of a new one-shot mine disposal system to equip the Bedok class. Atlas Elektronik, ECA and Gaymarine were selected for detailed technical and commercial evaluation following an initial assessment of five candidate systems. Kongsberg Defence & Aerospace and L-3 Ocean Systems, offering their Minesniper system and Mk 8x Expendable Mine Destructor respectively, were eliminated from consideration. BAE Systems was unable to provide its Archerfish system for evaluation within the required timescale.

In November 2008, the Bedok-class upgrade programme was revealed. Of the four vessels, two are planned to be fully refitted with modifications to the hulls and mine-hunting systems, while the other two will receive partial refits. A decision between two competing European bids was expected to be made by April 2009, with completion of the first platform expected 18 months later.

On 12 May 2009, Thales announced that the Defence Science and Technology Agency of Singapore awarded it as the prime contractor for the Bedok-class Life Extension Programme. Thales will provide an integrated mine countermeasure combat system, including the mine information system, a hull-mounted sonar, a towed synthetic aperture sonar and expendable mine disposal systems. The towed synthetic sonar array is the DUBM 44, an unmanned underwater vehicle that uses onboard processing of digital signals to provide high-resolution imagery. The DUBM 44 is not autonomous and is connected by cable to the surface ship. Thales will also be in charge of making any structural alterations to the vessels in relation to the integration of new systems and equipment.

== Operational history ==
After the crash of SilkAir Flight 185 on 19 December 1997 in the Musi River near Palembang, RSS Bedok, RSS Kallang and RSS Punggol were deployed as part of a Singapore Armed Forces contingent to assist Indonesian authorities in their search and recovery operations near the crash site.

The RSN was the first navy invited by the Indonesian Navy to conduct mine countermeasure operations to clear World War II mines off Tanjung Awar Awar, 70 km (38 nmi) north-east of Surabaya in February 1997. RSS Bedok and RSS Kallang, together with two Indonesian Navy vessels, successfully neutralised eight buried mines.

The ships were also involved in search and rescue operations after a Royal Navy Westland Lynx helicopter crashed into the South China Sea together with its two personnel on board during a training exercise on 23 September 1998.

The RSN was the first navy in the world to fire a deployed expendable mine disposal vehicle, during a live firing on 23 April 2012.

In December 2014, RSS Kallang was deployed in the search for Airasia Flight QZ8501 after it crashed into the Java Sea on 28 December 2014; along with RSS Supreme, RSS Valour, RSS Persistence, MV Swift Rescue, and two Lockheed C-130H Hercules.

=== Major exercises ===
The ships frequently participate in military exercises with various countries. These include:

- Western Pacific Naval Symposium MCMEX/DIVEX, a multinational exercise involving 21 countries
- International Mine Countermeasure Exercise (IMCMEX), a multilateral defence exercise hosted by United States Naval Forces Central Command
- Exercise Bersama Padu, a Five Power Defence Arrangements exercise
- Exercise Mercury, an annual exercise with the United States Navy
- Exercise Lejon Singa, an annual exercise with the Swedish Navy
- Joint MINEX, an annual exercise with the Indonesian Navy
- Exercise Milan, a multilateral exercise hosted by the Indian Navy

== See also ==
- Koster-class mine countermeasures vessel
- Landsort-class mine countermeasures vessel
