= USS Merganser (AM-135) =

Minesweeper of the United States Navy

History

United States
- Name: Annapolis
- Owner: General Sea Foods Corp., Boston, Massachusetts
- Builder: Bethlehem Steel, Quincy, Massachusetts
- Launched: 1937
- Fate: Requisitioned by the US Navy, 3 January 1942

United States
- Name: USS Ocean
- Acquired: 3 January 1942
- Commissioned: 23 May 1942
- Decommissioned: 1 May 1944
- Renamed: Merganser, 18 January 1942
- Stricken: 16 September 1944
- Fate: Sold to former owner, renamed Ocean

General characteristics as Minesweeper
- Class & type: Hawk-class minesweeper
- Displacement: 500 long tons (510 t)
- Length: 133 ft 7 in (40.72 m)
- Beam: 26 ft 1 in (7.95 m)
- Draft: 12 ft 8 in (3.86 m)
- Speed: 10 knots (12 mph; 19 km/h)
- Armament: 2 × 6-pounder guns; 2 × .50 cal (12.7 mm) machine guns; 2 × depth charge projectors

The first USS Merganser (AM-135) was a minesweeper in the United States Navy during World War II. She was named for the duck, merganser.

Originally the commercial trawler Annapolis, Merganser was built in 1937 by the Bethlehem Steel Corp., Quincy, Massachusetts; acquired by the U.S. Navy as Ocean through Maritime Commission requisition purchase from the General Sea Foods Corp., Boston, Massachusetts, 3 January 1942; renamed Merganser 18 January 1942; converted by Bethlehem Steel Atlantic Works, East Boston, Massachusetts; and commissioned 23 May 1942.

== World War II East Coast Assignment ==
Assigned to the 1st Naval District, Merganser operated from the Woods Hole Section Base, patrolling the waters off New England, until February 1944.

== Deactivation ==
She then proceeded to Boston, Massachusetts, for inactivation, decommissioning there 1 May. She was struck from the Naval Register 16 September, and on the 29th transferred to the Maritime Commission. She was subsequently sold to her former owner and renamed Ocean.
