= Hawk-class minesweeper =

World War II minesweeper

Class overview
- Operators: United States Navy
- Preceded by: USS Eagle (AM-132)
- Succeeded by: Admirable class
- Built: 1937
- In commission: 1942–1944
- Completed: 3

General characteristics
- Type: Minesweeper
- Displacement: 500–590 long tons (508–599 t)
- Length: 147 ft (45 m) (Hawk & Ibis); 133 ft (41 m) (Merganser)
- Beam: 26 ft (7.9 m)
- Draft: 13 ft (4.0 m)
- Propulsion: Cooper Bessemer diesel engine, one shaft, 650 shp (485 kW)
- Speed: 10–12 knots (19–22 km/h; 12–14 mph)
- Armament: 2 × 6-pounder guns; 2 × .50 cal (12.7 mm) machine guns; 2 × depth charge projectors

The Hawk class were a minesweeper class of the United States Navy during World War II.

All three vessels were originally fishing trawlers acquired by requisition purchase from the General Sea Foods Corp. of Boston. They patrolled off the New England coast from 1942, until they were decommissioned in 1944.

== Ships ==
- USS Hawk (AM-133)
- USS Ibis (AM-134)
- USS Merganser (AM-135)
