= Annapolis, Ohio =

Unincorporated community in Ohio, U.S.

Coordinates: 40°24′40″N 80°51′47″W

Annapolis is an unincorporated community in Salem Township, Jefferson County, in the U.S. state of Ohio.

== History ==
Annapolis was originally called New Salem, and under the latter name was platted in 1802. A post office called New Salem was established in 1815, the name was changed to Annapolis in 1823, and the post office closed in 1914. Besides the post office, Annapolis had a country store.
