= USS Annapolis =

USS Annapolis may refer to:

- USS Annapolis (PG-10), a gunboat commissioned in 1897 and in periodic service until 1919, then used as a training ship until 1940
- USS Annapolis (PF-15), a Tacoma-class frigate in service from 1944 to 1946, and sold to Mexico in 1947
- USS Annapolis (AGMR-1), ex-USS Gilbert Islands (CVE-107) escort carrier renamed Annapolis (AGMR-1) in 1963
- USS Annapolis (SSN-760), a Los Angeles-class submarine commissioned in 1992
