= Standing NATO Mine Countermeasures Group 1 =

- Active: 1973–present
- Allegiance: (NATO) North Atlantic Treaty Organization

Commanders
- Current commander: Commander Kacper Sterne, Polish Navy

Standing NATO Mine Countermeasures Group 1 (SNMCMG1) is a North Atlantic Treaty Organisation (NATO) standing mine countermeasures immediate reaction force. Its role is to provide NATO with an immediate operational response capability.

== History ==
From its activation at Ostend on 11 May 1973, the unit was initially called Standing Naval Force Channel (STANAVFORCHAN).

STANAVFORCHAN and her sister force Mine Counter Measures Force Mediterranean (MCMFORMED) were tasked in June 1999 to operate in the Adriatic Sea to clear ordnance jettisoned during Operation Allied Force. The combined force comprised 11 minehunters and minesweepers and a support ship. The operation, named Allied Harvest, began on 9 June 1999. Search activities began three days later and lasted 73 days. In total, 93 pieces of ordnance were located and cleared in the nine areas which encompassed 1,041 square nautical miles (3,570 km^{2}; 1,379 sq mi).

From 3 September 2001 it was known as the Mine Countermeasures Force North Western Europe (MCMFORNORTH) and from 1 January 2005 it became Standing NATO Mine Countermeasures Group 1.

== Current ships ==
In 2026, SNMCMG1 consisted of:

Previous flagship
Current flagship

Ships in bold are currently part of the naval force

Year	Commander	Ship	Type	Part of task force	Flagship
2026	(Poland); Commander; Kacper Sterne (January – June) (Lithuania); Commander; Donatas Gečas (June – ongoing)	(Poland) ORP Kontradmiral Xawery Czernicki	Kontradmiral Xawery Czernicki-class logistical support vessel	January – June	January – June
2026	(Poland); Commander; Kacper Sterne (January – June) (Lithuania); Commander; Donatas Gečas (June – ongoing)	(Germany) FGS Fulda	Frankenthal-class minehunter	January – June	n/a
2026	(Poland); Commander; Kacper Sterne (January – June) (Lithuania); Commander; Donatas Gečas (June – ongoing)	(Netherlands) HNLMS Schiedam	Alkmaar-class minehunter	January – June	n/a
2026	(Poland); Commander; Kacper Sterne (January – June) (Lithuania); Commander; Donatas Gečas (June – ongoing)	(Lithuania) **LNS Jotvingis**	Jotvingis-class minelayer	June – ongoing	June – ongoing
2026	(Poland); Commander; Kacper Sterne (January – June) (Lithuania); Commander; Donatas Gečas (June – ongoing)	(Poland) **ORP Mewa**	Kormoran 2-class minehunter	June – ongoing	n/a

== See also ==
- Standing NATO Mine Countermeasures Group 2
- Standing NATO Maritime Group 1
- Standing NATO Maritime Group 2
