= Type 057K minesweeper =

Type 057K minesweeper with NATO reporting name Lianyun (连云) class is a type of minesweeper of the People's Liberation Army Navy (PLAN) that is no longer in service after its retirement.

Type 057K program begun in 1956 when PLAN first issued a requirement of gulf minesweeper. The 1st Ship Product Design Directorate of the Shipbuilding Industry Management Bureau of the 1st Machinery Ministry (一机部船舶工业管理局第一船舶产品设计室) was assigned the designer, and completed the design work in two years. However, due to political turmoil in China, namely, the Great Leap Forward, construction was delayed and it was not until December 12, 1962 when the first boat was finally completed by Qiuxin (求新) Shipyard, a division of Jiangnan Shipyard. Type 057K is a steel-hulled design based on fishing trawler and it became most numerous minesweepers in PLAN service. In 1972, Chinese premier Zhou Enlai personally authorized deployment of Type 057K to North Vietnam to sweep the mines laid by US, and successfully cleared five Mk 52 mines. Type 057K is designed to operate in the gulfs and rivers where larger sea-going minesweepers cannot operate effectively but despite large numbers built, all of them have been retired by the early 2010s after half a century of service. Specification:

- Length (m): 40
- Beam (m): 8
- Draft (m): 3.5
- Displacement (t): < 200
- Speed (kn): 18
- Propulsion: 1 diesel engine @ 400 hp
- Armament: 1 twin 37 mm, 1 twin 14.5 mm machine gun

Type	Class	Builder	Commissioned	Status	Fleet
057K	Lianyun	Jiangnan Shipyard	Dec 12, 1962	Retired	PLAN
