= Annapolis mossi =

Scientific classification
- Kingdom: Animalia
- Phylum: Arthropoda
- Subphylum: Chelicerata
- Class: Arachnida
- Order: Araneae
- Infraorder: Araneomorphae
- Family: Linyphiidae
- Genus: Annapolis; Millidge, 1984
- Species: A. mossi

Binomial name
- Annapolis mossi (Muma, 1945)

Genus of spiders

Annapolis is a monotypic genus of North American dwarf spiders containing the single species, Annapolis mossi. It was first described by Alfred Frank Millidge in 1984, and has only been found in United States.
