= Indian locomotive class WDS-8 =

Type and origin
- Power type: Diesel
- Builder: CLW
- Build date: 1979–1982
- Total produced: 5
Specifications
- Configuration
  - UIC: Bo′Bo′
  - Commonwealth: Bo-Bo
- Gauge: 1,676 mm (5 ft 6 in)
- Wheel diameter: 1,092 mm (3 ft 7 in)
- Wheelbase: 10.834 m (35 ft 6 1/2 in)
- Width: 2.764 m (9 ft 7/8 in)
- Height: 4.195 m (13 ft 9 1/8 in)
- Loco weight: 73,000 kg (161,000 lb)
- Fuel type: Diesel
- Fuel capacity: 1,000 L (220 imp gal; 260 US gal)
- Lubricant cap.: 530 L (120 imp gal; 140 US gal), 630 L (140 imp gal; 170 US gal) DLW
- Water cap.: 20 L (4.4 imp gal; 5.3 US gal), 28 L (6.2 imp gal; 7.4 US gal) DLW
- Prime mover: MAK 800hp diesel engine
- Engine type: Inline-6 diesel
- Aspiration: Turbo-supercharged
- Generator: DC
- Traction motors: 6 DC
- Cylinders: 6
- Transmission: Diesel–electric transmission
- MU working: 2
- Loco brake: Air, Vacuum
- Train brakes: Vacuum, Air
Performance figures
- Maximum speed: 35 km/h (22 mph)
- Power output: Max: 800 hp (600 kW); Site rated: 700 hp (520 kW)
- Tractive effort: 22.000 t (22 long tons; 24 short tons) maximum, 16.050 t (16 long tons; 18 short tons) continuous
Career
- Operators: Steel Authority of India
- Locale: Leased and sold to some industrial concerns
- First run: 1972
- Current owner: Steel Authority of India
- Disposition: Withdrawn from service, scrapped

The Indian locomotive class WDS-8 was a class of diesel–electric locomotive that was developed in 1979 by the Chittaranjan Locomotive Works for Indian Railways, but ended up being delivered exclusively to the private sector. The model name stood for broad gauge (W), Diesel (D), Shunter (S) engine, 8th generation (8). They entered service in 1979. A total of five WDS-8 locomotives was built at Chittaranjan Locomotive Works (CLW), Chittaranjan between 1979 and 1982.

All WDS-8 units were sold to the Steel Authority of India. As of November 2020, these locomotives have been withdrawn from service.

== History ==
The history of the WDS-8 class began in the early 1970s with the Railway Board's dual aims of addressing the shortcomings of the preceding WDS-4, and to remove all of Indian Railways' steam locomotives from operational service by a target date of 1990. The WDS-8 was a competing bid from CLW to the Banaras Locomotive Works's WDS-6 class, intended for industrial concerns in the private sector as well as for the Railways itself. The WDS-8 had a MAK diesel engine with a maximum output of 800 hp, which was similar to the engine used in the newly upgraded YDM-1 class. They possessed short cabs modeled on those of CLW's electric locomotives with a single long, narrow hood. The WDS-8 was severely underpowered compared to the WDS-6 class.

As a result of these shortcomings, CLW decided not to produce any more WDS-8 locomotives after five units, which were then transferred to the plants of the Steel Authority of India (SAIL).

As of November 2020, no locomotives of this class are in service.

== See also ==
- Rail transport in India#History
- Locomotives of India
- Rail transport in India
