= HAZMAT Class 8 Corrosive substances =

Critera and Storage for corrosive substances

A corrosive material is a liquid or solid that causes full thickness destruction of human skin at the site of contact within a specified period of time. A liquid that has a severe corrosion rate on steel or aluminum based on the criteria in 49CFR 173.137(c)(2) is also a corrosive material.

== Divisions ==
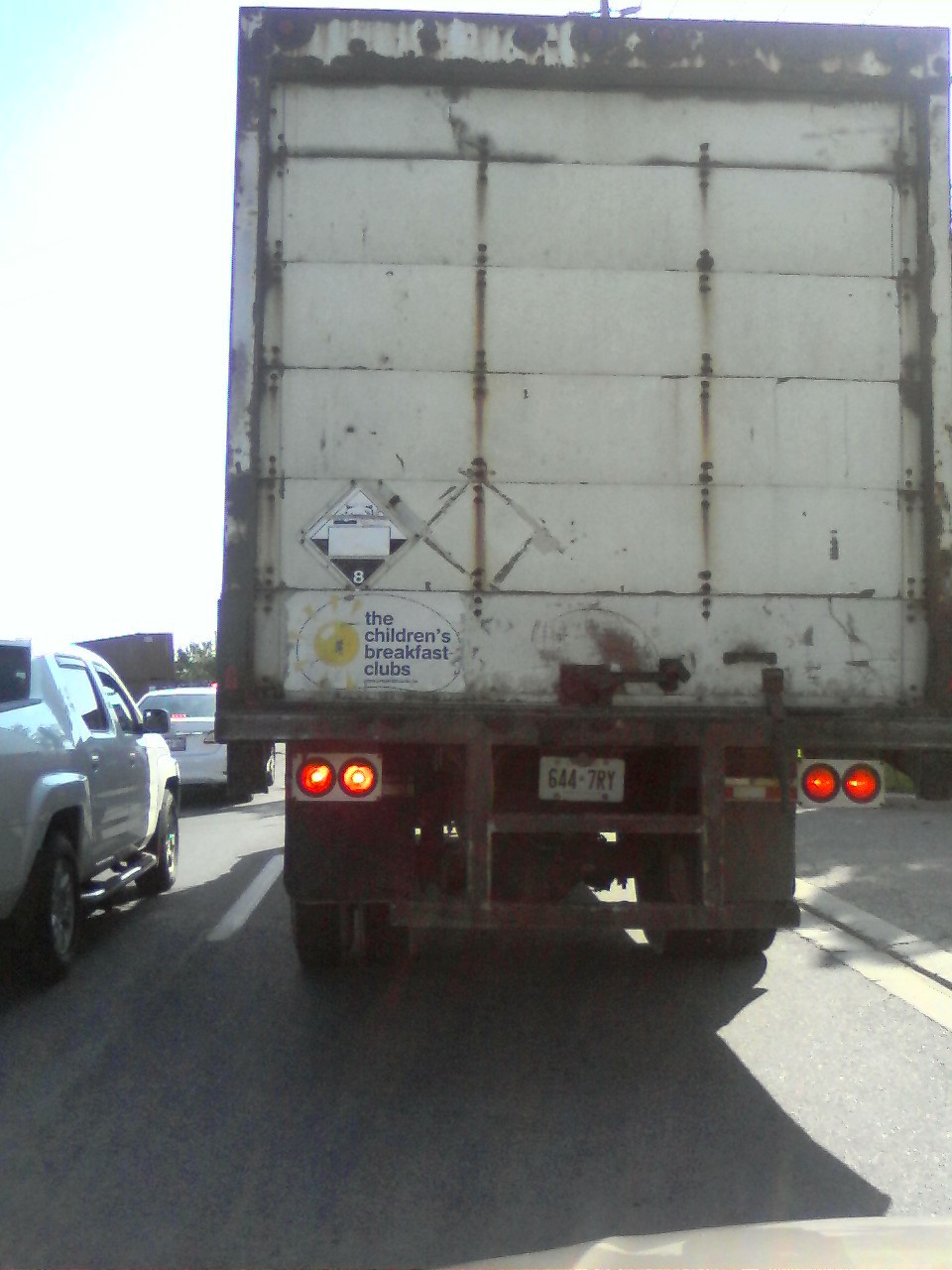
HAZMAT Class 8 placard on a truck in Canada.

454 kg (1001 lbs) or more gross weight of a corrosive material. Although the corrosive class includes both acids and bases, the hazardous materials load and segregation chart does not make any reference to the separation of various incompatible corrosive materials from each other. In spite of this, however, when shipping corrosives, care should be taken to ensure that incompatible corrosive materials can not become mixed, as many corrosives react very violently if mixed. If responding to a transportation incident involving corrosive materials (especially a mixture of corrosives), caution should be exercised.

== Placards ==
Hazardous Materials
Class 8: Corrosive

== Compatibility Table ==
Load and Segregation Chart
	Weight	1.1	1.2	1.3	1.4	1.5	1.6	2.1	2.2	2.2	2.3		3	4.1	4.2	4.3	5.1	5.2	6.1	7	8
	Weight	1.1	1.2	1.3	1.4	1.5	1.6	2.1	2.2	2.2	A	B	3	4.1	4.2	4.3	5.1	5.2	A	7	8
8	1,001 lb (454 kg)	No	No	No	O	No					No	O		O	No	O	O	O	No		
Key
The absence of any hazard class or division or a blank space in the table indicates that no restrictions apply.: X: These materials may not be loaded, transported, or stored together in the same transport vehicle or storage facility during the course of transportation.; O: Indicates that these materials may not be loaded, transported or stored together in the same transport vehicle or storage facility during the course of transportation, unless separated in a manner that, in the event of leakage from packages under conditions normally incident to transportation, commingling of hazardous materials would not occur.; Source: United States Code of Federal Regulations, Title 49 CFR §177.848 - Segregation of hazardous materials.

== Packing Groups ==
Class 8 Packing Groups
The packing group of Class 8 material is indicated in Column 5 of the 49CFR 172.101 Table. When the 49CFR 172.101 Table provides more than one packing group for a Class 8 material, the packing group must be determined using data obtained from tests conducted in accordance with the 1992 OECD Guideline for Testing of Chemicals, Number 404 "Acute Dermal Irritation/Corrosion" as follows:
Group	Explanation
I	Materials that cause full thickness destruction of intact skin tissue within an observation period of up to 60 minutes starting after the exposure time of three minutes or less.
II	Materials other than those meeting Packing Group I criteria that cause full thickness destruction of intact skin tissue within an observation period of up to 14 days starting after the exposure time of more than three minutes but not more than 60 minutes.
III	Materials, other than those meeting Packing Group I or II criteria: 1. That cause full thickness destruction of intact skin tissue within an observation period of up to 14 days starting after the exposure time of more than 60 minutes but not more than 4 hours; or 2. That do not cause full thickness destruction of intact skin tissue but exhibit a corrosion rate on steel or aluminum surfaces exceeding 6.25 mm (0.25 inch) a year at a test temperature of 55 °C (130 °F). For the purpose of testing steel P3 (ISO 9328-1) or a similar type, and for testing aluminum, non-clad types 7075-T6 or AZ5GU-T6 should be used. An acceptable test is described in ASTM G 31–72.
