= Type 058 minesweeper =

Chinese riverine minesweeper

Class overview
- Operators: People's Liberation Army Navy

General characteristics
- Type: Minesweeper
- Displacement: 400 tonnes (390 long tons; 440 short tons)
- Length: 40 m (131 ft 3 in)
- Beam: 8 m (26 ft 3 in)
- Draft: 3.5 m (11 ft 6 in)
- Installed power: Internal combustion engine
- Propulsion: 1 × Diesel engine, 400 hp (298 kW)
- Speed: 8 knots (15 km/h; 9.2 mph)
- Sensors & processing systems: 1 × navigational radar
- Armament: 2 x 14.5 mm (0.57 in) guns

The Type 058 minesweeper is a Chinese riverine minesweeper developed for the People's Liberation Army Navy (PLAN), and by the early 2010s, it has already been retired from active service from PLAN.

In 1967, PLAN begun development of a class of riverine minesweeper to counter magnetic mines, and it was decided to adopt a low-magnetic hull for the minesweeper, utilizing the manganese-aluminum based low magnetic steel. The first unit was completed by Jiangnan Shipyard in 1971, and subsequently, three more were completed. However, due to the Chinese industrial and technical capability at the time, processing the manganese-aluminum based low magnetic steel to the requirement was extremely difficult and costly, and after completing four minesweepers, no more units were ordered despite the relatively successful service in PLAN. It was decided to develop a fiberglass-hulled minesweeper, Type 7102 minesweeper as a successor of Type 058.
