= Type 7102 minesweeper =

Class overview
- Operators: People's Liberation Army Navy

General characteristics
- Type: minesweeper
- Displacement: 142 tonnes (140 long tons; 157 short tons)
- Length: 38.9 m (127 ft 7 in)
- Beam: 5.4 m (17 ft 9 in)
- Draft: 1.62 m (5 ft 4 in)
- Installed power: Internal combustion engine
- Propulsion: 2 × 12V180 Diesel engine
- Speed: 19 knots (35 km/h; 22 mph)
- Range: 500 mi (800 km)
- Sensors & processing systems: 1 × navigational radar
- Armament: 2 x 25.4 mm (1.00 in) guns

Type 7102 is a Chinese minesweeper developed for the People's Liberation Army Navy (PLAN), and by the early 2010s, it has already been retired from active service from PLAN.

Type 7102 is designed to supplement or replace earlier Type 058, which despite its successful development, failed to enter service in large numbers. The reason Type 058 did not enter large production is due to its construction material, which was the manganese-aluminium based low-magnetic steel, was extremely difficult to process because the limitation of Chinese industrial and technical capability at the time. As a result, an alternative was sought and it was decided to develop a fiberglass-hulled minesweeper, which was designated as Type 7102.

Construction begun in May 1972 at Wuhu Shipyard (芜湖造船厂), the predecessor of the Wuhu Xinlian Shipbuilding Co., Ltd. (芜湖新联造船有限公司), and after two and half a year, the boat was launched in December 1974. From April through September 1975, both riverine and sea trials were completed at the Yangtze River. The minesweeper was formally handed over to PLAN in November 1975, but only a single unit was built, and has since retired from active service in the Chinese navy.
