= Wolei-class minelayer =

Sole minelayer in People's Liberation Army Navy

Class overview
- Name: Wolei class
- Builders: Dalian Shipbuilding Industry Company
- Operators: People's Liberation Army Navy
- Built: 1984–1988
- In commission: 1988–present
- Completed: 1

General characteristics
- Type: Minelayer
- Displacement: 2,300 t (2,264 long tons; 2,535 short tons) standard; 2,418 t (2,380 long tons; 2,665 short tons) full
- Length: 94.88 m (311 ft 3 in)
- Beam: 14 m (45 ft 11 in)
- Draught: 3.88 m (12 ft 9 in)
- Propulsion: 2 × 12PA6V-280 diesel engines; 4,320 hp (3,221 kW); 2 shafts
- Speed: 18.5 knots (34.3 km/h; 21.3 mph)
- Range: 3,000 nmi (5,600 km; 3,500 mi) at 16 kn (30 km/h; 18 mph)
- Armament: 2 × twin Type 61 37 mm (1.5 in) guns; up to 200 mines

The Type 918 Wolei-class minelayer is the sole minelayer in the People's Liberation Army Navy, numbered 814.

The ship was designed by the 708 Institute in 1981, with Mr. Ma Jinghua (馬錦華) as the general designer. All of the onboard subsystems were completed in 1984. Dalian Shipyard begin construction of the ship in 1984 and completed it in 1988. Although successful, no more minelayers of this type were ordered because most other naval vessels in the PLAN inventory were also capable of laying mines. This class, however, does have advantage over other platforms in that it can lay conformal mines, i.e. mines with irregular shapes instead of the ordinary cylindrical and spherical shapes, and conformal mines are much harder to detect and identify. The mine laying process is fully computerized and both the hardware and software have been upgraded to accommodate new weapons and tactics. In addition to laying mines, the ship is also extensively equipped for use as a supply ship, and has been deployed in supply missions much more frequently than as a minelayer.
