= Type 312 minesweeper =

Chinese minesweeping drone

Class overview
- Name: Type 312 class minesweeper
- Builders: Hudong-Zhonghua Shipyard
- Operators: People's Liberation Army Navy

General characteristics
- Type: Drone minesweeper
- Displacement: 47 t (46 long tons; 52 short tons)
- Length: 20.9 m (68 ft 7 in)
- Beam: 3.9 m (12 ft 10 in)
- Draught: 2.1 m (6 ft 11 in)
- Propulsion: 1 × Type 12V150C diesel engine; 300 hp (224 kW); 1 shafts
- Speed: 25 knots (46 km/h; 29 mph)
- Range: 144 nmi (267 km; 166 mi) at 12 kn (22 km/h; 14 mph)
- Complement: 3 (when crewed)
- Armament: Machine gun mount available for operation

The Chinese Type 312 class minesweeper was also known as Futi class. It was the first remote minesweeping drone, and was successfully used in the Vietnam War.

Although originally designed as a minesweeping drone, the Type 312 can also be crewed by a 3-member complement as a regular minesweeper. The chief designer was Mr. Diao Haiguang (刁海光) of the 710th Institute, and from the start of the project to the completion of the first two units (two units are being built simultaneously), it only took less than two years when the first two units entered the service for the People's Liberation Army Navy. Due to its small size, this class is maintained on land and thus is in better conditions than most of other larger boats and ships in the reserve fleet. The drone can be remotely operated from more than 5 km (3.1 mi) away.
