= K-8-class minesweeper =

Soviet Minesweeper Class

Class overview
- Name: K-8 class minesweeping boat
- Operators: Cuban Revolutionary Navy; Russian Navy; Vietnam People's Navy; Polish Navy; Nicaraguan Navy
- In service: 1954-present
- Completed: 40

General characteristics
- Type: Coastal Minesweeping Boat
- Tonnage: 26 tons
- Length: 16.9 m (55 ft)
- Beam: 1.2 m (4 ft)
- Height: 3.2 m (10 ft)
- Installed power: 3x diesel engines delivering 700 horsepower
- Speed: 18 knots (33 km/h)
- Complement: 6
- Armament: 2x M38 DShK 12.7mm Machine Guns on Bow

The K-8 class was a minesweeper first manufactured by Poland for the Soviet Navy in 1954.

== Operational history ==
Those minesweepers replaced a variety of minesweepers that had been used during World War II. This gave the navy an inexpensive ship to clear mines from its harbors in case of a war with NATO and the West. A wooden hull negated the effects of magnetic mines, and the vessels towed minesweeping gear behind them. However, vessels had no equipment for actually handling mines aboard ship.

A total of forty vessels were completed. The TR-40 minesweeper slowly replaced the K-8s in Soviet service, but the vessels were transferred to foreign navies such as Poland, Cuba and Vietnam. Designated Project 361T, a handful of K-8 boats were converted to mine warfare drones but saw limited service. The survivors were put into reserve until being struck from the record in the early 1980s.

== Bibliography ==
- Gardiner, Robert; Chumbley, Stephen (1995). Conway's All The World's Fighting Ships 1947–1995. Annapolis, Maryland, USA: Naval Institute Press. ISBN 1-55750-132-7.
- "STMMain". russianwarrior.com.
- "World Navies Today: Russian Littoral Warfare Ships". Archived from the original on 2000-08-15.
