= A-class minehunter =

Turkish class of minehunter vessels

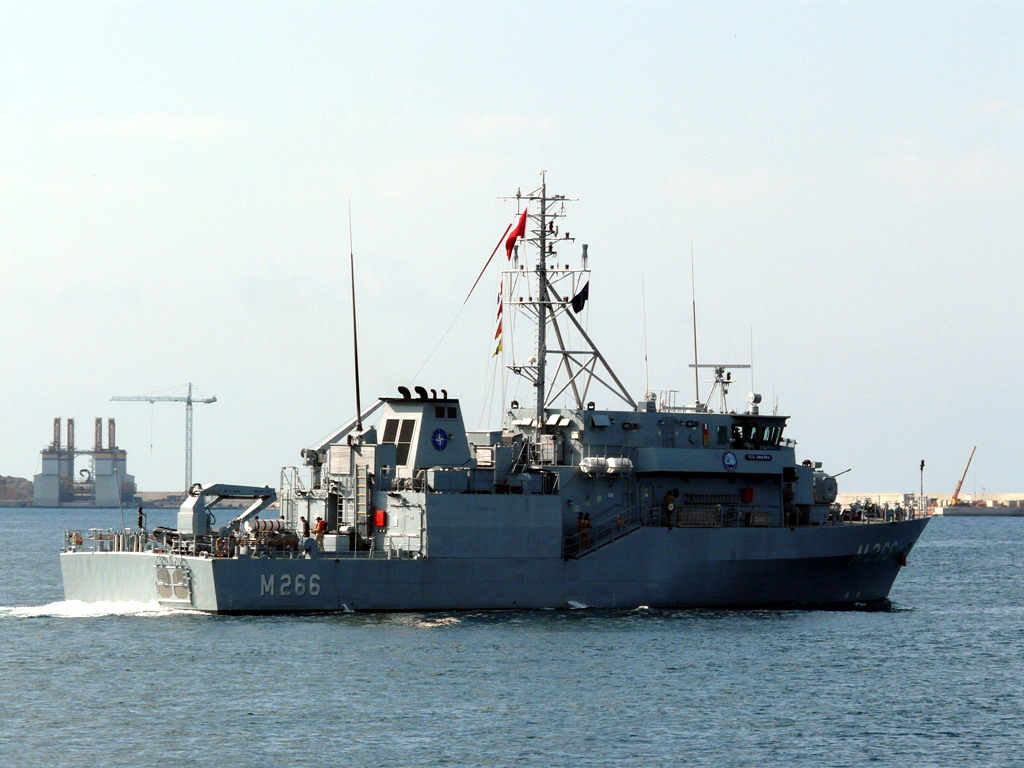
- Amasra (M266)

Class overview
- Builders: Lürssen; Abeking & Rasmussen; Istanbul Naval Yard
- Operators: Turkish Naval Forces
- In commission: 2005–present
- Planned: 6
- Completed: 6
- Active: 6

General characteristics
- Type: Minehunter
- Displacement: 650 t
- Length: 54.4 m (178 ft)
- Beam: 9.2 m (30 ft)
- Draft: 2.6 m (8 ft 6 in)
- Propulsion: 2 × MTU 16V 538 TB91 diesel engines, 2040 kW each; 2 × electric motors for slow and silent maneuvering; 2 × Renk PLS 25 E gearboxes; 2 × controllable pitch propellers
- Speed: 18 kn (33 km/h)
- Complement: 41
- Sensors & processing systems: 1 × Marconi 2093 VDS mine hunting sonar; DRBN 32 navigation radar
- Electronic warfare & decoys: 2 × Barricade chaff and flare launcher
- Armament: 1 × 30 mm gun; 2 × 12.7 mm machine gun; 2 × PAP-105 Mk5 mine hunting system; Mine laying capabilities
- Notes: mine diver equipment, decompression chamber; crane

The A class is a class of minehunter vessels in the Turkish Navy. In 1999, the German shipyards Lürssen and Abeking & Rasmussen were contracted to build six Frankenthal-class ships for the Turkish Navy, a purchase worth US$630 million. While the first vessel was built in Germany, later ships were constructed by the Istanbul Naval Shipyard.

The Turkish Navy has become the second naval force in the world, after the German Navy, to use a non-magnetic steel hull in its minehunter vessels.

Pennant Number	Name	shipyard	commissioned
M265	Alanya	Abeking & Rasmussen, Lürssen	26 July 2005
M266	Amasra	Istanbul Naval Shipyard	26 July 2005
M267	Ayvalık	Istanbul Naval Shipyard	22 June 2007
M268	Akçakoca	Istanbul Naval Shipyard	17 September 2007
M269	Anamur	Istanbul Naval Shipyard	
M270	Akçay	Istanbul Naval Shipyard	

== See also ==
- Lists of ships of the Turkish Navy
