= List of shipwrecks in 1989 =

The list of shipwrecks in 1989 includes ships sunk, foundered, grounded, or otherwise lost during 1989.

table of contents
1989
Jan	Feb	Mar	Apr
May	Jun	Jul	Aug
Sep	Oct	Nov	Dec
Unknown date

== January ==
=== 1 January ===
List of shipwrecks: 1 January 1989
Ship	State	Description
Justo Rufino Barrios II	Guatemala	The ferry sank in Amatique Bay whilst under tow of a Guatemalan Navy vessel with the loss of 67 lives.

=== 6 January ===
List of shipwrecks: 6 January 1989
Ship	State	Description
Miki Miki	United States	During a voyage from Cook Inlet to Seward, Alaska, the 126-foot (38.4 m) fishing vessel was abandoned 10 nautical miles (19 km; 12 mi) off the Kenai Peninsula on the south-central coast of Alaska after she sprang a leak. A United States Coast Guard helicopter rescued her entire crew of four. She was last seen drifting northwest and was presumed to have sunk.

=== 7 January ===
List of shipwrecks: 7 January 1989
Ship	State	Description
Lavia	Panama	The cruise ship burned and sank while moored in Hong Kong Harbour. She later was refloated and scrapped.

=== 10 January ===
List of shipwrecks: 10 January 1989
Ship	State	Description
Alament	United States	The 40-foot (12.2 m) troller caught fire, ran aground, and sank off Big Gravanski Island (57°08′00″N 135°25′30″W) in Southeast Alaska near Sitka, Alaska. The only person aboard perished.
Olympic	United States	The 80-foot (24.4 m) crab-fishing vessel sank in the Bering Sea 80 nautical miles (150 km; 92 mi) north of Dutch Harbor, Alaska.

=== 11 January ===
List of shipwrecks: 11 January 1989
Ship	State	Description
Chil Bo San No. 6	South Korea	After she broke a propeller, the 285-foot (86.9 m) fishing trawler drifted ashore on the west coast of Unalaska Island in the Aleutian Islands 2 nautical miles (3.7 km; 2.3 mi) south of Spray Cape (53°36′50″N 167°09′20″W). Two United States Coast Guard helicopters and a lifeboat from Chil Bo San No. 6's sister ship, the fishing trawler Pung Yang Ho (South Korea), rescued her crew of 54. Chil Bo San No. 6 later was washed over a reef and settled on rocks in a small cove.

=== 14 January ===
List of shipwrecks: 14 January 1989
Ship	State	Description
Morning Star	United States	The 42-foot (12.8 m) fishing vessel capsized and sank with the loss of one life in Uyak Bay (57°48′N 154°04′W) on the coast of Kodiak Island, Alaska. There was one survivor.

=== 18 January ===
List of shipwrecks: 18 January 1989
Ship	State	Description
Kamran	Iran	The Channel Tanker foundered in the Persian Gulf off Abu Musa, United Arab Emirates (25°50′N 55°22′E). She was on a voyage from Dubai to a port in Iran.

=== 21 January ===
List of shipwrecks: 21 January 1989
Ship	State	Description
USS Muliphen	United States Navy	The decommissioned Andromeda-class attack cargo ship was sunk as an artificial reef off Fort Pierce, Florida, or 16.5 miles (26.6 km) off Port St. Lucie, Florida. at 27°24.331′N 80°00.337′W.

=== 26 January ===
List of shipwrecks: 26 January 1989
Ship	State	Description
Tidings	United States	The 51-foot (15.5 m) fishing vessel sank without loss of life in the Gulf of Alaska off Cape Chiniak (57°37′N 152°10′W) on Kodiak Island.

=== 29 January ===
List of shipwrecks: 29 January 1989
Ship	State	Description
Vestfjord	United States	During a voyage from Seattle, Washington, to Dutch Harbor, Alaska, the 97-foot (29.6 m) crab fishing vessel sent out a distress signal reporting herself to be experiencing severe icing during a storm with 60-knot (110 km/h) winds and 30-foot (9.1 m) seas before sinking with the loss of her entire crew of six in the North Pacific Ocean about 30 nautical miles (56 km) south of the Trinity Islands.

== February ==
=== 15 February ===
List of shipwrecks: 15 February 1989
Ship	State	Description
Liberty	United States	The 71-foot (21.6 m) fish tender sank approximately 3 nautical miles (5.6 km; 3.5 mi) off Cape Barnabas. (53°09′N 152°53′W) on the south-central coast of Alaska less than 10 minutes after her lazarette began to flood. Her crew of four survived.
Maassluis	Netherlands	The tanker sank during heavy weather in the Mediterranean Sea near Skikda, Algeria, with the loss of 27 of her 29 crew members.

=== 22 February 1989 ===
List of shipwrecks: 22 February 1989
Ship	State	Description
Cecil Angola	Panama	The cargo ship foundered in the Atlantic Ocean with the loss of all seventeen crew.

== March ==
=== 3 March ===
List of shipwrecks: 3 March 1989
Ship	State	Description
Ocean Hope II	United States	After sending a final radio message late on 2 March, the 108-foot (32.9 m) longline halibut fishing vessel and her entire crew of four disappeared in a storm in the Shelikof Strait between the Kodiak Archipelago and the mainland of Alaska.

=== 5 March ===
List of shipwrecks: 5 March 1989
Ship	State	Description
Spencer II	United States	The 48-foot (14.6 m) longline fishing vessel ran aground and sank without loss of life in Port Houghton (57°19′N 133°30′W) in Stephens Passage in the Alexander Archipelago in Southeast Alaska.

=== 13 March ===
List of shipwrecks: 13 March 1989
Ship	State	Description
Perintis	Indonesia	The coaster foundered in the English Channel 35 nautical miles (65 km) off Guernsey, Channel Islands.
Secil Japan	Panama	The cargo ship ran aground at Hell's Mouth, Cornwall, United Kingdom with the loss of one of her sixteen crew. Survivors were rescued by helicopter.

=== 18 March ===
List of shipwrecks: 18 March 1989
Ship	State	Description
Admiral Land	United States	The 82-foot (25 m) fish processor sank in Sumner Strait in the Alexander Archipelago in Southeast Alaska after a fire broke out in her engine room and went out of control.

=== 19 March ===
List of shipwrecks: 19 March 1989
Ship	State	Description
Masagusar	Liberia	The tanker sank off the coast of Japan having caught fire on 13 March. All 23 crew were reported as missing.

=== 21 March ===
List of shipwrecks: 21 March 1989
Ship	State	Description
Marine View	United States	The 82-foot (25 m) fishing vessel ran aground and sank in Kah Shakes Cove (55°02′40″N 130°59′15″W) in Southeast Alaska. Her crew of three survived.

=== 24 March ===
List of shipwrecks: 24 March 1989
Ship	State	Description
Exxon Valdez	United States	Exxon Valdez The 209,200-ton very large crude carrier ran aground on Bligh Reef in Prince William Sound, Alaska, while carrying approximately 210,000 m^{3} (1.3 million bbl) of crude oil. A major oil spill resulted. Exxon Valdez was salvaged, renamed Exxon Mediterranean, and returned to service.

=== 26 March ===
List of shipwrecks: 26 March 1989
Ship	State	Description
Terminator	United States	The fishing vessel was wrecked on Saint Paul Island in the Bering Sea. She was scrapped in situ.

=== 28 March ===
List of shipwrecks: 28 March 1989
Ship	State	Description
Little Bear	United States	The 90-foot (27.4 m) fishing trawler sank in the Gulf of Alaska 25 nautical miles (46 km; 29 mi) to 30 nautical miles (56 km; 35 mi) off Cape Chiniak (57°37′N 152°10′W) on the coast of Kodiak Island, Alaska. Her crew of four was rescued from a life raft.

=== 30 March ===
List of shipwrecks: 30 March 1989
Ship	State	Description
Melissa K	United States	The 24-foot (7.3 m) herring-fishing vessel ran aground in bad weather at Survey Point (55°00′45″N 131°29′15″W) on Annette Island in the Gravina Islands in the Alexander Archipelago in Southeast Alaska and broke up on the rocks.

== April ==
=== 7 April ===
List of shipwrecks: 7 April 1989
Ship	State	Description
K-278 Komsomolets	Soviet Navy	The Project 685 Plavnik (NATO reporting name: Mike-class) nuclear-powered attack submarine sank in the Barents Sea (73°43′18″N 13°16′54″E) with the loss of 42 of her 67 crew.

=== 10 April ===
List of shipwrecks: 10 April 1989
Ship	State	Description
Mineral Europe	Hong Kong	Collided off Singapore with Ambition (Liberia) and was damaged, losing some cargo. Later repaired and returned to service.

=== 23 April ===
List of shipwrecks: 23 April 1989
Ship	State	Description
Nils S	United States	The retired 122-foot (37.2 m) fishing trawler and clam dredger was scuttled as an artificial reef in 90 feet (27 m) of water in the North Atlantic Ocean east of Ocean City, New Jersey, at 39°13.610′N 074°13.045′W.

=== 25 April ===
List of shipwrecks: 25 April 1989
Ship	State	Description
USS Parsons	United States Navy	The decommissioned Forrest Sherman-class guided-missile destroyer was sunk as a target.

=== 27 April ===
List of shipwrecks: 27 April 1989
Ship	State	Description
Kachemak Lady	United States	The fishing vessel sank off Chugach Island (59°07′N 151°40′W) off the south-central coast of Alaska. Her crew survived.

=== 28 April ===
List of shipwrecks: 28 April 1989
Ship	State	Description
Polar Express	United States	The fishing vessel sank off Cape Cleare (59°46′25″N 147°54′30″W) on the south-central coast of Alaska.

=== 30 April ===
List of shipwrecks: 30 April 1989
Ship	State	Description
Legend	United States	The 42-foot (12.8 m) fishing vessel was found capsized in the lower part of Cook Inlet on the south-central coast of Alaska. Her entire crew of four was lost.

== May ==
=== 6 May ===
List of shipwrecks: 6 May 1989
Ship	State	Description
South Wind	United States	The tug capsized in Cook Inlet on the south-central coast of Alaska after striking the mooring line of the barge she was towing. The buoy tender USCGC Sorrel (United States Coast Guard) rescued her entire crew of three.

=== 11 May ===
List of shipwrecks: 11 May 1989
Ship	State	Description
Melody	United States	The fishing vessel capsized and was lost near Homer, Alaska.

=== 14 May ===
List of shipwrecks: 14 May 1989
Ship	State	Description
Oceanus	United States	The 52-foot (15.8 m) longline fishing vessel sank in bad weather at the entrance to Aialik Bay (59°40′N 149°34′W) on the south-central coast of Alaska. Her crew of five survived.

=== 15 May ===
List of shipwrecks: 15 May 1989
Ship	State	Description
Teal	United States	The 65-foot (19.8 m) fishing tender sank in the Gulf of Alaska near Spruce Cape (57°49′15″N 152°20′00″W) north of Kodiak, Alaska, after a seam opened in her hull. Five people and a dog were rescued from Teal.

=== 16 May ===
List of shipwrecks: 16 May 1989
Ship	State	Description
Debbie Ann	United States	The 32-foot (9.8 m) longline halibut fishing vessel ran aground, capsized, and sank in Roller Bay (55°31′N 133°46′W) in Southeast Alaska. The two people aboard survived.

=== 24 May ===
List of shipwrecks: 24 May 1989
Ship	State	Description
Moby Dick	United States	The 64-foot (19.5 m) passenger vessel sank at her moorings somewhere in the Pacific Northwest region of the United States. She subsequently was refloated and placed in storage at Everett, Washington, then eventually scrapped.

== June ==
=== 1 June ===
List of shipwrecks: 1 June 1989
Ship	State	Description
Nukanu	United States	The fishing vessel sank in the Gulf of Alaska off the Copper River Flats on the south-central coast of Alaska.

=== 2 June ===
List of shipwrecks: 2 June 1989
Ship	State	Description
Fleet Commander	United States	While hauling a full load of lumber from Kenai to Chinitna (59.8531°N 153.0627°W), Alaska, on the west side of Cook Inlet, the 32-foot (9.8 m) salmon-fishing vessel capsized and sank in bad weather southeast of Chisik Island (58°57′N 152°15′W) on the south-central coast of Alaska, killing a woman on board. The man who owned and operated Fleet Commander survived by abandoning ship in a life raft and drifting to shore 27 nautical miles (50 km; 31 mi) away in Dry Bay (59.1292°N 138.5300°W).

=== 3 June ===
List of shipwrecks: 3 June 1989
Ship	State	Description
Dorothy	United States	After the retired 65-foot (19.8 m) tug was cut into pieces, she was dumped in the North Atlantic Ocean as an artificial reef 1.6 nautical miles (3.0 km; 1.8 mi) off Sea Bright, New Jersey, in 60 feet (18 m) of water at 40°21.555′N 073°56.103′W.
V. L. Keegan	United States	After the retired 110-foot (33.5 m) tanker was cut into pieces, she was dumped in the North Atlantic Ocean as an artificial reef 1.6 nautical miles (3.0 km; 1.8 mi) off Sea Bright, New Jersey, in 60 feet (18 m) of water at 40°21.525′N 073°56.110′W.

=== 4 June ===
List of shipwrecks: 4 June 1989
Ship	State	Description
Ostwind	United States	The 85-foot (26 m) former German racing yacht was scuttled 1 1/2 miles (2.4 km) off Miami Beach, Florida. She was scuttled in the wrong place, on a sensitive reef. Later she was partially refloated, towed to the proper place while still underwater and resunk.

=== 13 June ===
List of shipwrecks: 13 June 1989
Ship	State	Description
Evanick	United States	The 34-foot (10.4 m) longline halibut-fishing vessel sank off Cape Chiniak (57°37′N 152°10′W) on Kodiak Island near Kodiak, Alaska. A United States Coast Guard helicopter rescued her entire crew of five.
Vostok	United States	The fishing vessel sank off the coast of Alaska near Middleton Island.

=== 16 June ===
List of shipwrecks: 16 June 1989
Ship	State	Description
Virginian	United States	The 38-foot (11.6 m) salmon fishing vessel burned at Grass Island (60°17′30″N 145°11′30″W) in the Gulf of Alaska.

=== 18 June ===
List of shipwrecks: 18 June 1989
Ship	State	Description
Lela May	United States	The fishing vessel sank off Chilkat Island (59°02′N 135°16′W) in Southeast Alaska. Her crew of four survived.

=== 19 June ===
List of shipwrecks: 19 June 1989
Ship	State	Description
Maxim Gorkiy	Soviet Union	The cruise ship hit an ice floe near Svalbard, Norway. Her passengers evacuated by lifeboat. The ship later was repaired and returned to service.

=== 20 June ===
List of shipwrecks: 20 June 1989
Ship	State	Description
Sound Investor	United States	The 40-foot (12.2 m) salmon-fishing vessel capsized suddenly and sank at Valdez, Alaska, killing one of the crew members on board.

=== 23 June ===
List of shipwrecks: 23 June 1989
Ship	State	Description
Lady Rhoda	Cyprus	The cargo ship collided with Meloviya (Morocco) and sank in the Atlantic Ocean off Vigo, Spain, with the loss of six of her crew. Survivors were rescued by Meloviya.
World Prodigy	Greece	The motor ship struck a reef at the mouth of the Narragansett Bay in Rhode Island, spilling several hundred thousand gallons of fuel oil; she was later refloated and repaired.

=== 27 June ===
List of shipwrecks: 27 June 1989
Ship	State	Description
Coleman I	United States	The 45-foot (13.7 m) steel-hulled barge was scuttled as an artificial reef in the North Atlantic Ocean 1.6 nautical miles (3.0 km; 1.8 mi) off Sea Bright, New Jersey, in 50 feet (15 m) of water at 40°21.060′N 073°56.125′W.

=== Unknown date ===
List of shipwrecks: Unknown date 1989
Ship	State	Description
USS Blenny	United States Navy	The Balao-class submarine was sunk in the Atlantic Ocean off Ocean City, Maryland, as an artificial reef.

== July ==
=== 5 July ===
List of shipwrecks: 5 July 1989
Ship	State	Description
Marie Mae	United States	The 32-foot (9.8 m) salmon-fishing vessel capsized and sank in Cook Inlet 3 nautical miles (5.6 km; 3.5 mi) off Ninilchik, Alaska. Her crew of two survived.

=== 9 July ===
List of shipwrecks: 9 July 1989
Ship	State	Description
Rain X Challenger	United States	During an attempt on Lake Jackson in Sebring, Florida, to break the world water speed record, the hydroplane somersaulted at a speed of more than 350 mph (560 km/h) and broke apart, fatally injuring its pilot, Craig Arfons.
Rifta	United States	The fishing vessel capsized and sank in Bristol Bay off the coast of Alaska.

=== 11 July ===
List of shipwrecks: 11 July 1989
Ship	State	Description
City of Poros	Greece	Hijacked by terrorists and set on fire by grenades. Nine killed and 60 injured. Fire extinguished by salvage tugs Alcyon and Pegasus, ship towed to Piraeus.

=== 12 July ===
List of shipwrecks: 12 July 1989
Ship	State	Description
Winthrop	United States	The retired 120-foot (36.6 m) fishing trawler was scuttled as an artificial reef in the North Atlantic Ocean off Cape May, New Jersey, in 60 feet (18 m) of water at 38°50.825′N 074°43.312′W.

=== 22 July ===
List of shipwrecks: 22 July 1989
Ship	State	Description
Midnight Sun	United States	The 38-foot (11.6 m) salmon-fishing vessel sank in Cook Inlet on the south-central coast of Alaska. Her crew of four survived.

=== 25 July ===
List of shipwrecks: 25 July 1989
Ship	State	Description
Kouris	Cyprus	The liquid petroleum gas carrier was driven onto the Merries Reef. She consequently came ashore at Cronulla, New South Wales, Australia. Kouris was refloated on 27 July.

== August ==
=== 8 August ===
List of shipwrecks: 8 August 1989
Ship	State	Description
Gaylene	United States	The 40-foot (12.2 m) salmon troller sank off Biorka Island in Southeast Alaska after her cargo shifted. Her crew of three survived.

=== 10 August ===
List of shipwrecks: 10 August 1989
Ship	State	Description
Kamikaze	United States	The 32-foot (9.8 m) fishing vessel was abandoned after she ran aground in bad weather off Seguam Island in the Aleutian Islands. Her crew of four survived.

=== 12 August ===
List of shipwrecks: 12 August 1989
Ship	State	Description
Gray Fox	United States	The 36-foot (11 m) fishing vessel burned and sank without loss of life in Alaska's Kodiak Archipelago between Ugak Island (57.6319°N 152.1583°W) and Narrow Cape (57.4269°N 152.3289°W).
Ocean Pacific	United States	The 166-foot (50.6 m) salmon processing ship capsized and sank without loss of life at her moorings in 132 feet (40 m) of water in Tongass Narrows in the Alexander Archipelago in Southeast Alaska.

=== 15 August ===
List of shipwrecks: 15 August 1989
Ship	State	Description
Sequel	United States	The 67-foot (20.4 m) fishing trawler capsized and sank while transferring ballast water in Prince William Sound off the south-central coast of Alaska. Only one of her four crew members survived.

=== 19 August ===
List of shipwrecks: 19 August 1989
Ship	State	Description
Komsomelets Turkmenii	Soviet Navy	The Zhenya-class minesweeper was lost in an explosion.

=== 20 August ===
List of shipwrecks: 20 August 1989
Ship	State	Description
Marchioness	United Kingdom	The pleasure steamer sank in the River Thames at London, England, with the loss of 51 lives after colliding with the dredger Bowbelle (United Kingdom).

=== 21 August ===
List of shipwrecks: 21 August
Ship	State	Description
Bassam B.	Lebanon	Lebanese Civil War: The cargo ship was sunk by a mine at Sidon, Lebanon .

=== 29 August ===
List of shipwrecks: 29 August
Ship	State	Description
Sun Shield	Saint Vincent and the Grenadines	Lebanese Civil War: The tanker was damaged off Jounieh, Lebanon by a Syrian Project 205U missile boat, sinking on 1 September in Jounieh Bay. Seven crewmen were killed, including her master, two were wounded and two were reported missing.

=== Unknown date ===
List of shipwrecks: Unknown date
Ship	State	Description
Aloil	Malta	Lebanese Civil War: The tanker was sunk off Jounieh, Lebanon by a Syrian warship on 7 or 9 August.

== September ==
=== 8 September ===
List of shipwrecks: 8 September 1989
Ship	State	Description
Jackie Jay	United States	The 44-foot (13.4 m) longline halibut-fishing vessel capsized and sank, at a location identified in the wreck report as Ursus Cove in the Barren Islands. Her crew of four abandoned ship in a life raft and was rescued from the raft four days later. Jackie Jay presumably sank in Ursus Cove (59°32′N 153°40′W) northwest of Saint Augustine Island (59°22′N 153°26′W) in Kamishak Bay on the south-central coast of Alaska, and the Barren Islands in the Gulf of Alaska probably are the location of her crew's rescue.
Rainy Dawn	United States	The 32-foot (9.8 m) longline fishing vessel sank in the Gulf of Alaska off Afognak Island in the Kodiak Archipelago 22 nautical miles (41 km) northeast of Kodiak Island when her deck flooded after her scuppers became clogged with fish. Her entire crew of four survived.

=== 10 September ===
List of shipwrecks: 10 September 1989
Ship	State	Description
Mogosoaia	Romania	Sinking of the Mogoșoaia: The ferry collided with the tug Peter Karaminchev (Bulgaria) in the River Danube near Galați, Romania. At least 151 people were killed.

=== 14 September ===
List of shipwrecks: 14 September 1989
Ship	State	Description
Tresco	United Kingdom	The coaster foundered in the Atlantic Ocean 30 nautical miles (56 km) southwest of the Wolf Rock. Seven crew were rescued by helicopter.

=== 15 September ===
List of shipwrecks: 17 September 1989
Ship	State	Description
Gecko	United States	Gecko Hurricane Marilyn: The yacht was driven ashore on Saint Thomas, U.S. Virgin Islands.

=== 17 September ===
List of shipwrecks: 17 September 1989
Ship	State	Description
Jenny	United States	The 52-foot (15.8 m) fishing vessel sank near Seal Rock (59°31′25″N 149°37′32″W) on the south-central coast of Alaska southwest of Seward. Her crew of two survived.

=== 18 September ===
List of shipwrecks: 18 September 1989
Ship	State	Description
Marlago	Panama	Hurricane Hugo: The 471-foot (144 m) ro-ro container ship was scuttled or driven ashore at Krum Bay, Saint Thomas, U.S. Virgin Islands. On 2 August 2001, she was refloated and taken to the Dominican Republic, where she was expected to be converted to a barge.

=== 20 September ===
List of shipwrecks: 29 September 1989
Ship	State	Description
Brookings	United States Navy	USS Brookings Hurricane Hugo: The Haskell-class attack transport was driven ashore on Isla Cabras, Puerto Rico. Partially dismantled in situ, she was refloated on 28 March 1992 and was scuttled three days later.

=== 23 September ===
List of shipwrecks: 23 September 1989
Ship	State	Description
Steadfast	United States	The tanker tug capsized and sank with the loss of her entire crew of three while towing a 110-foot (33.5 m) barge in the Gulf of Alaska off the southwest end of Kayak Island off the south-central coast of Alaska.

== October ==
=== 9 October ===
List of shipwrecks: 9 October 1989
Ship	State	Description
Trilby	United States	The 43-foot (13.1 m) longline halibut-fishing vessel sank after striking a rock in Salisbury Sound in the Alexander Archipelago in Southeast Alaska. Her four-person crew was rescued from a life raft.

=== 11 October ===
List of shipwrecks: 11 October 1989
Ship	State	Description
A. C. Wescoat	United States	The retired 60-foot (18.3 m) barge was scuttled as an artificial reef in 80 feet (24 m) of water in the North Atlantic Ocean east of Atlantic City, New Jersey, at 39°15.540′N 074°14.691′W.

=== 17 October ===
List of shipwrecks: 17 October 1989
Ship	State	Description
Tiny	United States	The 65-foot (19.8 m) fishing vessel flooded, capsized, and sank without loss of life in Bristol Bay south of Cape Newenham (58°39′00″N 162°10′30″W) in Alaska.

=== 18 October ===
List of shipwrecks: 18 October 1989
Ship	State	Description
Lena May	United States	The 40-foot (12.2 m) fishing vessel sank in heavy seas off Glacier Point, Alaska; the wreck report does not specify which of many Alaskan locations named Glacier Point it refers to. Another vessel rescued her crew of three.
Sea Raider	United States	The 38-foot (11.6 m) longline halibut-fishing vessel capsized and sank in heavy seas in the Gulf of Alaska off Ugak Island (57°23′N 152°17′W) in the Kodiak Archipelago with the loss of one crewman. Her three survivors were rescued from her overturned hull.

=== 25 October ===
List of shipwrecks: 25 October 1989
Ship	State	Description
Mary L	United States	The 38-foot (11.6 m) fishing vessel sank in Chiniak Bay (57°42′N 152°20′W) near Kodiak, Alaska, after her lazarette flooded. Her crew of two survived.

=== 29 October ===
List of shipwrecks: 29 October 1989
Ship	State	Description
Murree	Pakistan	The cargo ship foundered in the English Channel off Start Point, Devon, United Kingdom. All forty people on board were rescued by a Royal Navy search and rescue Sea King helicopters, of 771 Naval Air Squadron flying from RNAS Culdrose.

=== 30 October ===
List of shipwrecks: 30 October 1989
Ship	State	Description
Vicky Pat	United States	The retired 67-foot (20.4 m) fishing trawler and clam dredger was scuttled as an artificial reef in 80 feet (24 m) of water in the North Atlantic Ocean east of Ocean City, New Jersey, at 39°15.255′N 074°14.818′W.

=== Unknown date ===
List of shipwrecks: Unknown date October 1989
Ship	State	Description
BM-503	Nicaraguan Navy	The minesweeper was sunk in a hurricane.
HMS Spartan	Royal Navy	The Swiftsure-class submarine ran aground off the west coast of Scotland. She was refloated, repaired, and returned to service.
Unknown patrol boats	Nicaraguan Navy	Two project 1400ME patrol boats were sunk in a hurricane.

== November ==
=== 2 November ===
List of shipwrecks: 2 November 1989
Ship	State	Description
Ibis	Honduras	The cargo ship capsized in Tor Bay, Devon, United Kingdom. She sank on 5 November.

=== 20 November ===
List of shipwrecks: 20 November 1989
Ship	State	Description
Despo	Greece	The cargo ship sank off Zakynthos with the loss of one of her seven crew.
Neptune II	United States	The 58-foot (18 m), 84-gross register ton fishing vessel sank without loss of life in 85 feet (26 m) of water in the Atlantic Ocean 5 nautical miles (9.3 km; 5.8 mi) south of Sakonnet Point on the coast of Rhode Island at 41°23.161′N 071°11.135′W.

== December ==
=== 2 December ===
List of shipwrecks: 2 December 1989
Ship	State	Description
Bronx Queen	United States	The 112-foot (34.1 m) fishing boat – a converted United States Navy submarine chaser – sank in 37 feet (11 m) of water off Breezy Point, Queens, New York, 15 minutes after a structural failure occurred in her after hull due to improper modifications. The United States Coast Guard rescued all 19 passengers and crew from the water, but two of them later died in the hospital.

=== 4 December ===
List of shipwrecks: 4 December 1989
Ship	State	Description
USCGC Mesquite	United States Coast Guard	USCGC Mesquite. The buoy tender ran aground on a reef off of the Keweenaw Peninsula in Lake Superior. Originally intended to be salvaged, she was damaged further by winter storms and subsequently sunk as an artificial reef the next year.

=== 8 December ===
List of shipwrecks: 8 December 1989
Ship	State	Description
Capitaine Torres	Vanuatu	The cargo ship sank in the Gulf of St. Lawrence with the loss of all hands.
Johanna B	Panama	The cargo ship sank in the Gulf of St. Lawrence with the loss of all hands.

=== 9 December ===
List of shipwrecks: 9 December 1989
Ship	State	Description
Angara	United States	The 42-foot (12.8 m) crab-fishing vessel capsized in the Shelikof Strait off Shuyak Island in Alaska's Kodiak Archipelago. Her crew of two perished.

=== 17 December ===
List of shipwrecks: 17 December 1989
Ship	State	Description
Arklow Victor	Ireland	The cargo ship foundered in the Bay of Biscay with the loss of one of her six crew. Survivors were rescued by a French helicopter.

=== 19 December ===
List of shipwrecks: 19 December 1989
Ship	State	Description
Kharg 5	Iran	The supertanker exploded and was abandoned in the Atlantic Ocean off the coast of Morocco. All 32 crew were rescued by a Soviet merchant ship.

== Unknown date ==
List of shipwrecks: Unknown date 1989
Ship	State	Description
HMS Leander	Royal Navy	The decommissioned Leander-class frigate was sunk as a target by a Sea Dart missile, three Exocet missiles, and one gravity bomb.
Marie	United States	After she was cut into pieces and mixed with pieces of three barges, the retired 95-foot (29 m) tug was dumped into the North Atlantic Ocean 3.6 nautical miles (6.7 km; 4.1 mi) off Sea Girt, New Jersey, to form an artificial reef.
Miller	United States	The retired 90-foot (27.4 m) barge was scuttled as an artificial reef in the North Atlantic Ocean 5.1 nautical miles (9.4 km; 5.9 mi) off Spray Beach, New Jersey, at 39°33.621′N 074°06.528′W.
Unidentified barge	United States	After she was cut into pieces and mixed with pieces of two other barges and the tug Marie (United States), the retired 70-foot (21.3 m) barge was dumped into the North Atlantic Ocean 3.6 nautical miles (6.7 km; 4.1 mi) off Sea Girt, New Jersey, to form an artificial reef.
Unidentified barge	United States	After she was cut into pieces and mixed with pieces of two other barges and the tug Marie (United States), the retired 80-foot (24.4 m) barge was dumped into the North Atlantic Ocean 3.6 nautical miles (6.7 km; 4.1 mi) off Sea Girt, New Jersey, to form an artificial reef.
Unidentified barge	United States	After she was cut into pieces and mixed with pieces of two other barges and the tug Marie (United States), the retired 140-foot (42.7 m) barge was dumped into the North Atlantic Ocean 3.6 nautical miles (6.7 km; 4.1 mi) off Sea Girt, New Jersey, to form an artificial reef.
Unknown speed boats	Eritrean Liberation Front	Eritrean War of Independence: Beginning in late 1988 through 1989, eight speed boats were sunk by Ethiopian Mi-35 attack helicopters.
YO-257	United States Navy	The decommissioned yard oiler was sunk 2 nautical miles (3.7 km) off Waikiki, Honolulu, Oahu, Hawaii, to form an artificial reef.
