= Japanese ship Yashiro =

Two ships of the Japanese Navy have been named Yashiro:

- Japanese escort ship Yashiro, a Mikura-class escort ship launched in 1944 and ceded to China in 1947
- JDS Yashiro, a minesweeper launched in 1955 and struck in 1981
