= Sonya-class minesweeper =

Soviet coastal minesweeper class

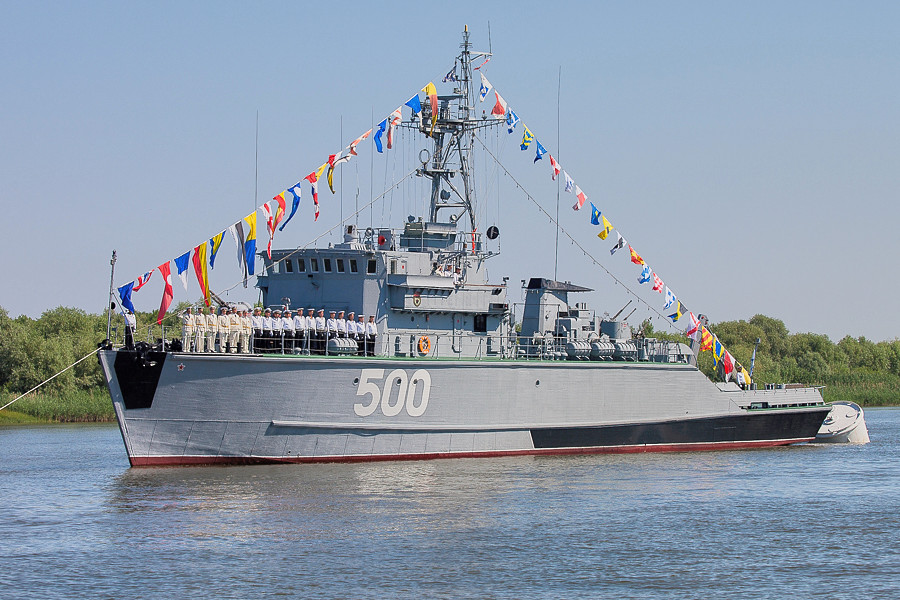
- Russian Navy minesweeper German Ugryumov in 2015.

Class overview
- Name: Sonya class (Project 1265)
- Operators: Soviet Navy; Russian Navy; Russian Coast Guard; Ukrainian Navy; Azerbaijani Navy; Bulgarian Navy; Cuban Revolutionary Navy; Syrian Navy; Vietnam People's Navy
- Preceded by: Zhenya class
- Succeeded by: Alexandrit class
- Built: 1971–1991
- In commission: 1971–present
- Completed: 72
- Retired: ?

General characteristics
- Type: coastal minesweeper
- Displacement: 400 tons standard, 450 tons full load
- Length: 48.8 m (160 ft)
- Beam: 8.8 m (29 ft)
- Draught: 2.1 m (6 ft 11 in)
- Propulsion: 2 shaft diesel engines 2,400 hp (1,800 kW)
- Speed: 15 knots (28 km/h)
- Range: 3,000 nautical miles (5,556.0 km) at 10 knots (19 km/h)
- Endurance: 10 days
- Complement: 43
- Sensors & processing systems: Radar: Spin Trough; Sonar: MG-89
- Armament: 1 × twin 30 mm guns; 1 × twin 25 mm guns; Sweeps GKT, PEMT-2, ST-2

The Sonya class, Soviet designation Project 1265 Yakhont, are a group of minesweepers built for the Soviet Navy and Soviet allies between 1971 and 1991.

== Design ==
The Sonya-class ships are wooden hulled coastal minehunters, built as successors to the Vanya class with new sweeps and more effective sonar. A central safe explosion proof area is fitted and all key systems can be remote controlled from there.

== Operators ==
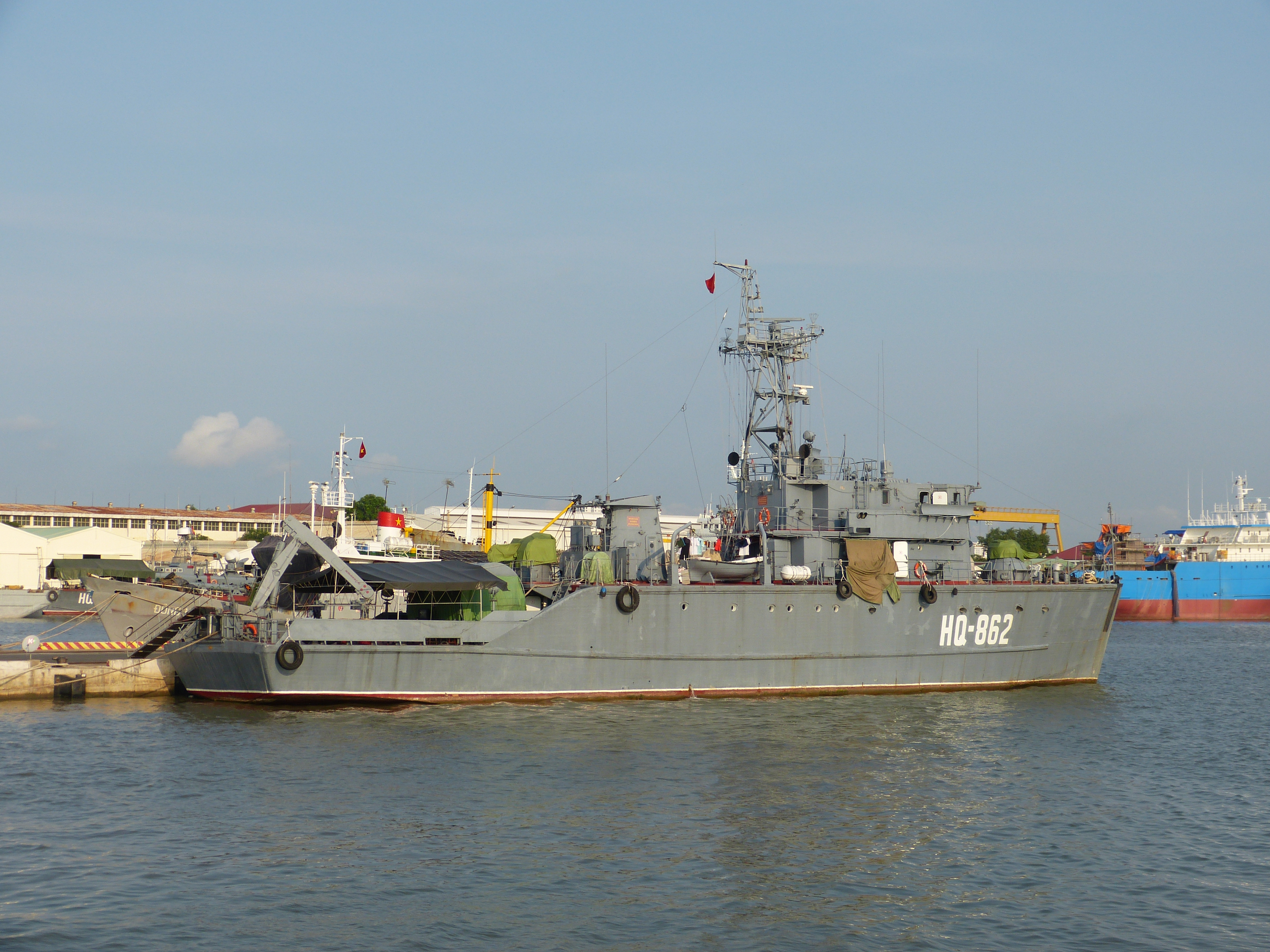
HQ-862, a Sonya-class minesweeper of Vietnam People's Navy

A total of 72 ships were built by Uliis yard in the Vladivostok and Avangard yards in Petrozavodsk between 1971 and 1991. One ship, BT-730, was lost in an accident in 1985. Another unit collided with a Swedish surveillance ship HSwMS Orion east of Gotland in the Baltic Sea in November 1985.

Russian Navy

- c. 15 ships in the navy; 1 transferred to the Coast Guard (as of 2026)
  - Baltic Fleet – 4
  - Northern Fleet – 6
  - Pacific Fleet – 5
  - Caspian Flotilla – 2 + 1 (Astrakhanets) transferred to the Coast Guard as a border patrol boat

Ukrainian Navy

- 2 ships in former service.
  - U330 Melitopol (Decommissioned 2012)
  - U331 Mariupol (Decommissioned 2013)

Azerbaijani Navy

- 2 ships in service.

Bulgarian Navy

- 4 ships transferred.
  - Briz (61) (Бриз - Sea breeze) decommisioned 1 december 2025
  - Shkval (62) (Шквал - Squall)
  - Priboi (63) (Прибой - Breaking wave)
  - Shtorm (64) (Щорм, "sea storm") decomissioned

Cuban Revolutionary Navy

- 4 ships transferred.

Syrian Navy

- 1 ship transferred.

Vietnam People's Navy

- 4 ships transferred in 1975 .

== See also ==
- List of ships of the Soviet Navy
- List of ships of Russia by project number
