= Izumrud =

Izumrud (means emerald in Russian) may refer to:

- Russian cruiser Izumrud, a protected cruiser of the Imperial Russian Navy
- Izumrud-class cruiser, a series of Russian protected cruisers
- Izumrud (clipper), a clipper of the Imperial Russian Navy
- Project 1252 'Izumrud', or Zhenya-class minesweeper by NATO classification, class of Soviet minesweepers
- An Rubin-class patrol boat, reportedly sunk in 2026.
- FC Izumrud-Neftyanik Timashyovsk, Russia
- VC Lokomotiv-Izumrud, Russia
