= Kasado-class minesweeper =

Coastal minesweepers of JMSDF

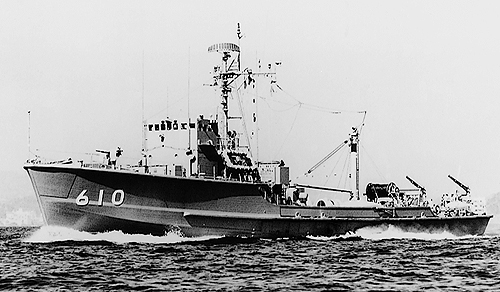
- JDS Tatara

Class overview
- Name: Kasado
- Builders: NKK, Keihin; Hitachi, Kanagawa
- Preceded by: Yashiro class
- Succeeded by: Takami class
- Built: 1957-1967
- In commission: 1958-1990
- Planned: 26
- Completed: 26
- Retired: 26

General characteristics
- Type: Minesweeper
- Displacement: 340 t (330 long tons) standard; 360 t (350 long tons) full load
- Length: 45.5 m (149 ft 3 in)
- Beam: 8.4 m (27 ft 7 in)
- Draft: 2.3 m (7 ft 7 in)
- Depth: 3.9 m (12 ft 10 in)
- Propulsion: 2 × Mitsubishi YV10Z 15/20 diesel electric engines; 2 × shafts
- Speed: 14 kn (26 km/h; 16 mph)
- Complement: 39
- Sensors & processing systems: (Kasado and Shisaka); OPS-3 surface-search radar; (Kanawa until Rebun); OPS-4D surface-search radar; (Amami until Katsura); ZQS-1 sonar; Oropesa
- Armament: 1 × single Oerlikon 20mm gun

The Kasado class is a class of coastal minesweepers of the Japan Maritime Self-Defense Force.

== Development ==
During the Pacific War, a large number of mines were laid in the waters near Japan by both Japan and the United States, which greatly hindered shipping including coastal areas at the end of the war, so the need to deal with this was urgent. It was a thing. For this reason, the scavenging force was maintained even while the Imperial Japanese Navy was dismantled after the surrender of Japan, and was taken over by the 2nd Ministry of Demobilization on December 1, 1945. After that, minesweepers were absorbed by the Japan Coast Guard, which was established on August 1, 1952, and transferred to the Coastal Security Force.

Immediately after its inauguration, the guards have been aiming for domestic production of minesweepers. First, in 1953, the Atada-class minesweeper and JDS Yashiro were built with the characteristics of an actual ship experiment. Based on its achievements, this model was designed as the first mass-produced minesweeper after the war. In designing, it was aimed to have the same performance as the US Navy's Bluebird-class minesweeper (operated as a Yamashima-class minesweeper with the donation of four from 1954).

== Ships in the class ==
Pennant no.	Name	Builders	Laid down	Launched	Commissioned	Decommissioned	Home port
MSC-604	Kasado	Hitachi Zosen Corporation, Kanagawa	9 July 1957	19 March 1958	26 June 1958	27 March 1982	Yokosuka
MSC-605	Shisaka	Nippon Kokan, Keihin	20 July 1957	20 March 1958	16 August 1958	30 March 1983	Yokosuka
MSC-606	Kanawa	Hitachi Zosen Corporation, Kanagawa	25 August 1958	22 April 1959	24 July 1959	10 February 1984	Yokosuka
MSC-607	Sakito	Nippon Kokan, Keihin	16 August 1958	22 April 1959	25 August 1959	257 March 1982	Yokosuka
MSC-608	Habushi	Hitachi Zosen Corporation, Kanagawa	25 August 1958	19 June 1959	22 September 1959	4 September 1982	Yokosuka
MSC-609	Kouzu	Nippon Kokan, Keihin	24 March 1959	12 November 1959	26 February 1960	18 March 1981	Yokosuka
MSC-610	Tatara	Hitachi Zosen Corporation, Kanagawa	20 March 1959	14 January 1960	26 March 1960	13 March 1984	Yokosuka
MSC-611	Tsukumi	Nippon Kokan, Keihin	24 March 1959	12 January 1960	27 April 1960	30 March 1983	Yokosuka
MSC-612	Mikura	Hitachi Zosen Corporation, Kanagawa	30 March 1959	14 March 1960	27 May 1960	3 March 1989	Yokosuka
MSC-613	Shikine	Nippon Kokan, Keihin	12 January 1960	22 July 1960	15 November 1960	30 January 1984	Sasebo
MSC-614	Hirado	Hitachi Zosen Corporation, Kanagawa	14 March 1960	3 October 1960	17 December 1960	27 March 1985	Sasebo
MSC-615	Koshiki	Hitachi Zosen Corporation, Kanagawa	20 March 1961	6 November 1961	29 January 1961	18 March 1981	Ominato
MSC-616	Hotaka	Nippon Kokan, Keihin	22 March 1961	23 October 1961	24 February 1962	27 January 1983	Ominato
MSC-617	Karato	Nippon Kokan, Keihin	15 March 1962	11 December 1962	27 March 1963	7 September 1987	Yokosuka
MSC-618	Hario	Hitachi Zosen Corporation, Kanagawa	19 March 1962	10 December 1962	23 March 1963	27 March 1986	Yokosuka
MSC-619	Mutsure	Hitachi Zosen Corporation, Kanagawa	28 March 1963	16 December 1963	24 March 1963	4 June 1986	Yokosuka
MSC-620	Chiburi	Nippon Kokan, Keihin	27 March 1963	29 November 1963	25 March 1964	24 May 1986	Sasebo
MSC-621	Ōtsu	Nippon Kokan, Keihin	7 March 1964	5 November 1964	24 February 1965	16 December 1986	Ominato
MSC-622	Kudako	Hitachi Zosen Corporation, Kanagawa	17 February 1964	20 November 1964	24 March 1965	24 March 1987	Sasebo
MSC-623	Rishiri	Hitachi Zosen Corporation, Kanagawa	9 March 1965	22 November 1965	5 March 1966	10 March 1988	Ominato
MSC-624	Rebun	Nippon Kokan, Keihin	27 March 1965	7 December 1965	24 March 1966	24 March 1987	Ominato
MSC-625	Amami	Nippon Kokan, Keihin	10 March 1966	31 October 1966	6 March 1967	29 November 1989	Sasebo
MSC-626	Urume	Hitachi Zosen Corporation, Kanagawa	1 February 1966	12 November 1966	30 January 1967	17 November 1989	Sasebo
MSC-627	Minase	Hitachi Zosen Corporation, Kanagawa	1 February 1966	10 January 1967	25 March 1967	15 June 1990	Sasebo
MSC-628	Ibuki	Nippon Kokan, Keihin	27 February 1967	2 December 1967	27 February 1968	29 November 1989	Sasebo
MSC-629	Katsura	Nippon Kokan, Keihin	10 February 1967	18 September 1967	15 February 1968	14 May 1990	Maizuru

== See also ==
Equivalent minesweepers of the same era

- Ton class
- Dokkum class
- Vanya class
- Democrația class
- Agile class
