= Hatsushima-class minesweeper =

Coastal minesweepers of JMSDF

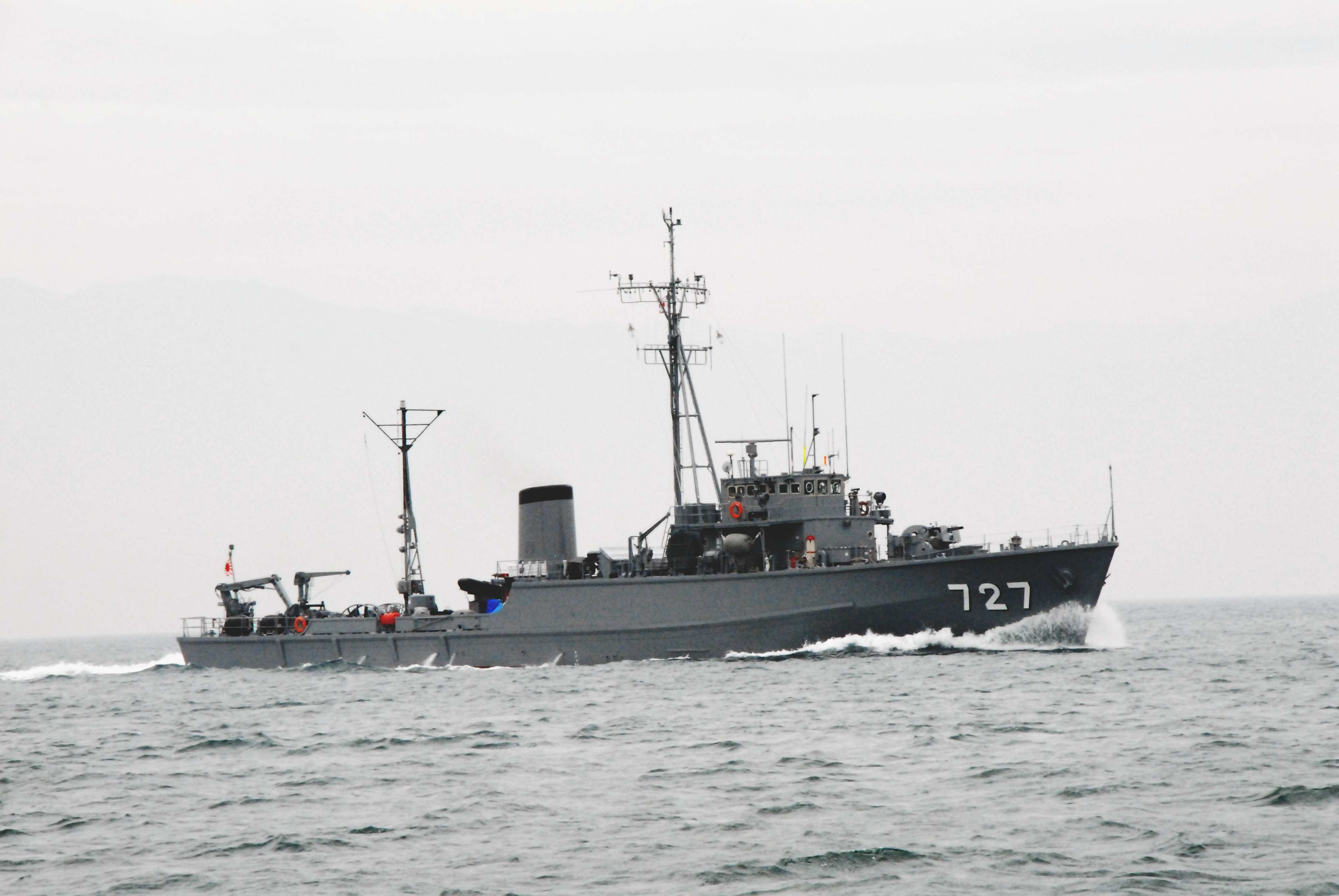
- JDS Sakushima

Class overview
- Name: Hatsushima
- Builders: NKK, Keihin; Hitachi, Kanagawa
- Preceded by: Takami class
- Succeeded by: Uwajima class
- Built: 1977-1989
- In commission: 1979-2013
- Planned: 23
- Completed: 23
- Retired: 23

General characteristics
- Type: Minesweeper
- Displacement: 440 t (430 long tons) standard; 520 t (510 long tons) full load
- Length: 55 m (180 ft 5 in)
- Beam: 9.4 m (30 ft 10 in)
- Draft: 2.5 m (8 ft 2 in)
- Depth: 4.2 m (13 ft 9 in)
- Propulsion: 2 × Mitsubishi 12ZC15 / 20I diesel electric engines; 2 × shafts
- Speed: 14 kn (26 km/h; 16 mph)
- Complement: 45
- Sensors & processing systems: OPS-9B surface-search radar; ZQS-2B sonar
- Armament: 1 × single Oerlikon 20mm gun

The Hatsushima class is a class of coastal minesweepers of the Japan Maritime Self-Defense Force.

== Development ==
The Maritime Self-Defense Force has introduced the mine sweeping capability of the Takami class minesweeper developed in the 3rd Defense Build-up Plan by installing the British ASDIC 193 and the ZQS-2 mine detector that introduced the technology. However, in minesweepers such as the same class, immediately after the introduction of mine sweeping technology, mine disposal depended on the underwater diver, and the danger was great.

For this reason, it has become necessary to reduce the risk of mine clearance by using a self-propelled / precursor-type mine disposal tool that is remotely controlled. In response to this, the medium-sized minesweeper in the 4th Defense Build-up Plan was to further improve its sweeping ability, and this type was built by this.

== Ships in the class ==
Pennant no.	Name	Builders	Laid down	Launched	Commissioned	Decommissioned	Home port
MSC-649	Hatsushima	Nippon Kokan, Keihin	6 December 1977	30 October 1978	30 March 1979	13 July 2001	Yokosuka
MSC-650	Ninoshima	Hitachi Zosen Corporation, Kanagawa	8 May 1978	7 August 1979	19 December 1979	23 May 2002	Kure
MSC-651	Miyajima	Nippon Kokan, Keihin	8 November 1978	18 September 1979	29 January 1979	23 May 2002	Kure
MSC-652	Enoshima	Nippon Kokan, Keihin	4 October 1979	26 July 1980	25 December 1980	6 December 1996	Yokosuka
MSC-653	Ukishima	Hitachi Zosen Corporation, Kanagawa	15 May 1979	11 July 1980	27 November 1980	12 March 1997	Yokosuka
MSC-654	Oshima	Hitachi Zosen Corporation, Kanagawa	2 June 1980	17 June 1981	26 November 1981	23 March 1998	Ominato
MSC-655	Niijima	Nippon Kokan, Keihin	4 August 1980	2 June 1981	26 November 1981	4 March 2002	Ominato
MSC-656	Yakushima	Nippon Kokan, Keihin	15 June 1981	22 June 1982	17 December 1982	16 February 1999	Sasebo
MSC-657	Narushima	Hitachi Zosen Corporation, Kanagawa	29 May 1981	7 June 1982	17 December 1982	25 June 1999	Sasebo
MSC-658	Chichijima	Hitachi Zosen Corporation, Kanagawa	2 June 1982	13 July 1983	16 December 1983	13 March 2000	Yokosuka
MSC-659	Torishima	Nippon Kokan, Keihin	30 June 1982	23 June 1983	16 December 1983	1 December 2000	Yokosuka
MSC-660	Hahajima	Nippon Kokan, Keihin	20 May 1983	27 June 1984	18 December 1984	8 February 2000	Yokosuka
MSC-661	Takashima	Hitachi Zosen Corporation, Kanagawa	7 June 1983	18 June 1984	18 December 1984	4 June 2001	Kure
MSC-662	Nuwajima	Hitachi Zosen Corporation, Kanagawa	21 May 1984	5 June 1985	12 December 1985	29 May 2002	Kure
MSC-663	Etajima	Nippon Kokan, Keihin	22 May 1984	17 June 1985	12 December 1985	29 May 2002	Kure
MSC-664	Kamishima	Nippon Kokan, Keihin	10 May 1985	20 June 1986	16 December 1986	16 December 2004	Yokosuka
MSC-665	Himejima	Hitachi Zosen Corporation, Kanagawa	16 May 1985	10 June 1986	16 December 1986	16 December 2004	Yokosuka
MSC-666	Ogishima	Hitachi Zosen Corporation, Kanagawa	16 May 1985	10 June 1986	19 December 1986	26 February 2010	Kure
MSC-667	Moroshima	Nippon Kokan, Keihin	22 May 1986	10 June 1986	19 December 1986	9 February 2005	Kure
MSC-668	Yurishima	Nippon Kokan, Keihin	14 May 1987	13 May 1988	15 December 1988	23 February 2007	Kure
MSC-669	Hikoshima	Hitachi Zosen Corporation, Kanagawa	12 May 1987	2 June 1988	15 December 1988	11 March 2008	Kure
MSC-670	Awashima	Hitachi Zosen Corporation, Kanagawa	12 May 1988	6 June 1989	13 December 1989	6 March 2009	Yokosuka
MSC-671	Sakushima	Nippon Kokan, Keihin	17 May 1988	2 June 1989	13 December 1989	21 March 2013	Yokosuka
