= Sasha-class minesweeper =

Soviet class of minesweepers

Class overview
- Name: Sasha class (Project 265)
- Operators: Soviet Navy
- Succeeded by: Vanya class
- Built: 1954–1960
- In commission: 1954–1992?
- Completed: 37
- Lost: 1
- Retired: 36

General characteristics
- Type: Minesweeper
- Displacement: 245 tons standard, 269 tons full load
- Length: 45.1 m (148 ft 0 in)
- Beam: 6.2 m (20 ft 4 in)
- Draught: 1.8 m (5 ft 11 in)
- Propulsion: 2 shaft diesel engines 2,200 hp (1,600 kW)
- Speed: 19 knots (35 km/h; 22 mph)
- Range: 2,100 nautical miles (3,900 km; 2,400 mi) at 10 knots (19 km/h; 12 mph)
- Complement: 25
- Sensors & processing systems: Radar: Ball End; Sonar: Tamir-11
- Armament: 1 × 45 mm (1.8 in) or 57 mm (2.2 in) gun; 2 × twin 25 mm (0.98 in) guns; 12 mines; Sweeps MT-1, SEMT (magnetic), AT2 (acoustic)

The Sasha class is the NATO reporting name for a class of minesweepers built for the Soviet Navy between 1954 and 1956. The Soviet designation was Project 265.

== Design ==
The specification for the design was issued in 1946. The ships were steel-hulled coastal minesweepers and were to replace wartime T301-class coastal sweepers. Following trials the bow shape was changed to improve sea-keeping and more advanced electronics and sweeps were introduced throughout the service lives of these ships.

== Ships ==
At total of 37 ships were built at Rybinsk. The last two ships were retired in 1992.

== See also ==
- List of ships of the Soviet Navy
- List of ships of Russia by project number

Equivalent minesweepers of the same era

- Ham class
- Van Straelen class
- Atada class
