= Wildervank-class minesweeper =

Ship class of minehunters

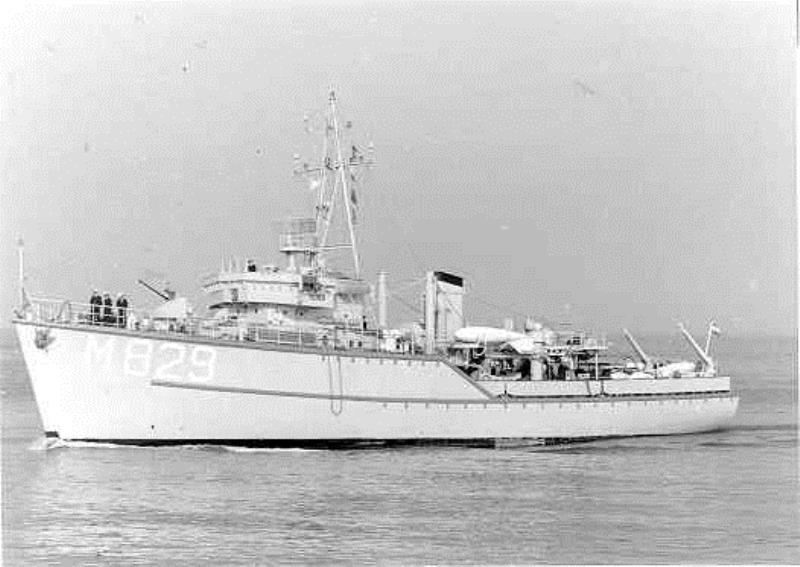
- Elst

Class overview
- Name: Wildervank class
- Builders: E. J. Smit & Zn., Westerbroek; G. de Vries Lentsch Jr., Amsterdam; De Groot & Van Vliet, Slikkerveer; De Haan & Oerlemans, Heusden; Haarlemse Scheepsbouw Maatschappij, Haarlem; Gebr. Pot, Bolnes; Verschure & Co's, Amsterdam
- Operators: Royal Netherlands Navy; Ethiopian Navy; Royal Navy of Oman
- Succeeded by: Alkmaar class
- Built: 1953–1957
- In commission: 1955–1993
- Planned: 14
- Completed: 14

General characteristics
- Type: Minesweeper
- Displacement: 417 tons
- Length: 46.62 m (152 ft 11 in)
- Beam: 8.75 m (28 ft 8 in)
- Draft: 2.28 m (7 ft 6 in)
- Propulsion: 2 × 1,250 hp (930 kW) Werkspoor diesel engines
- Speed: 14 knots (26 km/h; 16 mph)
- Crew: 38
- Armament: 2 × 40 mm Bofors guns; 1 × 20 mm machine gun

The Wildervank class was a ship class of fourteen minesweepers that were built in the Netherlands for the Royal Netherlands Navy. The minesweepers were almost identical to the Dokkum class built under the Mutual Defense Assistance Program (MDAP), but unlike the Dokkum class were paid for by the Dutch government. The diesel engines were also different.

== Ships in class ==
Hull number	Name	Builder	Laid down	Launched	Commissioned	Decommissioned	Fate	Notes
M803	Wildervank	G. de Vries Lentsch Jr.	10 November 1953	24 February 1955	28 December 1955	22 March 1973	Sold for scrap to A.J. Timmermans in 1977	
M804	Steenwijk	Haarlemse Scheepsbouw Maatschappij	26 August 1953	20 April 1956	16 July 1956	2 July 1969	Sold for scrap to F. Rijsdijk in 1969	
M805	Gieten	De Haan & Oerlemans	9 September 1953	17 February 1955	10 February 1956	2 July 1969	Sold for scrap to F. Rijsdijk in 1969	
M807	Waalwijk ¹	Verschure & Co's	21 October 1954	6 April 1955	21 June 1956	29 January 1968	Sold for scrap to A.J. Timmermans in 1977	
M808	Axel	De Groot & Van Vliet	17 October 1953	5 March 1955	16 March 1956	22 March 1973	Sold to the Omani Navy, renamed Al Salini	
M811	Aalsmeer	Gebr. Pot	25 November 1953	22 April 1955	3 May 1956	22 March 1973	Sold to the Omani Navy, renamed Al Nasiri	
M814	Meppel	Haarlemse Scheepsbouw Maatschappij	5 January 1954	19 July 1956	28 November 1956	22 March 1973	Sold for scrap to A.J. Timmermans in 1977	
M816	Lochem	E. J. Smit & Zn.	1 February 1954	22 October 1955	12 July 1956	2 July 1969	Sold for scrap to F. Rijsdijk in 1969	
M819	Goes	G. de Vries Lentsch Jr.	24 February 1955	23 March 1956	9 November 1956	22 March 1973	Sold for scrap to A.J. Timmermans in 1977	
M822	Leersum ¹	De Haan & Oerlemans	12 February 1955	11 August 1956	8 March 1957	8 February 1966	Sold for scrap to A.J. Timmermans in 1977	
M824	Sneek	Verschure & Co's	6 April 1955	28 June 1956	1 March 1957	2 July 1969	Sold for scrap to F. Rijsdijk in 1969	
M826	Grijpskerk	De Groot & Van Vliet	5 March 1955	10 March 1956	16 November 1956	15 September 1993	Sold for scrap to R. Zorn in 1993	
M829	Elst	Gebr. Pot	10 May 1955	21 March 1956	6 December 1956	2 November 1970	Sold to the Ethiopian Navy, renamed MS41	
M843	Lisse ¹	E. J. Smit & Zn.	10 March 1955	17 May 1956	22 February 1957	2 July 1969	Sold for scrap to F. Rijsdijk in 1969	

- ¹ = later rebuild as diving support vessel
