= Takami-class minesweeper =

Coastal minesweepers of JMSDF

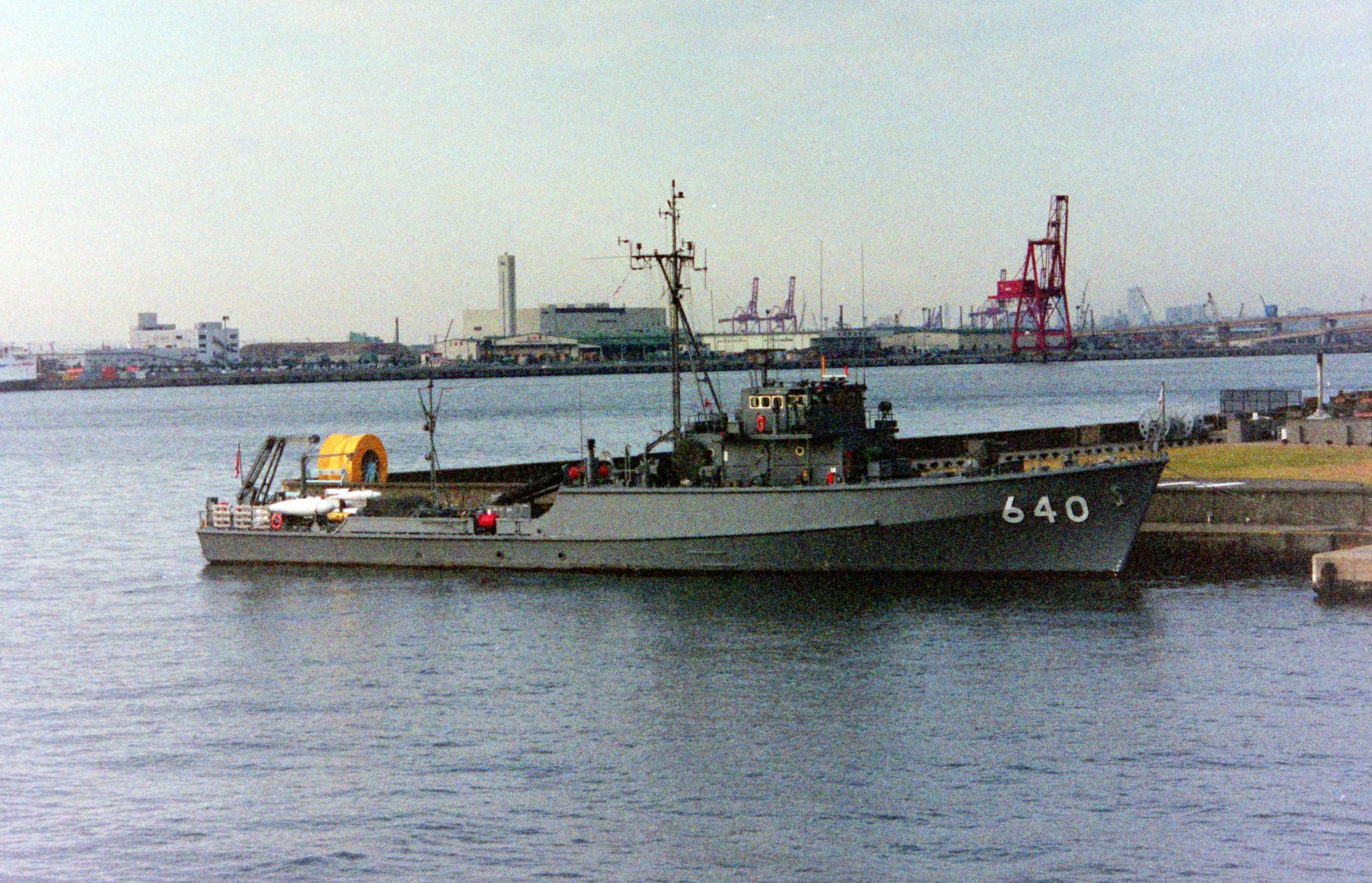
- JDS Takane

Class overview
- Name: Takami
- Builders: NKK, Keihin; Hitachi, Kanagawa
- Preceded by: Kasado class
- Succeeded by: Hatsushima class
- Built: 1968-1977
- In commission: 1969-2000
- Planned: 19
- Completed: 19
- Retired: 19

General characteristics
- Type: Minesweeper
- Displacement: 380 t (370 long tons) standard; 425 t (418 long tons) full load
- Length: 52 m (170 ft 7 in)
- Beam: 8.8 m (28 ft 10 in)
- Draft: 2.4 m (7 ft 10 in)
- Depth: 4.0 m (13 ft 1 in)
- Propulsion: 2 × Mitsubishi 12ZC 15/20 diesel electric engines; 2 × shafts
- Speed: 14 kn (26 km/h; 16 mph)
- Complement: 45
- Sensors & processing systems: OPS-9 surface-search radar; ZQS-2 sonar; Oropesa
- Armament: 1 × single Oerlikon 20mm gun

The Takami class is a class of coastal minesweepers of the Japan Maritime Self-Defense Force.

== Development ==
The experience of minesweeping during the Korean War has made countries concerned and aware of the threat of submerged mines. In particular, the increasing intelligence of sensitive mine ignition devices and the emergence of target tracking mines will increase the risk of touching mines and the uncertainty of minesweeping in conventional towed rear minesweeping, and one mine will be removed by explosive disposal methods. Attention was focused on minesweeping, which was to ensure that one was incapacitated.

However, on the other hand, as of the early 1950s, only the earliest mine detectors such as the American AN/UQS-1 were in practical use, and these 100 kHz class sonars were to detect mine-like targets. However, it was not practical to use for mine clearance because it was not possible to distinguish whether it was actually a mine. To solve this problem, the United Kingdom, Plessey Company, in addition to the 100 kilohertz for mine detection was a two-frequency sonar that corresponds to the 300 kilohertz for mine classification ASDIC 193 type developed, the 1960s the country's Navy's Ton-class minesweeper. It was since used It in by mounting it on a minesweeper.

In Japan's Maritime Self-Defense Force, after establishing the minimum required minesweeping operational force in the 1st Defense Build-up Plan and the 2nd Defense Build-up Plan, the amount of further minesweeping capacity in the 3rd Defense Build-up Plan The aim was to improve the quality and quality. For this reason, it was decided to give the new minesweeper, which will be maintained from the 1967 plan, the same minesweeper function as the Ton-class minesweeper.

== Ships in the class ==
Pennant no.	Name	Builders	Laid down	Launched	Commissioned	Decommissioned	Home port
MSC-630	Takami	Hitachi Zosen Corporation, Kanagawa	25 September 1968	15 July 1969	15 December 1969	12 March 1992	Kure
MSC-631	Iou	Nippon Kokan, Keihin	21 September 1968	12 August 1969	22 January 1970	24 November 1992	Kure
MSC-632	Miyake	Nippon Kokan, Keihin	14 August 1969	3 June 1970	19 November 1970	9 November 1992	Yokosuka
MSC-633	Utone	Hitachi Zosen Corporation, Kanagawa	6 August 1969	6 April 1970	30 September 1970	9 February 1993	Yokosuka
MSC-634	Awaji	Hitachi Zosen Corporation, Kanagawa	20 April 1970	11 December 1970	29 March 1971	25 March 1993	Kure
MSC-635	Toshi	Nippon Kokan, Keihin	14 May 1970	12 December 1970	18 March 1971	9 February 1993	Yokosuka
MSC-636	Teuri	Nippon Kokan, Keihin	12 April 1971	19 October 1971	14 March 1972	10 March 1995	Yokosuka
MSC-637	Murotsu	Hitachi Zosen Corporation, Kanagawa	16 April 1971	16 December 1971	30 March 1972	30 March 1995	Yokosuka
MSC-638	Tashiro	Hitachi Zosen Corporation, Kanagawa	26 May 1972	2 April 1973	30 July 1973	1 March 1996	Yokosuka
MSC-639	Miyato	Nippon Kokan, Keihin	22 April 1972	3 April 1973	24 August 1973	1 March 1996	Yokosuka
MSC-640	Takane	Nippon Kokan, Keihin	26 April 1973	8 March 1974	28 August 1974	21 February 1997	Kure
MSC-641	Muzuki	Hitachi Zosen Corporation, Kanagawa	7 June 1973	5 April 1974	28 August 1974	25 February 1997	Kure
MSC-642	Yokose	Hitachi Zosen Corporation, Kanagawa	2 July 1974	21 July 1975	15 December 1975	18 May 1998	Yokosuka
MSC-643	Sakate	Nippon Kokan, Keihin	6 August 1974	5 August 1975	15 December 1975	13 May 1999	Yokosuka
MSC-644	Oumi	Nippon Kokan, Keihin	20 June 1975	28 May 1976	18 November 1976	5 March 1999	Ominato
MSC-645	Fukue	Hitachi Zosen Corporation, Kanagawa	24 June 1975	12 July 1976	18 November 1976	13 May 1999	Ominato
MSC-646	Okitsu	Hitachi Zosen Corporation, Kanagawa	26 April 1976	4 March 1977	20 September 1977	31 March 2000	Kure
MSC-647	Hashira	Nippon Kokan, Keihin	22 February 1977	8 November 1977	28 March 1978	31 March 1997	Kure
MSC-648	Iwai	Hitachi Zosen Corporation, Kanagawa	20 July 1976	24 November 1977	28 March 1978	31 March 1997	Kure
