= Democrația-class minesweeper =

Class overview
- Name: Democrația class minesweeper
- Builders: Galați shipyard, Romania
- Operators: Romanian Naval Forces
- Planned: 4
- Completed: 4
- Retired: 4

History
- Laid down: 1943
- Launched: 1943
- Commissioned: 1953-1955
- Decommissioned: 1993
- Fate: Scrapped, 2001

General characteristics
- Type: Minesweeper
- Displacement: 543 tons standard; 775 tons full
- Length: 62.3 meters
- Beam: 8.5 meters
- Draught: 2.3 meters
- Propulsion: 2 boilers, 2 diesel engines (after 1975), 2 shafts;
- Speed: 17.2 knots
- Range: 4,000 nautical miles at 10 knots
- Complement: 75
- Armament: Upon launching (1943): 2 x 88 mm SK C/35 naval guns, later 2 x 90-K; Upon modernization (1976): 2 x 37 mm V-11; 1 x 37 mm 70-K; 2 x MR2N 14.5 mm machine guns; 50 mines

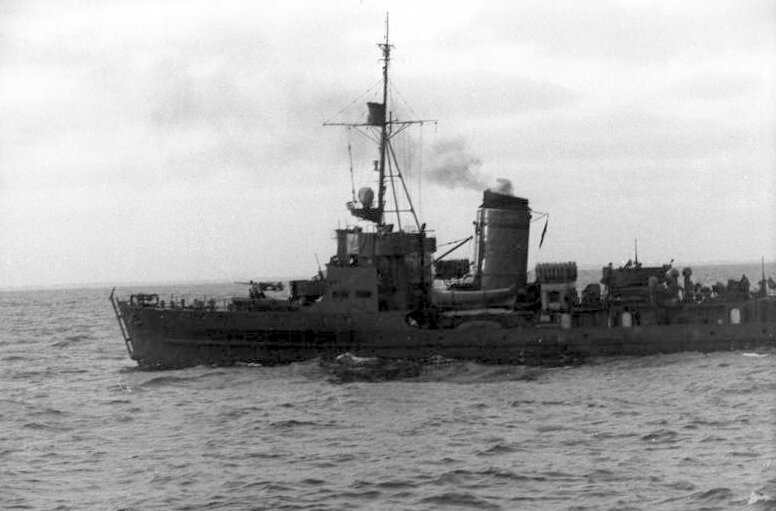
Similar German M1940 minesweeper

The Democrația-class minesweepers were a class of four minesweepers of the Romanian Navy, based on the design of the German M40 minesweeper but with different armament. They were built at the Galați shipyard and launched in 1943, being armed with two German 88 mm naval guns. Work on them was disrupted by the Soviet invasion of Romania in late 1944 and was only resumed in 1949. Two of the ships, renamed Democrația and Descătușarea, were completed in 1954, with Desrobirea completed in 1955 and Dreptatea in 1956. By 1960, the two German naval guns were replaced by Soviet 85 mm naval guns. The four ships were modernized in 1976, being mounted six AA guns of 37 mm and four machine guns of 14.5 mm, as well as mine launching rails, the ships being able to carry up to 50 mines each. In 1993, the ships were re-designated as corvettes and renamed Vice-Amiral Mihai Gavrilescu, Vice-Amiral Ioan Bălănescu, Vice-Amiral Emil Grescescu and Vice-Amiral Ioan Georgescu. Ultimately, the ships were scrapped in 2001.

== See also ==
Equivalent minesweepers of the same era

- Dokkum class
- Agile class
- Ton class
- Kasado class
- Vanya class
