= Van Straelen-class minesweeper =

Dutch Navy ship class (1960-1983)

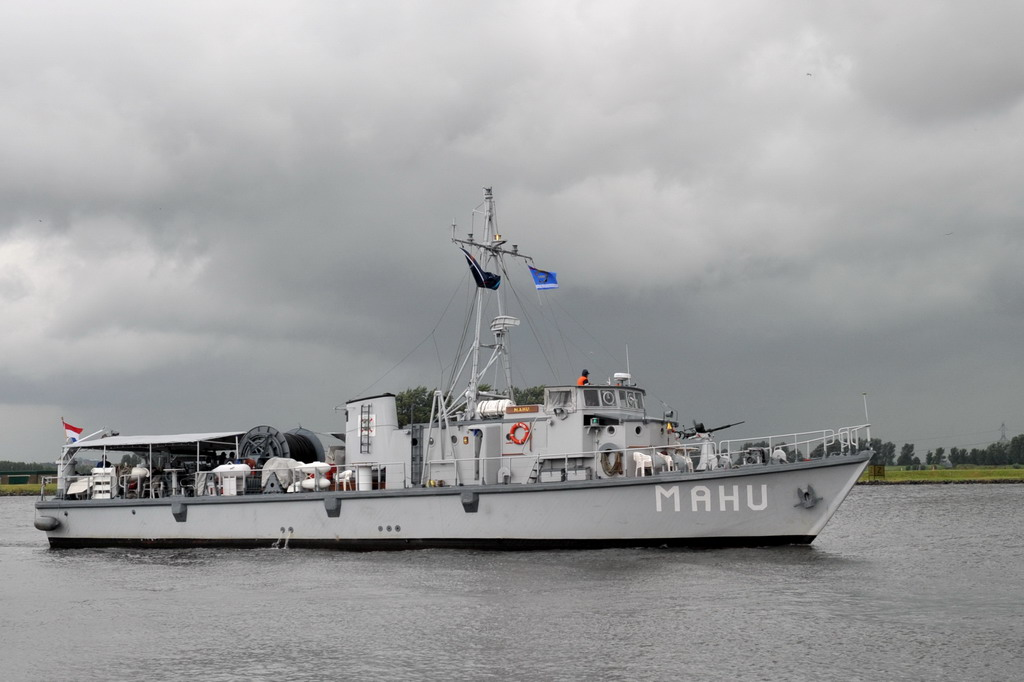
- Mahu

Class overview
- Name: Van Straelen class
- Builders: G. de Vries Lentschr Jr., Amsterdam; De Noord, Alblasserdam; Arnhemse Scheepsbouw Maatschappij, Arnhem
- Operators: Royal Netherlands Navy
- Cost: ƒ64 million (total cost)
- Built: 1958-1962
- Planned: 16
- Completed: 16

General characteristics
- Type: Minesweeper
- Displacement: 171.3 t (168.6 long tons)
- Length: 33.08 m (108 ft 6 in)
- Beam: 6.87 m (22 ft 6 in)
- Draft: 1.80 m (5 ft 11 in)
- Propulsion: 2 propellers; 1,100 hp (820 kW); Werkspoor diesel engines
- Speed: 13 knots (24 km/h; 15 mph)
- Crew: 14
- Armament: 1 x 20 mm machine gun

The Van Straelen class was a ship class of sixteen minesweepers (Note: Internationally also known as mine sweeper inshore (MSI).) that were built in the Netherlands for the Royal Netherlands Navy (RNLN). They were taken into service of the RNLN between 1960 and 1962 and served until 1 March 1983.

== Design and construction ==
The ships were designed in the Netherlands and build between 1958 and 1962 at several different Dutch shipyards. The costs of the class was split between the United States and the Netherlands. The United states paid under the Mutual Defense Assistance Program (MDAP) for the construction of eight ships and the Netherlands paid for the other eight ships.

To sweep mines the ships were equipped with the W Mk 7, ME 31 to ME 33 and the AX Mk 6B or 4V. Furthermore, they could be equipped with the M Mk 6h which would give the ships a magnetic sweeping ability.

== Service history ==
The minesweepers were used to sweep mines in shallow and narrow inland waters.

== Ships in class ==
The ships were named after officers, sailors and other personnel of the Royal Netherlands Navy that distinguished themselves during the Second World War and/or the Indonesian War of Independence and were awarded posthumously either the Military Order of William or Bronze Cross for their service.

Van Straelen-class construction data
Ship	Pennant No.	Builder	Laid down	Launched	Commissioned	Decommissioned	Fate
Alblas	M868	De Noord	26 January 1958	29 June 1959	12 March 1960	1983	Sold in 1986 to the firm Holland & Zn.
Bussemaker	M869	G. de Vries Lentschr Jr.	28 August 1958	27 February 1960	19 August 1960	1983	Sold in 1986 to Delft Geophysical
Lacomblé	M870	Arnhemse Scheepsbouw Maatschappij	27 April 1959	6 February 1960	22 August 1960	1983	Loaned to ZKK Den Helder in 1984. In 2022 loaned to Korps Zeekadetten in Veere.
Van Hamel	M871	G. de Vries Lentschr Jr.	27 April 1959	28 May 1960	14 November 1960	1983	Sold to Peru in 1984 as Acarillo
Van Straelen	M872	Arnhemse Scheepsbouw Maatschappij	28 November 1958	17 May 1960	20 December 1960	1983	Sold in 1986 to Delft Geophysical as Delft Fortuna
Van Moppes	M873	De Noord	6 April 1959	10 May 1960	19 December 1960	1983	Loaned to ZKK Hellevoetsluis in 1985
Chömpff	M874	De Noord	29 June 1959	10 May 1960	19 December 1960	1983	Sold in 1988 in Zaandam
Van Well Groeneveld	M875	Arnhemse Scheepsbouw Maatschappij	29 December 1959	1 October 1960	28 April 1961	1983	Sold in 1986 to Delft Geophysical as Delft Minerva
Schuiling	M876	G. de Vries Lentschr Jr.	26 June 1959	30 June 1960	5 April 1961	1983	Loaned to ZKK Maassluis in 1986
Van Versendaal	M877	De Noord	27 March 1961	4 December 1961	11 April 1962	1983	In 1984 to Zeekadetkorps
Van der Wel	M878	G. de Vries Lentschr Jr.	30 May 1960	3 May1961	6 October 1961	1983	Sold to Peru in 1984 as Melo
Van 't Hoff	M879	De Noord	8 June 1960	15 March 1961	6 October 1961	1983	Sold in 1986 to Delft Geophysical
Mahu	M880	De Noord	18 June 1960	15 March 1961	6 October 1961	1983	
Staverman	M881	G. de Vries Lentschr Jr.	8 July 1960	30 August 1961	21 February 1962	1983	Sold in 1986 to the firm Holland & Zn.
Houtepen	M882	Arnhemse Scheepsbouw Maatschappij	19 September 1960	26 August 1961	21 March 1962	1983	Sold in 1986 to Delft Geophysical
Zomer	M883	Arnhemse Scheepsbouw Maatschappij	16 May 1960	4 March 1961	6 October 1961	1983	Sold for scrap in 1987 to the firm Westmetaal

== See also ==
- List of minesweepers of the Royal Netherlands Navy

Equivalent minesweepers of the same era

- Ham class
- Atada class
- Sasha class
