= Dokkum-class minesweeper =

Ship class of minehunters

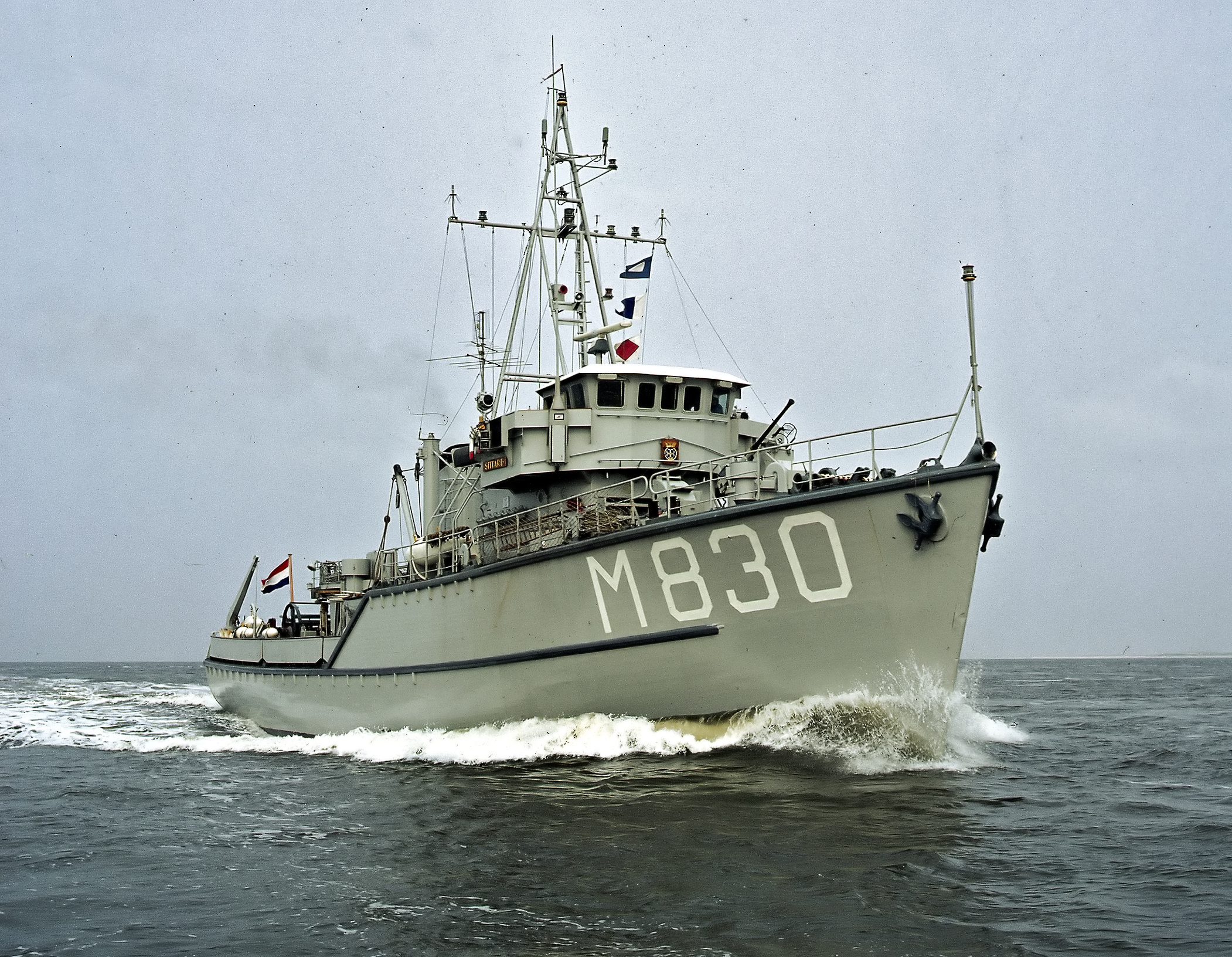
- Sittard

Class overview
- Name: Dokkum class
- Builders: Arnhemse Scheepsbouw Maatschappij, Arnhem; De Noord, Alblasserdam; Gusto Shipyard, Schiedam; Haarlemse Scheepsbouw Maatschappij, Haarlem; J. & K. Smit, Kinderdijk; L. Smit en Zoon, Kinderdijk; Niestern Scheepsbouw Unie, Hellevoetsluis; Wilton-Fijenoord, Schiedam
- Operators: Royal Netherlands Navy; Peruvian Navy
- Succeeded by: Alkmaar class
- Subclasses: Wildervank
- Built: 1953–1957
- In commission: 1955–1999
- Planned: 18
- Completed: 18
- Active: 1
- Preserved: 5

General characteristics
- Type: Minesweeper
- Displacement: 417 t (410 long tons)
- Length: 46.62 m (152 ft 11 in)
- Beam: 8.75 m (28 ft 8 in)
- Draft: 2.28 m (7 ft 6 in)
- Propulsion: 2 propellers; 2,500 hp (1,900 kW); MAN diesel engines
- Speed: 14 knots (26 km/h; 16 mph)
- Crew: 38
- Armament: 2 x 40mm guns; 1 x 20 mm machine gun (later added)

The Dokkum class was a ship class of eighteen minesweepers that were built in the Netherlands for the Royal Netherlands Navy (RNLN). They were paid for by the United States under the Mutual Defense Assistance Program (MDAP). The ships of the Dokkum class were the last dedicated minesweepers that served in the RNLN.

== Design ==
The minesweepers of the Dokkum class were designed by the Dutch engineer Scheltema de Heere and based on the standard requirements laid down by the Western Union (WU), later known as Western European Union (WEU). Since the minesweepers of both the Dokkum and Wildervank class are based on WU requirements, they are sometimes referred to in Dutch as WU-class minesweepers or minesweepers of the Western Union type.

The ships of the Dokkum class were made mostly from wood, only the frame and superstructure was made from aluminium. It also had a double hull, with the inner hull made out of mahogany and the outer hull of teak. Furthermore, they were equipped with reversible propellers.

While the minesweepers of the Dokkum and Wildervank class are almost identical, they do differ when it comes to the engines. The Dokkum class was equipped with two MAN diesel engines and the Wildervank class with two Werkspoor engines. As a result the minesweepers of the Dokkum class were more durable than those of the Wildervank class.

When it came to sweeping mines the ships of the Dokkum class were equipped with several different sweepers. As mechanic sweeper it had the Wire Mk 3 mod 2, the magnetic sweeper consisted of the ML Mk 4 and later the Mb 5, and the acoustic sweepers consisted of the AX Mk 4v, AXx Mk 6B and AX Mk 3. Furthermore, the ships were equipped with two 40 mm guns.

=== Conversion to minehunter ===
To keep in line with NATO requirements it was decided in 1962 to rebuild four Dokkum-class minesweepers (Dokkum, Drunen, Staphorst and Veere) into minehunters. During the rebuilding the ships were equipped with a Plessey 193 minehunting system, the bridge was modified to better suit mine hunting operations, an automatic track and trace system and autopilot were installed and several other modifications were implemented. The four minehunters of the Dokkum class entered service of the Royal Netherlands Navy between 1968 and 1969.

== Ships in class ==
The ships were named after the smaller Dutch municipalities.

Dokkum-class construction data
Hull number	Name	Builder	Laid down	Launched	Commissioned	Decommissioned	Fate	Notes
M801	Dokkum ¹	Wilton-Fijenoord	15 June 1953	12 October 1954	26 July 1955	15 April 1983		
M802	Hoogezand	Gusto Shipyard	17 July 1953	22 March 1955	7 November 1955	15 September 1993	Sold for scrap to R. Zorn	
M806	Roermond ²	Wilton-Fijenoord	19 September 1953	13 August 1955	29 December 1955	16 April 1987	In use by Zeekadetkorps Lemmer	
M809	Naaldwijk	De Noord Shipyard	2 November 1953	1 February 1955	8 December 1955	28 January 1994	In use by scouting Haarlem	
M810	Abcoude	Gusto Shipyard	10 November 1953	2 September 1955	18 May 1956	5 November 1993	Sold to the Peruvian Navy, now named Zimic	
M812	Drachten	Niestern Scheepsbouw Unie	29 December 1953	24 March 1955	27 January 1956	3 September 1994		
M813	Ommen	J. & K. Smit	22 December 1953	5 April 1955	19 April 1956	23 July 1994		
M815	Giethoorn	L. Smit en Zoon	22 December 1953	30 March 1955	29 March 1956	15 September 1993	Sold for scrap to R. Zorn	
M817	Venlo	Arnhemse Scheepsbouw Maatschappij	10 February 1954	21 May 1955	26 April 1956	15 September 1993	Sold for scrap to R. Zorn	
M818	Drunen ¹	Gusto Shipyard	8 January 1955	24 March 1956	30 August 1956	19 April 1984	Sold for scrap to Fa. Westmetaal Amsterdam	
M820	Woerden ²	Haarlemse Scheepsbouw Maatschappij	10 August 1954	28 November 1956	24 April 1957	September 1985		
M823	Naarden	Wilton-Fijenoord	28 October 1954	27 January 1956	18 May 1956	1999	In use by Zeekadetkorps Delfzijl	
M827	Hoogeveen	De Noord Shipyard	1 February 1955	8 May 1956	2 November 1956	1999	Museum ship in Den Helder	
M828	Staphorst ¹	Gusto Shipyard	2 May 1955	21 July 1956	23 January 1957	20 January 1984	Sold for scrap to Fa. Westmetaal Amsterdam	
M830	Sittard	Niestern Scheepsbouw Unie	24 March 1955	26 April 1956	19 December 1956	1999	In use by Zeekadetkorps Harlingen	
M841	Gemert	J. & K. Smit	5 April 1995	13 March 1956	7 September 1956	15 September 1993	Sold for scrap to R. Zorn	
M842	Veere ¹	L. Smit en Zoon	30 March 1955	9 February 1956	27 September 1956	19 October 1984	Sold for scrap to Fa. Westmetaal Amsterdam	
M844	Rhenen ²	Arnhemse Scheepsbouw Maatschappij	18 April 1955	31 May 1956	7 December 1956	1 January 1984	Sold for scrap to Fa. Holland en Zn.	

- ¹ = later rebuilt as minehunter
- ² = later rebuilt as diving support vessel

== Export ==
In 1994 the Abcoude was sold for 450.000 Dutch guilders to Peru. In addition, the reserve parts of the ship were sold for 160.000 Dutch guilders.

== See also ==
- List of minesweepers of the Royal Netherlands Navy

Equivalent minesweepers of the same era

- Agile class
- Ton class
- Kasado class
- Vanya class
- Democrația class
