= Vanya-class minesweeper =

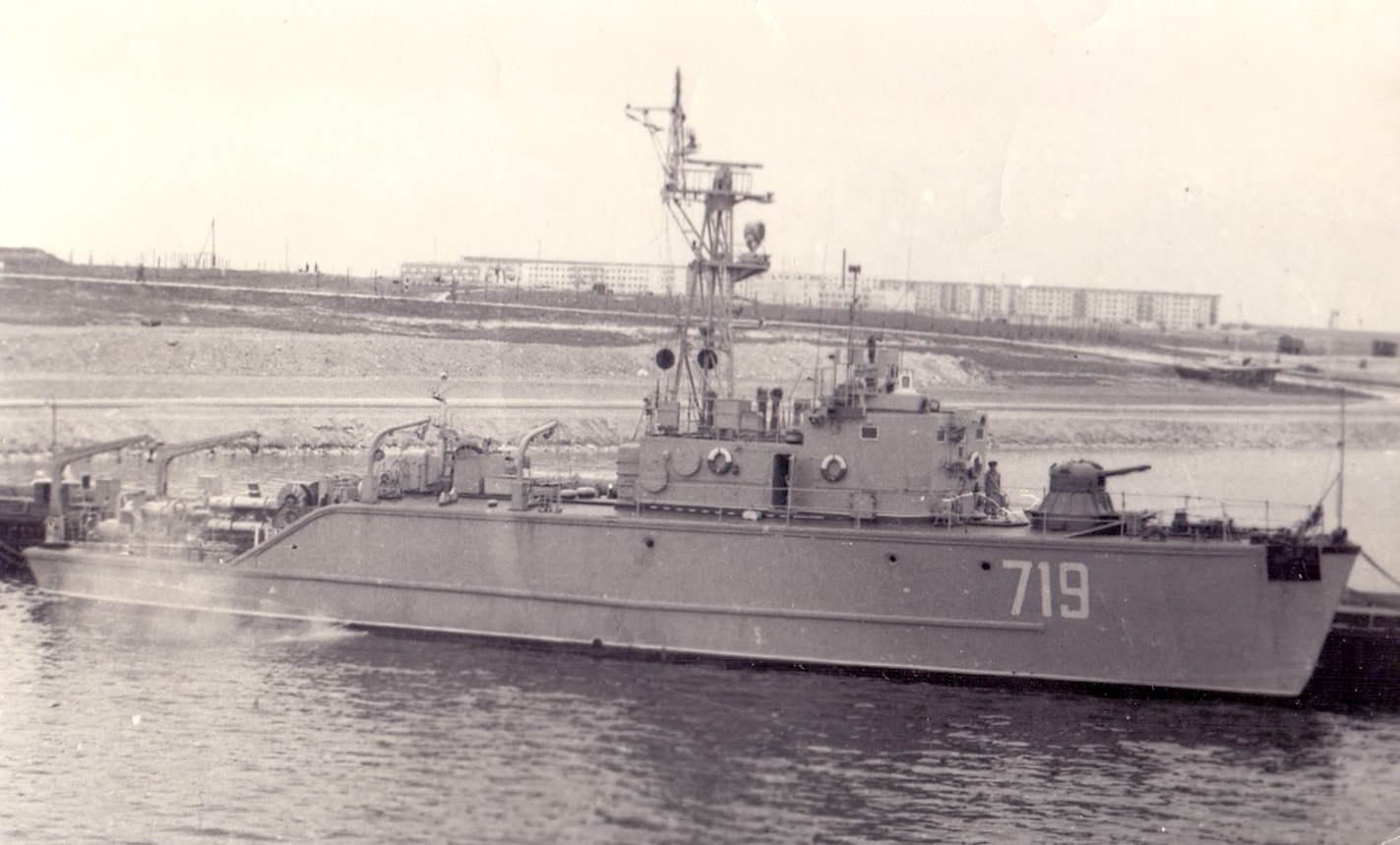
- Project 257DM "Vanya-class" minesweeper

Class overview
- Name: Project 257 minesweeper
- Operators: Soviet Navy; Bulgarian Navy; Syrian Navy
- Preceded by: Sasha class
- Succeeded by: Zhenya class
- Built: 1960–1973
- In commission: 1960–1990s
- Completed: 47
- Lost: 1

General characteristics
- Type: Minesweeper
- Displacement: 200 tons standard; 260 tons full load
- Length: 40.2 m (131 ft 11 in)
- Beam: 7.9 m (25 ft 11 in)
- Draught: 1.7 m (5 ft 7 in)
- Propulsion: 2 shafts; Diesel engines, 1,600 kW (2,200 hp)
- Speed: 16 knots (30 km/h; 18 mph)
- Range: 2,400 nmi (4,400 km; 2,800 mi) at 10 knots (19 km/h; 12 mph)
- Complement: 30
- Sensors & processing systems: Radar: Don 2 Sonar: MG-69 Lan mine-search, MG-25
- Armament: 2 × 30 mm (1.2 in) AK-230M guns; 8 naval mines; Sweeps MT-1, MTSh

The Vanya class were a series of minesweepers built for the Soviet Navy between 1960 and 1973. The Soviet designation was Project 257.

== Design ==
=== Project 257D ===
Two ships of different hull material were constructed as trial ships for a coastal minesweeper design for the Soviet Navy that required reduced detection signatures by various naval mine types. Hull one, dubbed Project 257D was made out of wood and hull two, dubbed 257M, was constructed of low-magnetic steel. The Soviet Navy selected the wooden hull version for mass production, which featured reduced signatures for magnetic, electric, acoustic and hydrodynamic mines compared to the Sasha class. By using dielectric coating and insulation, special sound dampening machinery and low-noise propellers that utilised air bubble shields to mask them, the signatures were reduced by a factor of 50 for magnetic, 8 to 10 for acoustic, 5 for electric and significant reduction for hydrodynamic mines.

Designated Basovyy Tral'shchik ("Base Minesweeper"), the ships of the initial design measured 40.2 metres (131 ft 11 in) long with a beam of 7.9 metres (25 ft 11 in) and a draught of 1.7 metres (5 ft 7 in). They had a standard displacement of 200 tonnes (200 long tons) and 260 tonnes (260 long tons) at full load. The minesweepers were powered by two M-870-FTK lightweight high-speed diesel engines turning two propellers creating 890 kilowatts (1,200 bhp). This gave them a maximum speed of 16 knots (30 km/h; 18 mph) and a maximum range of 2,400 nautical miles (4,400 km; 2,800 mi) at 10 knots (19 km/h; 12 mph).

These were the first minesweepers in the Soviet fleet to have hydraulic sweep equipment. They primarily mounted three types of sweeps: television hunting tow sweep, electromagnetic sweep, and contact sweep. Only one type of sweep could be used at a time. The ships were also armed a pair of twin-mounted AK-230M autocannon which had been de-magnetized and carried eight naval mines themselves. The gun was controlled by a remote Kolonka-1 ringsight director.

Project 257D construction data
Name	Builder	Commissioned	Fate
TM-2	Vladivostok Shipyard, No. 602	31 December 1964	Renamed BT-246 on 19 May 1966.
TM-4	Petrozavodsk Shipyard, No. 789	1961	
TM-5	Vladivostok Shipyard, No. 602	31 December 1964	Renamed BT-247 on 19 May 1966.
TM-8	Petrozavodsk Shipyard, No. 789	1963	Renamed BT-178 on 19 May 1966.
TM-10	Primorskiy Shipyard No. 5, Leningrad	1964	
TM-13	Primorskiy Shipyard No. 5, Leningrad	1964	
TM-14	Vladivostok Shipyard, No. 602	1965	Renamed BT-442 on 19 May 1966.
TM-15	Primorskiy Shipyard No. 5, Leningrad	1963	
TM-18	Petrozavodsk Shipyard, No. 789	1962	
TM-21	Petrozavodsk Shipyard, No. 789	1962	Renamed BT-211 on 19 May 1966.
TM-22	Petrozavodsk Shipyard, No. 789	1963	Renamed BT-122 on 19 May 1966.
TM-24	Primorskiy Shipyard No. 5, Leningrad	1962	
TM-25	Petrozavodsk Shipyard, No. 789	1962	Renamed BT-117 on 19 May 1966.
TM-27	Primorskiy Shipyard No. 5, Leningrad	1963	
TM-29	Petrozavodsk Shipyard, No. 789	1963	
TM-31	Petrozavodsk Shipyard, No. 789	1963	Renamed BT-231 in 1966. Renamed SR-229 on 30 April 1989.
TM-35	Vladivostok Shipyard, No. 602	23 November 1964	Renamed BT-356 on 19 May 1966
TM-41	Primorskiy Shipyard No. 5, Leningrad	15 September 1965	Renamed BT-416 on 19 May 1966.
TM-45	Primorskiy Shipyard No. 5, Leningrad	1965	Renamed Komsomolets Kirgizii in 1965.
TM-45	Vladivostok Shipyard, No. 602	1965	Renamed BT-447 on 19 May 1966.

=== Project 257DM ===
As the design advanced, it was found that the powerplant could handing more sweeps and an improved design with the capability of combatting magnetic-acoustic fused mines was initiated. This upgraded design, designated Project 257DM was equipped with new sweeps: loop coil/acoustic, solenoid/acoustic, and contact/acoustic. They could also operate against rising mines, a new concept coming into service by using a contact sweep paired with an acoustic sweep. Due to the design's effectiveness, they were utilized as convoy escorts in coastal waters.

Project 257DM construction data
Name	Builder	Commissioned	Fate
BT-70	Avangard, Petrozavodsk	10 October 1965	
BT-83	Avangard, Petrozavodsk	1967	
BT-103	Vladivostok Shipyard	1972	
BT-124	Avangard, Petrozavodsk	1966	
BT-201	Vladivostok Shipyard	5 December 1968	
BT-251	Avangard, Petrozavodsk	1969	
BT-255	Avangard, Petrozavodsk	1967	
BT-259	Avangard, Petrozavodsk	1967	
BT-261	Avangard, Petrozavodsk	1967	
BT-268	Avangard, Petrozavodsk	1968	
BT-271	Avangard, Petrozavodsk	1969	
BT-273	Avangard, Petrozavodsk	1969	
BT-275	Avangard, Petrozavodsk	1970	
BT-277	Vladivostok Shipyard	30 June 1969	
BT-279	Vladivostok Shipyard	1969	
BT-282	Vladivostok Shipyard	1967	
BT-284	Vladivostok Shipyard	30 August 1968	
BT-305	Avangard, Petrozavodsk	30 August 1970	
BT-307	Avangard, Petrozavodsk	1970	
BT-312	Avangard, Petrozavodsk	1970	
BT-314	Vladivostok Shipyard	20 June 1970	
BT-316	Vladivostok Shipyard	30 September 1970	
BT-318	Avangard, Petrozavodsk	1971	
BT-329	Avangard, Petrozavodsk	1969	
BT-334	Avangard, Petrozavodsk	10 December 1968	
BT-335	Avangard, Petrozavodsk	1968	
BT-338	Vladivostok Shipyard	1971	
BT-449	Avangard, Petrozavodsk	1966	Renamed OS-575 in 1982.
BT-358	Vladivostok Shipyard	1971	
TM-1	Avangard, Petrozavodsk	1964	
TM-6	Avangard, Petrozavodsk	25 September 1964	
TM-9	Avangard, Petrozavodsk	1964	
TM-16	Avangard, Petrozavodsk	25 October 1964	
TM-33	Avangard, Petrozavodsk	1965	Renamed BT-33 on 19 May 1966.
TM-37	Avangard, Petrozavodsk	1965	Renamed BT-37 on 19 May 1966.
TM-39	Avangard, Petrozavodsk	1965	
TM-43	Avangard, Petrozavodsk	1966	
TM-85	Vladivostok Shipyard	30 April 1967	
TM-87	Vladivostok Shipyard	1966	
TM-93	Avangard, Petrozavodsk	1967	

=== Project 257DT ===
In 1974, one unit was modified and had its sweep gear removed. A small mast was installed amidships, and the guns were swapped out for twin-mounted 25-millimetre (0.98 in) versions. The vessel was equipped with two boats for mine disposal divers.

=== Project 699 ===
The design underwent one further evolution, replacing the diesel engines with more powerful ones, capable of creating 1,900 kilowatts (2,500 bhp). This made it possible to use heavier sweeps such as barge and bottom contact sweeps. Three vessels were modernised and dubbed Project 699B, designated "Vanya-II" by NATO, were one-metre (3 ft 3 in) longer with a larger diesel exhaust amidships. They had a smaller displacement, registering 195 tonnes (192 long tons) standard and 235 tonnes (231 long tons) at full load. They had a range of 1,450 nautical miles (2,690 km; 1,670 mi) at 14 knots (26 km/h; 16 mph), carried 12 mines and were armed with a 25-millimetre (0.98 in) naval gun.

Project 699 construction data
Name	Builder	Commissioned	Fate
BT-3	Avangard, Petrozavodsk	1965	Renamed BT-225 on 19 May 1966.
BT-101	Avangard, Petrozavodsk	1967	
BT-120	Avangard, Petrozavodsk	1966	Renamed BT-126 on 19 May 1966.
BT-192	Avangard, Petrozavodsk	1968	
BT-309	Avangard, Petrozavodsk	1967	

== Export ==
In total nine ships were exported to Bulgaria and Syria. All nine ships were of one design, Project 277DMF. Ships of the project were of similar construction as those of the other projects but had glass-reinforced plastic-sheathed hulls and measured 39.9 metres (130 ft 11 in) long, with a beam of 7.5 metres (24 ft 7 in) and a draught of 1.6 metres (5 ft 3 in). They had a standard displacement of 220 tonnes (220 long tons) and 260 tonnes (260 long tons) at full load. They were powered by two Type 98B diesel engines that created 1,600 kilowatts (2,200 bhp) that gave them a maximum speed of 14 knots (26 km/h; 16 mph) and maximum range of 2,400 nautical miles (4,400 km; 2,800 mi) at 10 knots (19 km/h; 12 mph). They were armed with two 30 mm (1.2 in)/65-calibre AK-230 naval guns placed in a single mount for anti-aircraft defence. They could also carry between eight and twelve naval mines. They had Don II navigational radar and a High Pole A identification friend or foe system and a crew of 30.

=== Bulgarian Navy ===
Seven ships were transferred to the Bulgarian Navy in three batches during the Cold War. The first two pairs, in 1970 and 1971 respectively, coincided with a renewal of Bulgaria's postwar fleet that was prefaced by three consecutive Five-Year Plans. The final ships were acquired in 1985 during another attempt at fleet renewal, however, the poor Bulgarian economy and the breakup of the Warsaw Pact in the late 1980s saw no further acquisitions.

Bulgarian Project 277DMF construction data
Hull number	Name	Builder	Commissioned	Fate
31	Iskar			
32	Zibor			
33	Dobrotich			
34	Kiril Mintov			Deleted 1992
35, 34	Ekstati Vinarov			
36	Kapitan 1 Rang Dimitri Paskadev			Deleted 1992

=== Syrian Navy ===
Syria had longstanding links with the Soviet Union during the Cold War and in December 1972, the two ships were transferred to the Syrian Navy.

Syrian Project 277DMF construction data
Hull number	Name	Builder	Commissioned	Fate
775	Kadisa			
776	Yarmuk			

== See also ==
- List of ships of the Soviet Navy
- List of ships of Russia by project number

=== Equivalent minesweepers of the same era ===
- Agile class
- Dokkum class
- Ton class
- Kasado class
- Democrația class
