= JDS Yashiro =

Minesweeper of the JMSDF

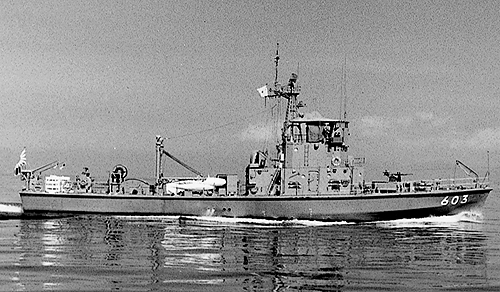
- JDS Yashiro

History

Japan
- Name: Yashiro; (やしろ)
- Namesake: Yashiro
- Ordered: 1953
- Builder: NKK, Keihin
- Laid down: 22 June 1955
- Launched: 26 March 1956
- Commissioned: 10 July 1956
- Decommissioned: 18 March 1981
- Reclassified: YAS-58
- Home port: Kure
- Identification: Pennant number: MSO-603
- Fate: Unknown

Class overview
- Preceded by: Atada class
- Succeeded by: Kasado class

General characteristics
- Type: Minesweeper
- Displacement: 225 t (221 long tons) standard; 235 t (231 long tons) full load
- Length: 37.5 m (123 ft 0 in)
- Beam: 7.75 m (25 ft 5 in)
- Draft: 1.93 m (6 ft 4 in)
- Depth: 3.7 m (12 ft 2 in)
- Propulsion: 2 × Mitsubishi YV10ZC15 / 201 diesel electric engines; 2 × shafts
- Speed: 13.5 kn (25.0 km/h; 15.5 mph)
- Complement: 33
- Sensors & processing systems: AN/SPS-10; UQS-1D sonar
- Armament: 1 × single Oerlikon 20mm gun

JDS Yashiro (MSC-603) was the only ship of its type of minesweeper of Japan Maritime Self-Defense Force (JMSDF).

== Construction and career ==
Yashiro was laid down on 22 June 1955 and launched on 26 March 1956 by Nippon Kokan Keihin Shipyard. She was commissioned on 10 July 1956 and on September 1, the same year, the 31st Mine Warfare Group was newly formed in Kure District Force, and she was incorporated with JDS Atada and JDS Itsuki.

On 16 March 1957, the 31st Mine Warfare Group was reorganized under the 1st Mine Warfare Force.

On 15 March 1969, the 31st Mine Warfare Group was reorganized into the Kure District Force.

On 2 March 1970, the 31st Mine Warfare Group was reorganized into the Hanshin Base Corps under the Kure District Force.

On 31 March 1972, she was changed to an auxiliary ship, her registration number was changed to YAS-58, and she was transferred to the Kure District Force.

She was decommissioned on March 18, 1981.
