= Atada-class minesweeper =

Coastal minesweepers of JMSDF

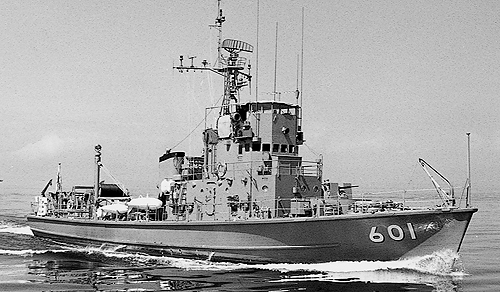
- JDS Atada

Class overview
- Name: Atada
- Builders: NKK, Keihin; Hitachi, Kanagawa
- Preceded by: Ujishima class
- Succeeded by: Yashiro class
- Built: 1955–1956
- In commission: 1956–1980
- Planned: 2
- Completed: 2
- Retired: 2

General characteristics
- Type: Minesweeper
- Displacement: 240 t (240 long tons) standard; 260 t (260 long tons) full load
- Length: 37.5 m (123 ft 0 in)
- Beam: 6.8 m (22 ft 4 in)
- Draft: 2.1 m (6 ft 11 in)
- Depth: 3.7 m (12 ft 2 in)
- Propulsion: 2 × diesel electric engines; 2 × shafts
- Speed: 14 knots (26 km/h; 16 mph)
- Complement: 33
- Sensors & processing systems: AN/SPS-10 surface-search radar; AN/UQS-1D sonar
- Armament: 1 × single Oerlikon 20 mm gun

The Atada class is a class of coastal minesweepers of the Japan Maritime Self-Defense Force.

== Development ==
During the Pacific War, a large number of mines were laid in the waters near Japan by both Japan and the United States, which greatly hindered shipping including coastal areas at the end of the war, so the need to deal with this was urgent. For this reason, the minesweeping force was maintained even while the Imperial Japanese Navy was dismantled after the surrender of Japan, and was taken over by the 2nd Ministry of Demobilization on 1 December 1945. After that, minesweepers were absorbed by the Japan Coast Guard, which was established on 1 August 1952, and transferred to the Coastal Security Force.

Immediately after its inauguration, the guards have been aiming for domestic production of minesweepers, and in 1953, the first year after their inauguration, the construction of three medium-sized minesweepers (MSCs) was included. These three vessels have the characteristics of actual ship experiments, and two systems will be adopted for both the ship type and the main engine. Of these, two vessels adopted the round hull type. On the other hand, it was JDS Yashiro that adopted the square hull form.

== Ships in the class ==
Pennant no.	Name	Builders	Laid down	Launched	Commissioned	Decommissioned	Home port
MSC-601	Atada	Hitachi Zosen Corporation, Kanagawa	20 June 1955	12 March 1956	30 April 1956	17 March 1950	Kure
MSC-602	Itsuki	Nippon Kokan, Keihin	22 June 1955	12 March 1956	30 June 1956	20 March 1978	Kure

== See also ==
Equivalent minesweepers of the same era

- Ham class
- Van Straelen class
- Sasha class
