= USS Olympic =

Patrol vessel of the United States Navy

History

United States
- Name: Olympic
- Owner: Frank Wright (1917)
- Builder: E. W. Heath, Seattle, Washington
- Completed: 1913
- Fate: Acquired by U.S. Navy 15 May 1917
- Notes: Civilian yacht

History

United States
- Name: USS Olympic
- Namesake: Previous name retained
- Operator: United States Navy
- Acquired: 15 May 1917
- Commissioned: 9 June 1917
- Fate: Transferred to U.S. Public Health Service 13 September 1919

United States
- Name: USPHS Bailhache
- Namesake: Preston H. Bailhache (1835–1919), U.S. Marine Hospital Service physician
- Operator: U.S. Public Health Service
- Acquired: 13 September 1919
- Fate: Sold 10 February 1934

United States
- Name: Moby Dick
- Namesake: A fictional white whale in the 1851 Herman Melville novel Moby-Dick
- Owner: H. W. McCurdy (1934); S. Catherine McCurdy (1941)
- Acquired: 10 February 1934
- Fate: Acquired by U.S. Army December 1941

United States
- Name: USAS Q-108
- Operator: United States Army
- Acquired: December 1941
- Out of service: 1945
- Fate: Returned to owner 1946

United States
- Name: Moby Dick
- Namesake: A fictional white whale in the 1851 Herman Melville novel Moby-Dick
- Owner: S. Catherine McCurdy (1946); Michael R. Uttecht (1949); Subsequently various owners
- Acquired: 1946
- Fate: Sank 24 May 1989; Refloated, stored, and scrapped

General characteristics (as U.S. Navy patrol vessel)
- Type: Patrol vessel
- Tonnage: 40 gross tons
- Displacement: 28.4 tons
- Length: 64 ft (20 m)
- Beam: 13 ft 6 in (4.11 m)
- Draft: 4 ft 3 in (1.30 m) mean
- Propulsion: One 55 hp (41 kW) 3-cylinder Standard gasoline engine, one shaft
- Speed: 9.4 knots
- Complement: 18
- Armament: 1 × 3-pounder gun; 2 × machine guns

General characteristics (as USPHS vessel, private yacht, cargo vessel, and passenger vessel)
- Tonnage: 40 gross tons (1920); 38 gross tons (1948)
- Length: 64.9 ft (19.8 m) (1920); 61.7 ft (18.8 m) (1948)
- Beam: 13 ft (4 m) (1920); 13.8 ft (4.2 m) (1948)
- Draft: 5.6 ft (1.7 m) (1920); 6.4 ft (2 m) (1920)
- Crew: 1 (1948); 8 (1950)

USS Olympic (SP-260) was a United States Navy patrol vessel in commission from 1917 to 1919. After her U.S. Navy career ended, she served in the United States Public Health Service as the boarding vessel USPHS Bailhache from 1919 to 1934. She then operated as the yacht, cargo vessel, and passenger vessel Moby Dick until 1989, except for a period of World War II United States Army service as USAS Q-108 from 1941 to 1946.

The Dictionary of American Naval Fighting Ships erroneously claims that the vessel served in the United States Coast and Geodetic Survey from 1919 to 1934 as a survey vessel named USC&GS Dailhache.

== Construction, acquisition, and commissioning ==
Olympic was built as a civilian yacht of the same name in 1913 by E. W. Heath at Seattle, Washington. The U.S. Navy acquired her from her owner, Frank Wright of Seattle, on 15 May 1917 for World War I service as a patrol vessel. She was commissioned on 9 June 1917 as USS Olympic (SP-260).

== Service history ==
=== U.S. Navy ===
Operating on section patrol duties in the 13th Naval District (headquartered at Port Townsend, Washington) during World War I, Olympic patrolled in and around Puget Sound.

=== U.S. Public Health Service ===
Olympic was transferred to the United States Public Health Service on 13 September 1919, and on 12 November 1919 was renamed USPHS Bailhache in honor of Preston H. Bailhache (1835–1919), a prominent physician of the United States Marine Hospital Service who had once served as a doctor for the family of Abraham Lincoln. Bailhache served with the Public Health Service at Seattle as a boarding vessel until sold to H. W. McCurdy on 10 February 1934.

=== Later career ===
After her sale, the vessel returned to service as a private yacht with the name Moby Dick. S. Catherine McCurdy of Port Townsend acquired Moby Dick in 1941.

The United States Army acquired Moby Dick for World War II service in December 1941 and renamed her USAS Q-108. She remained in U.S. Army service until the end of the war in 1945, and the Army returned her to her previous owner, S. Catherine McCurdy, in 1946. The vessel again was named Moby Dick.

In 1949, Michael R. Uttecht of King Cove, Territory of Alaska, acquired Moby Dick and placed her in service as a cargo vessel. Moby Dick subsequently had a number of owners in the Pacific Northwest and eventually was converted into a passenger vessel.

Moby Dick sank at her moorings on 24 May 1989. She was refloated and placed in storage at Everett, Washington. She eventually was scrapped.
