= Zhenya-class minesweeper =

Class overview
- Name: Zhenya class (Project 1252)
- Builders: Izhora
- Operators: Soviet Navy
- Preceded by: Vanya class
- Succeeded by: Sonya class
- In commission: 1966–1990s
- Completed: 3
- Lost: 1
- Retired: 2

General characteristics
- Type: Minesweeper
- Displacement: 220 t (220 long tons) (standard); 300 t (300 long tons) (full load)
- Length: 42.4 m (139 ft 1 in)
- Beam: 7.9 m (25 ft 11 in)
- Draught: 1.8 m (5 ft 11 in)
- Propulsion: 2 shafts; Diesel engines, 1,800 kW (2,400 bhp)
- Speed: 16 knots (30 km/h; 18 mph)
- Range: 2,400 nmi (4,400 km; 2,800 mi) at 10 knots (19 km/h; 12 mph)
- Complement: 40
- Sensors & processing systems: Radar: "Spin Trough", "Don I"; "Two Square Head" IFF
- Armament: 2 × 30 mm (1.2 in) guns; 6 naval mines

Project 1252 'Izumrud' (Изумруд - 'Emerald') (NATO reporting name: Zhenya class) were a group of three minesweepers built for the Soviet Navy in the late 1960s. The ships were a glass-reinforced plastic (GRP)-hulled version of the preceding wooden-hulled Vanya class. They were intended to be a prototype of an advanced design, instead the Soviet Navy returned to wooden-hulled minesweeper construction with the following Sonya class. Of the three minesweepers, one was lost in an explosion in 1989 and the fate of the other two is unknown.

== Description and design ==
The minesweepers of Project 1252 'Izumrud' (NATO reporting name: Zhenya class) were a GRP-hulled trial version based on the preceding wooden-hulled Vanya class. They had a standard displacement of 220 tonnes (220 long tons) and 300 tonnes (300 long tons) fully loaded. (Note: Polmar has the fully load displacement at 290 tonnes (290 long tons), while Sharpe has the full load displacement as 360 tonnes (350 long tons).) They measured 42.4 metres (139 ft 1 in) long with a beam of 7.9 metres (25 ft 11 in) and a draught of 1.8 metres (5 ft 11 in). The vessels were powered by two diesel engines each turning a propeller shaft creating 1,800 kW (2,400 bhp). The Zhenya class had a maximum speed of 16 knots (30 km/h; 18 mph) and range of 2,400 nautical miles (4,400 km; 2,800 mi) at 10 knots (19 km/h; 12 mph) and 1,400 nmi (2,600 km; 1,600 mi) at 14.5 knots (26.9 km/h; 16.7 mph).

The vessels were armed with twin-mounted 30-millimetre (1.2 in)/65 calibre guns. They also carried six naval mines. The Zhenya class was equipped with "Spin Through" and "Don I" surface search radar and "Two Square Head" identification friend or foe. They had a complement of 40.

== Construction and career ==
The design was accepted for construction in 1961 and three vessels were built by Izhora rated by the Soviet Navy as bazovy tralshchik (base minesweeper). The first vessel to complete in 1966, Komsomelets Turkmenii, was to be the prototype for an advanced coastal minesweeper design. Komsomolets Buryatii followed in 1968 and BT-177 in 1969. The design was not successful and the Soviet Navy chose to return to a wooden-hulled design in the Sonya class. Komsomelets Turkmenii was lost in an explosion on 19 August 1989. Komsomolets Buryatii was renamed BT-215 on 18 March 1992. The final fate of the remaining ships is unknown.

== See also ==
- List of ships of the Soviet Navy
- List of ships of Russia by project number
